= Galeazzi =

Galeazzi is a surname. Notable people with the surname include:

- Domenico Galeazzi (1647–1731), Italian painter
- Giampiero Galeazzi (1946-2021), Italian competition rower, sport journalist, commentator and television personality
- Lucia Galeazzi Galvani (1743–1788), Italian scientist
- Lucilla Galeazzi (born 1950), Italian folk singer
- Mara Galeazzi (born 1973), Italian ballet dancer
- Marcelo Galeazzi (1966–2016), Argentine footballer
- Ricardo Galeazzi (1866–1952), Italian orthopaedic surgeon
- Riccardo Galeazzi-Lisi (1891–1968), Italian medical doctor

== See also ==
- Galeazzi fracture, Bone fracture
- Galeazzi test, also known as the Allis sign, is used to assess for hip dislocation
