= Pietro Tabarrani =

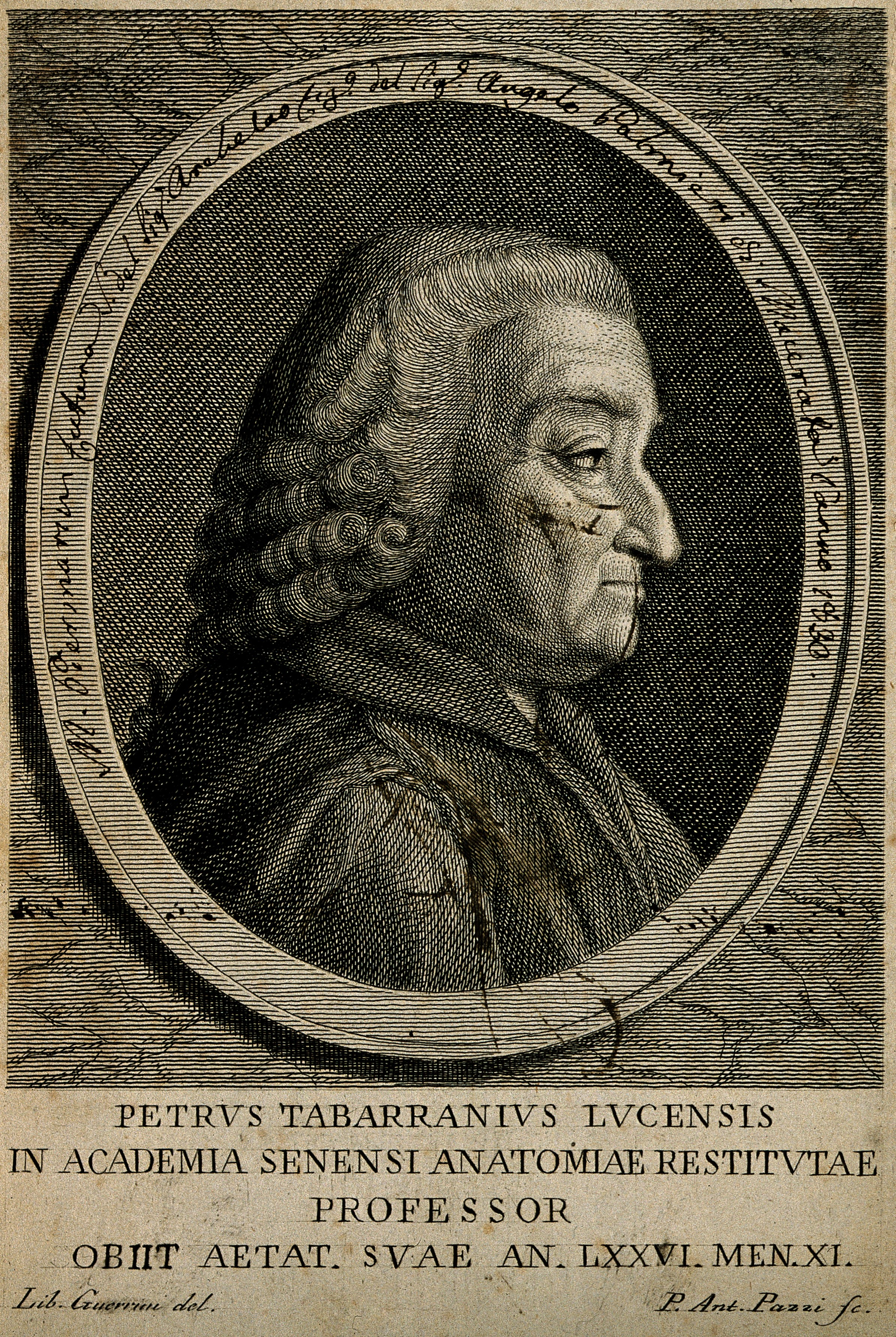
Pietro Tabarrani Portrait

Pietro Tabarrani (3 may 1702 – 5 April 1779) was an Italian physician and professor of Anatomy at the University of Siena.

== Biography ==
He was born in Lombrici (Camaiore) in the Republic of Lucca. He found patronage with Cardinal Salviati in Rome, where he studied anatomy. From there he moved to Bologna, where he became friends with the doctors Beccari and Galeazzi. He then moved to Padua to work under the renowned anatomist Morgagni. In 1759, he obtained a professorship in the University of Siena. He would die in Siena in 1779, and his pupil Paolo Mascagni would take his position. His Osservazioni anatomiche were published in Lucca in 1753.
