= Paolo Mascagni =

Italian physician and anatomist (1755–1815)

- Portrait of Paolo Mascagni. Engraving by Luigi Rados after Roberto Focosi
- Born: 25 January 1755; Pomarance, Italy
- Died: 19 October 1815 (aged 60); Chiusdino, Italy
- Occupation: Anatomist
- Known for: publishing the first complete description of the lymphatic system
- Parent(s): Aurelio Mascagni & Elizabeth Burroni

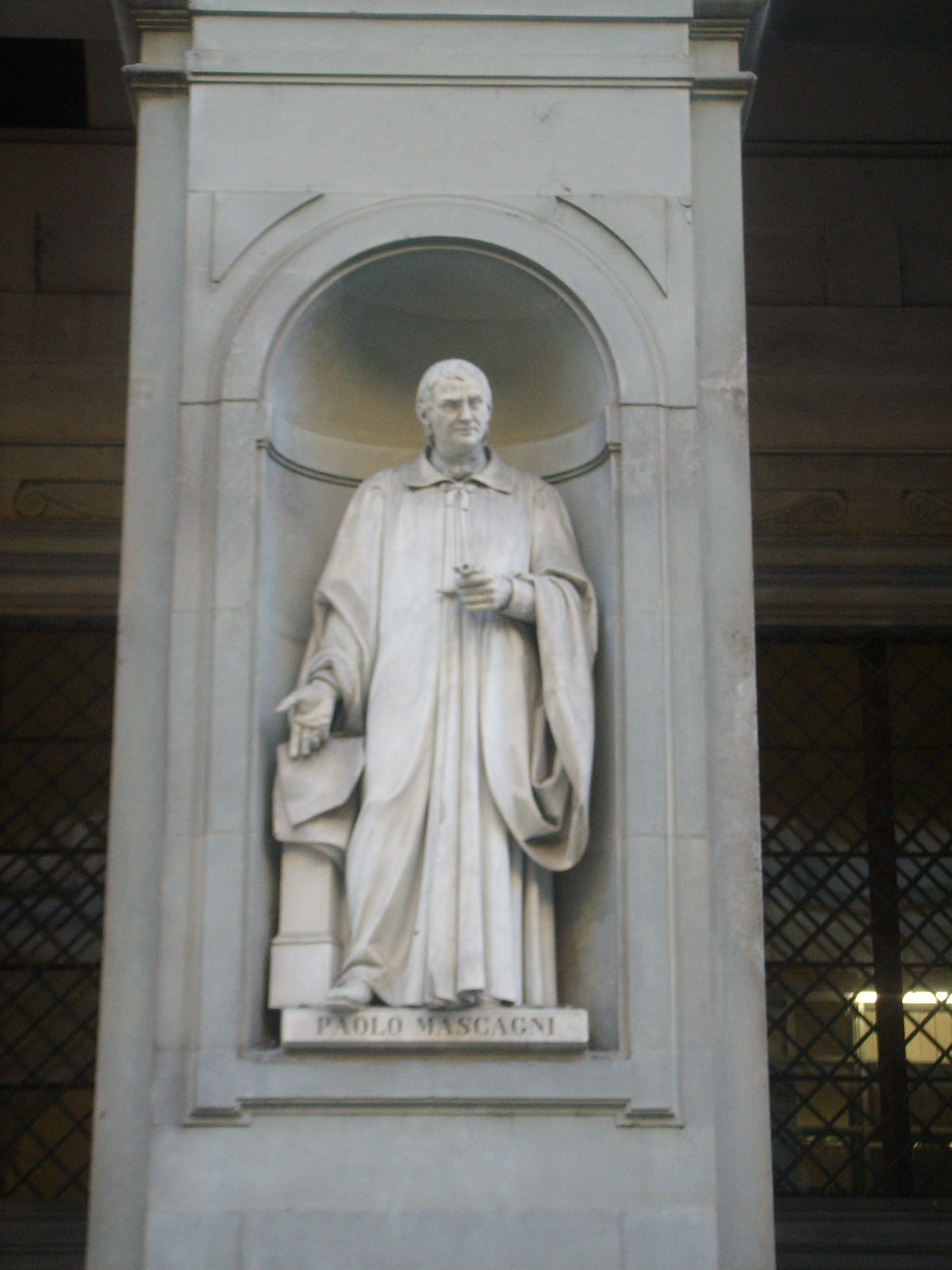
The statue of Mascagni at the Uffizi

Paolo Mascagni (25 January 1755 (Note: This is the most probable date, but some place his birth date on January 28 or February 5.) – 19 October 1815) was an Italian physician and anatomist. He is most well known for publishing the first complete description of the lymphatic system.

== Biography ==
=== Early life ===
Mascagni was born in the comune of Pomarance (in the Province of Pisa) to Aurelio Mascagni and Elisabetta Burroni, both belonging to old gentry families of Chiusdino (in the Province of Siena). He studied philosophy and medicine at the University of Siena. Upon graduating in 1777, renowned anatomist Pietro Tabarrani took Mascagni as an assistant. Upon Tabarrani's death in 1780, Mascagni was appointed as an anatomy lecturer at the University of Siena.

=== Career ===
Table illustrating the lymphatic system from Mascagni's Vasorum lymphaticorum corporis humani historia et ichnographia

As a young man, Mascagni was interested in geological sciences, as evidenced by his several papers on the Lagoni (thermal springs) of Siena and Volterra. Upon graduation, he turned his interest to the human lymphatic system. His many discoveries in this field led to the composition and publication of Vasorum lymphaticorum corporis humani historia et iconographia in 1787. He was elected a corresponding member of the Royal Swedish Academy of Sciences in 1796, and president of the Accademia dei Fisiocritici in 1798.

During the French occupation of Tuscany in the spring of 1799, Mascagni showed himself to be an enthusiastic Jacobin. For this reason, he spent seven months in prison after the French were expelled. Mascagni was freed from prison by a motu proprio of the King of Etruria, who on 22 October 1801 appointed Mascagni a professor of anatomy at the University of Pisa, with the additional charge of lecturing twice a week at the Hospital of Santa Maria Nuova in Florence.

In 1807, Mascagni was appointed professor of anatomy at the University of Florence. There, he wrote Treatise of Anatomy.

=== Collaborations ===
In 1781, Mascagni began advising sculptor Clemente Susini, who was working on a collection of human anatomical waxes. The collection was completed in 1786 and consisted of approximately 800 pieces.

In 1801, the Sardinian anatomist Francesco Antonio Boi became a student of Mascagni. Mascagni and Boi entered into a close collaboration as well as a personal friendship. The anatomical waxes are held in the Museo archeologico nazionale in Cagliari.

=== Death ===
Mascagni died of sepsis in 1815. Upon his death, the Sienese nobleman Giulio del Taia commissioned the Neoclassical sculptor Stefano Ricci to create a marble cenotaph for Mascagni, which is now housed at the Accademia dei Fisiocritici. Some decades after his death, his statue was erected in the courtyard of the Uffizi.

== Legacy ==
Mascagni posthumously published two works:

- Prodromo della grande anatomia (1821)
- Anatomicae universae iconae (1823)

Mascagni has been posthumously credited with the first discovery of meningeal lymphatic vessels, though his findings were disregarded during his lifetime. These vessels were conclusively discovered in mice in 2014 and subsequently confirmed in humans and non-human primates in 2017.

== See also ==
- François Carlo Antommarchi

== Bibliography ==
- Orsini, Davide; Saverino, Daniele; Martini, Mariano (June 2024). "The Anatomia Universa (1823) of Paolo Mascagni (1755–1815): The memory of a masterpiece in the history of anatomy after two centuries". Translational Research in Anatomy. 35. doi:10.1016/j.tria.2024.100285.
