= Verona Arsenal =

Military Establishment in Verona, Italy

Campagnola Artillery Arsenal
- Artillerie arsenal Franz Josef I, Verona Arsenal, Austrian Arsenal of Verona
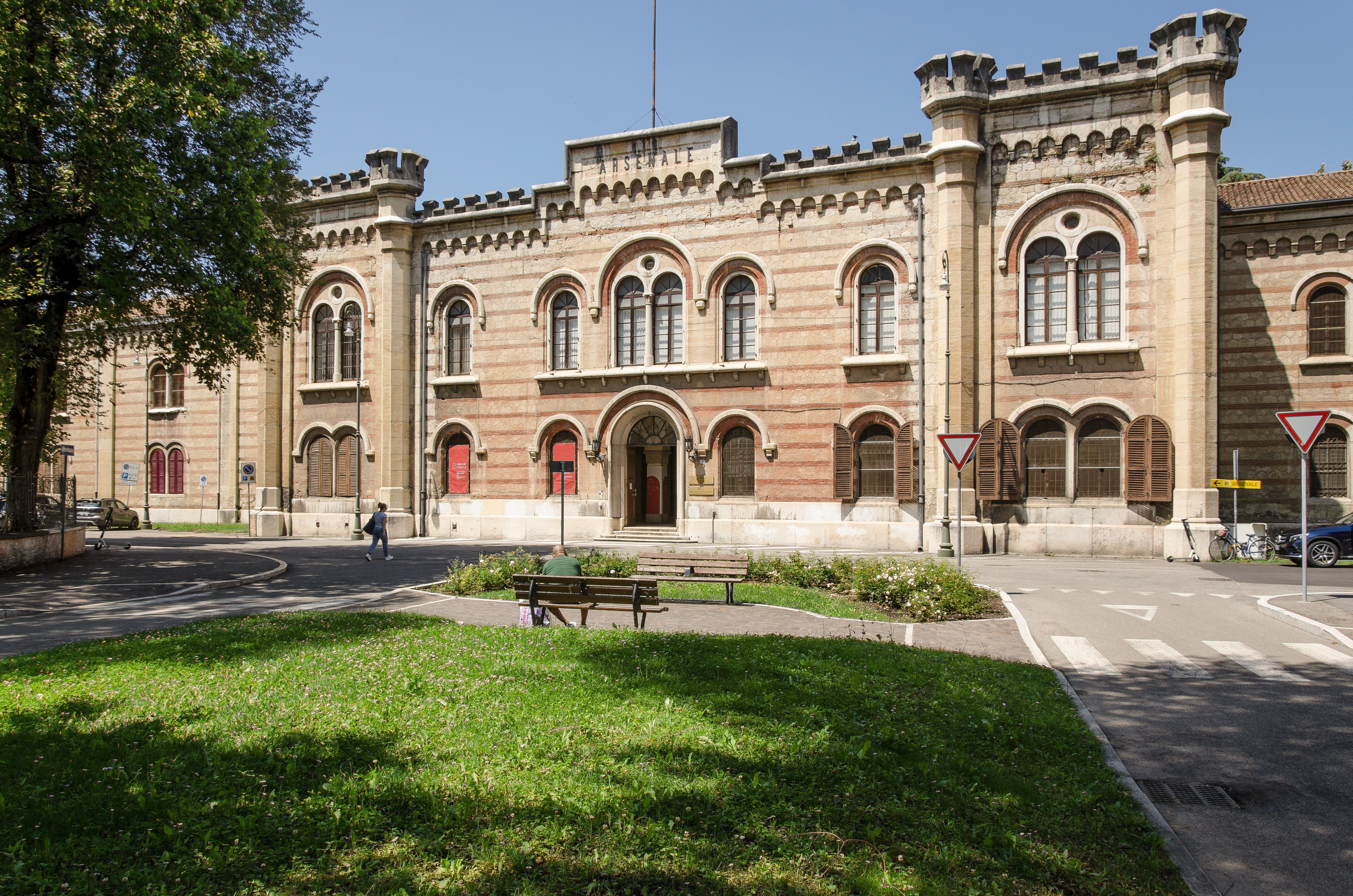
- Command Pavilion of the Arsenal
- Interactive map of Campagnola Artillery Arsenal
- Type: Military arsenal
- Location: Borgo Trento, Verona, Italy
- Coordinates: 45.4432°N 10.9870°E

Construction
- Completed: 1854–1861

Other
- Designer: Conrad Petrasch, General Genie Direction

The Campagnola Artillery Arsenal, originally called the Artillery Arsenal Franz Josef I but better known as the Verona Arsenal or the Austrian Arsenal of Verona, is a military establishment built by the Austrian Empire in Verona, now located in the Borgo Trento district. Preliminary studies and elaboration of the project, wanted by Field Marshal Josef Radetzky, took place in 1854 with the choice of the executive design by Major (later Lieutenant Colonel) Conrad Petrasch, director of the Genie-Direktion in Verona. Construction of the arsenal was completed in 1861 according to the reduced design of 1859.

== History ==
=== Context ===
Verona has always played a strategic role due to its geographical location at the crossroads of numerous communication routes. Because of this position, it was perfectly poised to become the main stronghold of the Lombardy-Venetia Kingdom; it thus became the pivotal point of the so-called "Quadrilateral," which was set up around 1850: the Scaliger city, well protected by the nearby fortresses of Peschiera, Legnago, and Mantua, assumed the role of "military depot" since it was directly connected to Austria via the road to the Brenner Pass. Within the magisterial walls, which the Austrians rebuilt the parts demolished by the Napoleonic militia in modern style, several military complexes thus found their place, of fundamental importance especially in the event of war, when Verona would be transformed into a support point for the war operations of an army containing around 100,000 soldiers: in addition to the arsenal, imposing buildings such as the army military hospital, the provide of Santa Marta and the large barracks of Castel San Pietro and Campone were built.

The design, construction supervision, and management of these works were followed by the k.k.Genie-Direktion Verona, the Verona office for fortifications of the Army Corps of Engineers, which naturally reported to Vienna. However, Austrian Field Marshal Josef Radetzky, assisted by Franz von Scholl, initiated this process of transforming the city into the main maneuvering square and depot for the army of the Lombard-Venetian Kingdom.

=== Project and construction ===
The various military establishments built between the 1850s and 1860s thus include the artillery arsenal, named after Emperor Franz Joseph I. This was built between 1854 and 1861 in the so-called "Campagnola," a vast flat area enclosed in the meander of the Adige River, outside the historic city and opposite the ancient fortress of Castelvecchio. It was then intended to house the Artillery Directorate (whose technical services had been present in the town since 1849) and to provide logistical support for the numerous military strongholds of the Lombardy-Venetia Kingdom.

The choice of the area on which to build this important complex fell on the Campagnola because this was difficult to access in the event of an insurrection of the city, but also because it was strategically located concerning road and rail communication routes with Austria (in fact, it was directly connected with the road to Austria and not far from the Parona railroad yard, located along the Brenner railway) and because it was well defended both by the Adige River and by several military fortifications (in particular the hill forts, the bastion of Spain and the fortifications of Porta San Giorgio).

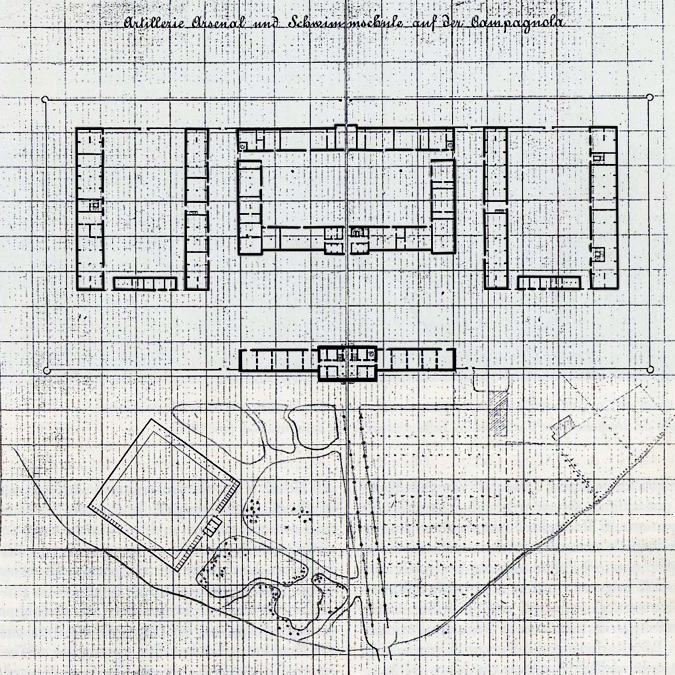
The floor plan of the complex was built, with the Military Swim School pool on the lower left, the Command pavilion in the center, and the three courts with the laboratories, storerooms, and stables at the top.

The military engineering offices, headed by Lieutenant Colonel Conrad Petrasch, produced an initial plan of the arsenal in 1854, probably taking as a reference the arsenal in Vienna, built between 1848 and 1859 and thus slightly preceding the one in Verona. The design reflected the typical structure of the nineteenth-century artillery arsenal, organized into several bodies of buildings arranged symmetrically in functional courts, according to the logical sequence of construction, maintenance, storage, and storage operations for heavy and light weapons. The original plan envisioned a complex of imposing size, laid out over an area of 11-13 hectares on which 16 bodies of buildings were to be built, with a wall that would divide the complex into two sectors of similar size: the southern sector, facing the city, would be for the artillery in use in the stronghold, while the northern sector would be for country (or war) artillery.

This extensive project suffered a cutback in 1859 because of the assignment to the relevant regiments of the maintenance and custody of the campaign artillery; thus the design of the southern section alone was carried forward, albeit curtailed by the two residential wings to the side of the so-called "Command pavilion," while the northernmost section, with the five large buildings in which the warehouses for the carriages, barrels, harnesses, and carpentry timbers would be located, was temporarily shelved.

Thus, the 1859 plan, completed as early as 1861, was realized: the three large courtyard blocks were built, thus made to separate the spaces intended for the workshops from the warehouses and stables, while on the southern front, as anticipated, only the Command pavilion was built, as the Austrian officers who were to be housed in the two buildings on either side of the main pavilion instead found a place in Castelvecchio, at that time used as barracks; the Command pavilion itself was also downsized, while the stables buildings were made larger than budgeted. Compared to the 1854 plan, a long enclosure wall measuring 392 x 176 meters was also added, with watchtowers at the four corners, instead of simple perimeter walls connecting the various buildings, to better isolate the complex. In its final conformation, therefore, the arsenal consisted of nine building bodies.

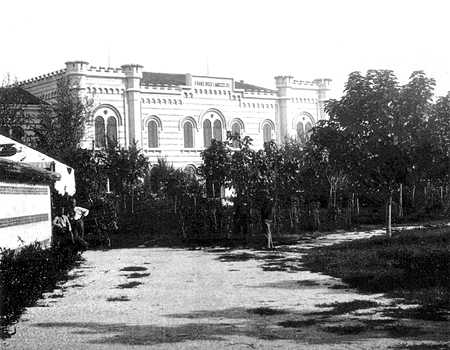
The Command Pavilion in 1866, a few years after its construction.

The intended use of the spaces was as follows:

- The Command Pavilion, located in the center of the southern front, housed the offices and the trophy and weapons rooms;
- Blacksmiths', wheelwrights', carpenters', and saddlers' workshops were concentrated in the central courtyard, except in the southern building where the offices of the draughtsmen, administrators, and model archives were located instead;
- In the side courts, on the other hand, warehouses, and stables were placed (the latter in the buildings located to the south).

Instead, the fireworks workshop was placed inside Castelvecchio, easily accessible via the Scaliger Bridge. Right in axis with this was thus placed the main entrance to the arsenal, which in its final configuration extended over about 6.9 hectares, about 2 of which were covered by buildings. Two other entrances opened on either side of the Command Pavilion, while a third access route was to the rear, toward the Campagnola.

Thus, the main role of the arsenal was the maintenance and storage of small arms and artillery, especially fortress pieces; in addition, barrels, accessories for the various pieces, harnesses, and campaign tools were made. In the same area of the Campagnola, moreover, between 1849 and 1856 the establishment of the Military School of Swimming was planned, which was built in 1864, three years after the construction of the arsenal was completed. The facility was rather simple and included a square pool surrounded by a low fence, on the southeast side of which were the locker rooms and the main entrance to the establishment.

=== Subsequent transformations ===
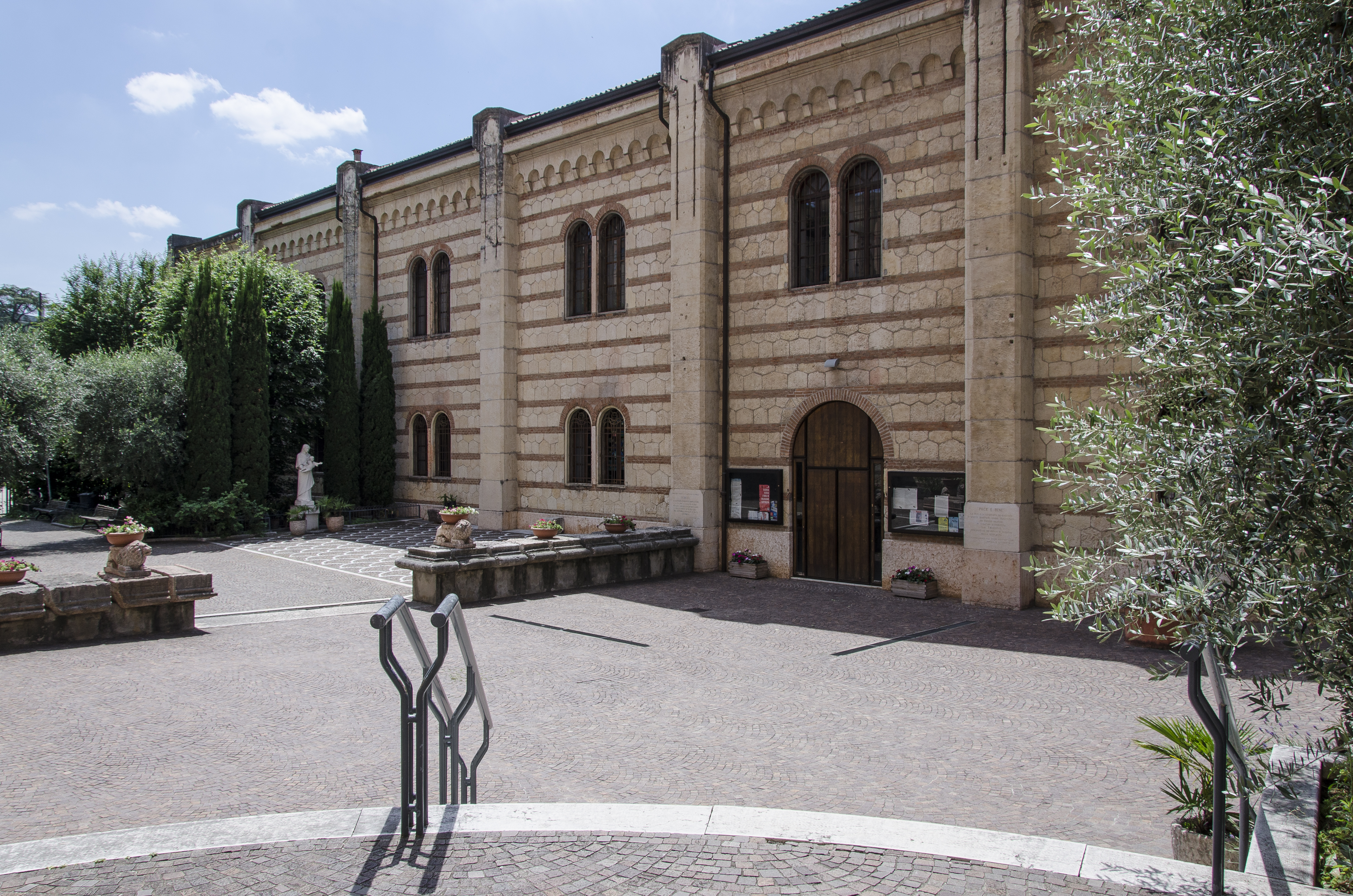
Church of St. Francis of Assisi, one of the re-functionalized pavilions of the arsenal. The restoration project was designed by Veronese architect Libero Cecchini.

Between 1923 and 1935, in a phase of Campagnola's transformation into a new housing district, the complex underwent its first transformations; in particular, in 1935 the structures of the Military Swimming School establishment were demolished, of which only the large pool survived, downsized and placed within a new public park that still characterizes this part of the city. Around the same years, several buildings were constructed within the arsenal, including two Rundbogen-style buildings built on the northern side of the two side courts and a number of sheds within them. Other sheds were also later built to the south of the same courts.

The complex was severely damaged by Allied aerial bombardment in World War II: the Command pavilion was hit in the central body and eastern wing, so the original structures were later replaced by horizontal and vertical structures of reinforced concrete and brickwork; the southern building in the central court was damaged in the upper part, which was rebuilt partially transformed; in the eastern court, the two-story warehouse, hit by the same aerial bombardment, was three-quarters destroyed in the plan and left in the state of ruins for years.

The consequence was that in the postwar period the arsenal, heavily damaged and located across from a demolished bridge, lost so much value that it ended up among the disposable assets of the state property, while the city master plan called for its complete demolition to make way for a public park and about 1.4 hectares of building lots. This lack of interest in the complex ended up causing real material damage to it over time: in the 1950s, when the layout of Viale della Repubblica was defined in the Borgo Trento urban plan, the entire northeastern corner of the arsenal's enclosure wall was demolished, along with the watchtower; along with them, the head of the two-story building originally used as a warehouse was also demolished; finally, in the 1960s, two more of the four watchtowers were demolished along the western side.

As the years went by, the army did its best to repair the damage in the buildings in use, while the desire to sell the complex waned to the extent that in the 1975 variant of the master plan, the area continued to be designated as a public park, yes, but without the provision for the demolition of the buildings, which were instead retained; provision was also made for the future construction of a parish within the plant, thus identifying an additional function of public value. In the 1980s, then, the two-story building in the eastern courtyard, partly destroyed by bombing and partly demolished to make way for Republic Avenue, was given to the Curia and restored to a design by Veronese architect Libero Cecchini to make way for the church of St. Francis of Assisi.

=== Recovery of the establishment ===
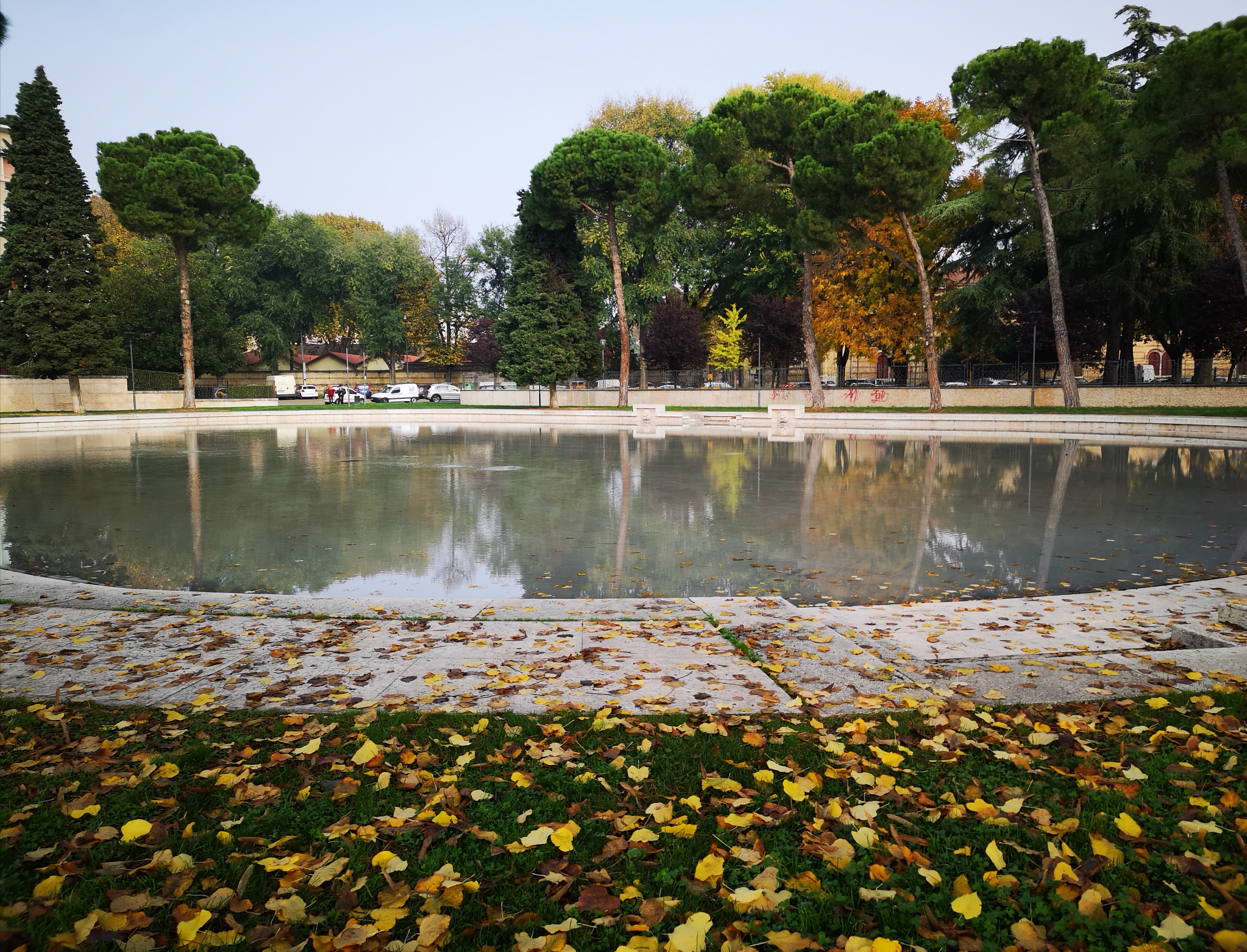
The basin located in front of the arsenal, was reclaimed to a design by architect David Chipperfield.

The arsenal, used first by the Royal Italian Army and then by the Italian Army, was acquired by the City of Verona on June 15, 1995. However, the final handover did not take place until May 19, 2009. Up to the time of the handover, the complex was in fairly good condition. Still, since its abandonment by the military, it has fallen into a state of underutilization and disrepair: only the Headquarters pavilion has hosted periodic exhibitions, while a building in the western courtyard was assigned for many years to the Traffic Police. The sheds in the eastern part have been used as a parking lot.

Following the acquisition of the area, however, the municipality announced a competition for the redevelopment of the arsenal, which was won in 1999 by the firm of David Chipperfield, whose master plan was approved in 2006: the British architect's project included the recovery of the historic structures and the construction of new volumes, as well as the arrangement of the space outside the actual establishment. The restoration and re-functionalization project was later abandoned, probably because it was too onerous, however, the project to fix up the large swimming pool continued, and the intervention was inaugurated in September 2011.

This project included the reduction of the asphalt spaces in Arsenale Square and a better connection between the green areas located between that and the Scaliger Bridge, as well as the restoration of the monumental fountain located in the southern corner of the former swimming pool; the latter was then transformed, reducing its depth from one meter to a few centimeters and covering the surface in black basalt slabs, to increase the reflecting effect of the thin layer of water. This area, soon after its inauguration, thus became once again a popular and popular place for meeting and recreation, particularly because of the ample presence of green spaces without physical barriers and the presence of the large body of water, which is fully accessible thanks to its shallow depth.

== Description ==
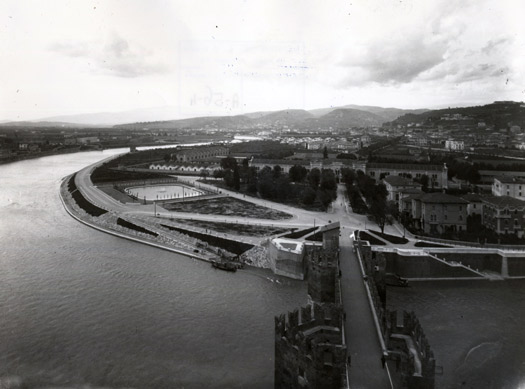
View from the Castelvecchio keep toward the Austrian arsenal. Also noted on the left is the swimming pool of the Military School of Swimming.

The arsenal consists of the nine original buildings mutually proportioned and ordered by the principle of symmetry, as well as some bodies added later; it is characterized as a spatial ensemble enclosed by the defensive enclosure, originally with a rectangular layout of 392 m by 176 m, with a total area of 6.9 hectares. A straight road connects it, to the south, with the Castelvecchio bridge, and to the north with the Borgo Trento neighborhood (but originally with the road to Trento). The inner space was planned as a part of the city, with streets, squares, courtyards, and pavilion buildings, stylistically homogeneous with each other but differentiated by different dimensions and volumetric articulations. In the center of the southern side of the boundary wall is inserted the building that was intended for management activities, the so-called Command Pavilion. The other buildings are arranged to form three large courtyard blocks, originally enclosed to separate the spaces for the workshops, blacksmiths, carpenters, and saddlers, gathered in the central courtyard from the warehouses and stables, which faced the two side courts.

The wide open spaces ensured optimal conditions of salubriousness, ventilation, and exposure. The connecting paths between the various pavilions, paved with cobblestones or simply graveled, were also provided with stone trotting paths appropriate for the large loads carried by arsenal wagons and artillery. In addition to functional needs, the open spaces, configured as public gardens, contributed to qualifying the architecture of the entire complex.

In the architecture of the complex, Romantic culture could originally be observed in the figurative relationship with the surrounding landscape: in fact, the arsenal established a harmonious balance with the dominant natural elements, such as the bend of the Adige River, the countryside cultivated with vegetable gardens and orchards, and the hills behind, but also with the monuments of the Veronese Middle Ages, the Basilica of San Zeno to the west, Castelvecchio with the Scaliger bridge to the south, and the turreted hillside city wall to the east. The development of the Borgo Trento neighborhood surrounded the arsenal with residential buildings that interrupted this relationship with the natural and historic landscape. Only the front-facing Castelvecchio maintains the relationship with the greenery already present in the original design.

=== Command Pavilion ===
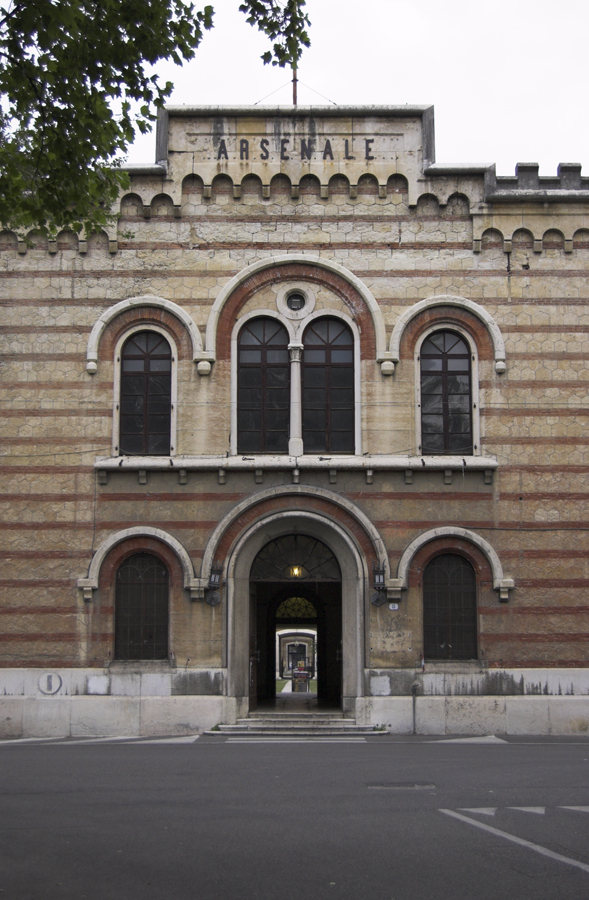
Detail of the central part of the Command Hall, showing the entrance to the plant.

In the entire complex, the architectural composition in the Neo-Romanesque style (Rundbogenstil, Italian for "style of the round arch") takes place on the tone of Veronese Romanesque; the decorative elements of the Rundbogen are thus combined with the polychrome planked face of tuff and brick. The application of the Rundbogenstil not only concerns the decorative component of the buildings, and in particular of the Command pavilion but involves the structural design, mostly of square or quadrangular base modules characterized by the vault and pillar system, which is particularly suited to the functional requirements of the depots and laboratories.

The Command Pavilion (Hauptgebäude) has a tripartite linear development plan, consisting of a central body and two side wings. The central block was originally intended for the executive offices and trophy room, and the two side wings for the armory workshops and armory. Elegant is the structural layout of the armories, consisting of bohemian brick arches and vaults. The volumetric tripartition corresponds to the different figurative treatment of the elevations, richer in the central body, and simpler in the side bodies. The middle, higher part is itself tripartite in a central element and two head elements, tower-like. In the central element, the succession of arched openings stands out, with the motif of the large four-light window above the entrance portal; in the towers, mullioned windows in two orders stand out. The side, tower-like elements are bordered vertically by octagonal pillars, partially projecting from the wall, and concluded by crenelated crowning. The elevations of the two lateral bodies, on the other hand, are characterized by the succession of the six pilasters delimiting five bays, in the center of which, on two orders, open mullioned windows, marked by arched stone cornices, overhanging. Finally, each edge of the side bodies is reinforced by three octagonal pillars, connected to strongly connote the building's corners. The eaves apparatus of the building is formed by hanging arches and stylized battlements.

=== Courtyard buildings ===
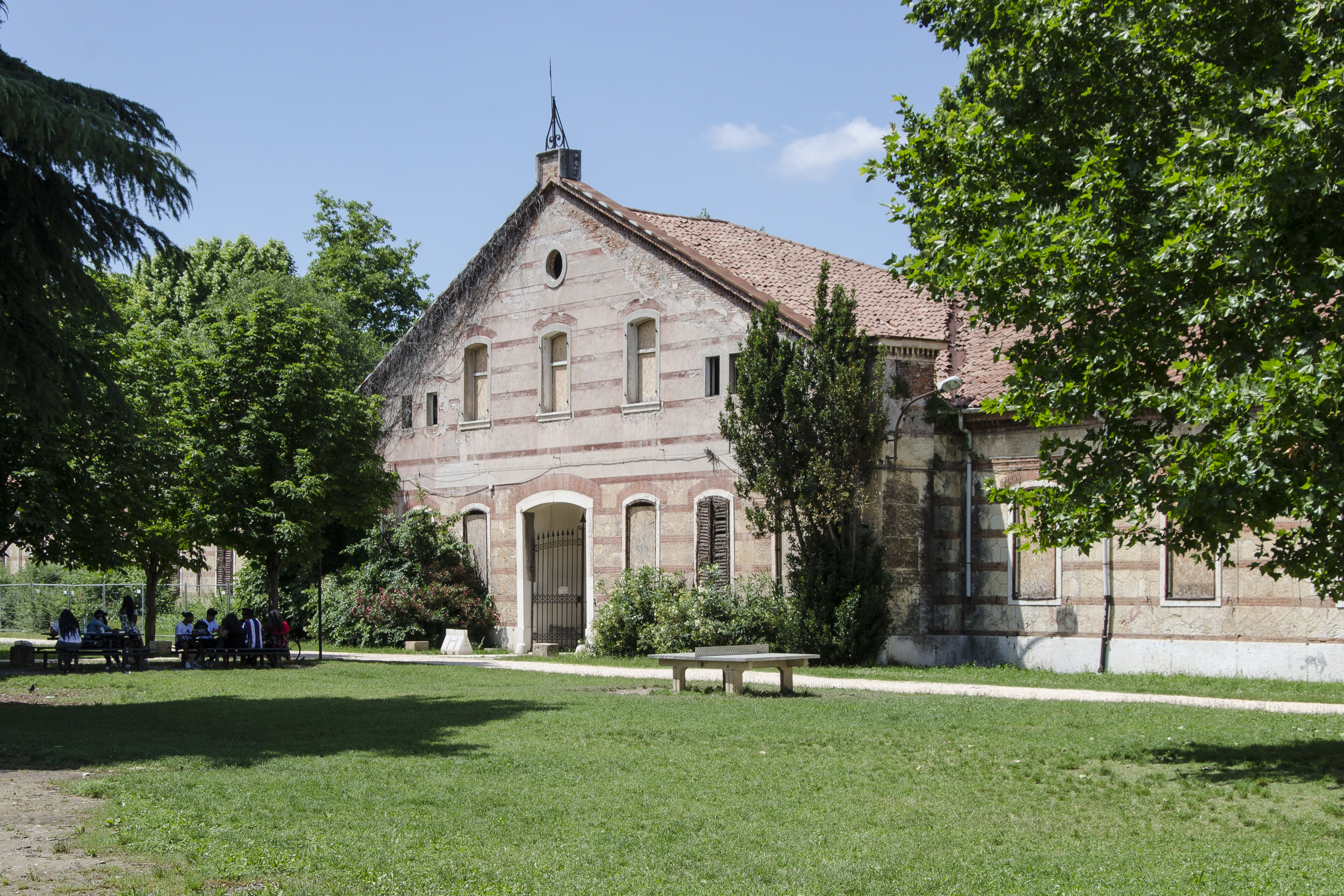
The main body of the central courtyard was originally occupied by offices and archives.

Two single-story buildings are arranged around the central courtyard: one with a rectilinear plan along the north side, and one with a C-shaped plan (arranged along the south, east, and west sides). Originally the central part of the southern building, rising two stories plus the attic, was reserved for the designer's office, the model archive, and the administrative office, while the ground floor of the side wings was for laboratories; in the rectilinear northern body, all the fire work was united, with the power plant for the steam engine. In all elevations, decorative elements are reduced to the essentials: pilasters and cornices enrich the gable ends, and all openings are surrounded by stone cornices.

The two side courts each consist of three buildings with a rectilinear plan. The two larger buildings, organized on two levels (the former warehouses), are located along the east and west sides; on the southern side of the courtyard, alongside the two entrance portals, are the two smaller buildings, originally used as stables. Arranged toward the central courtyard, on the other hand, are the smaller warehouses, organized planimetrically with two naves.

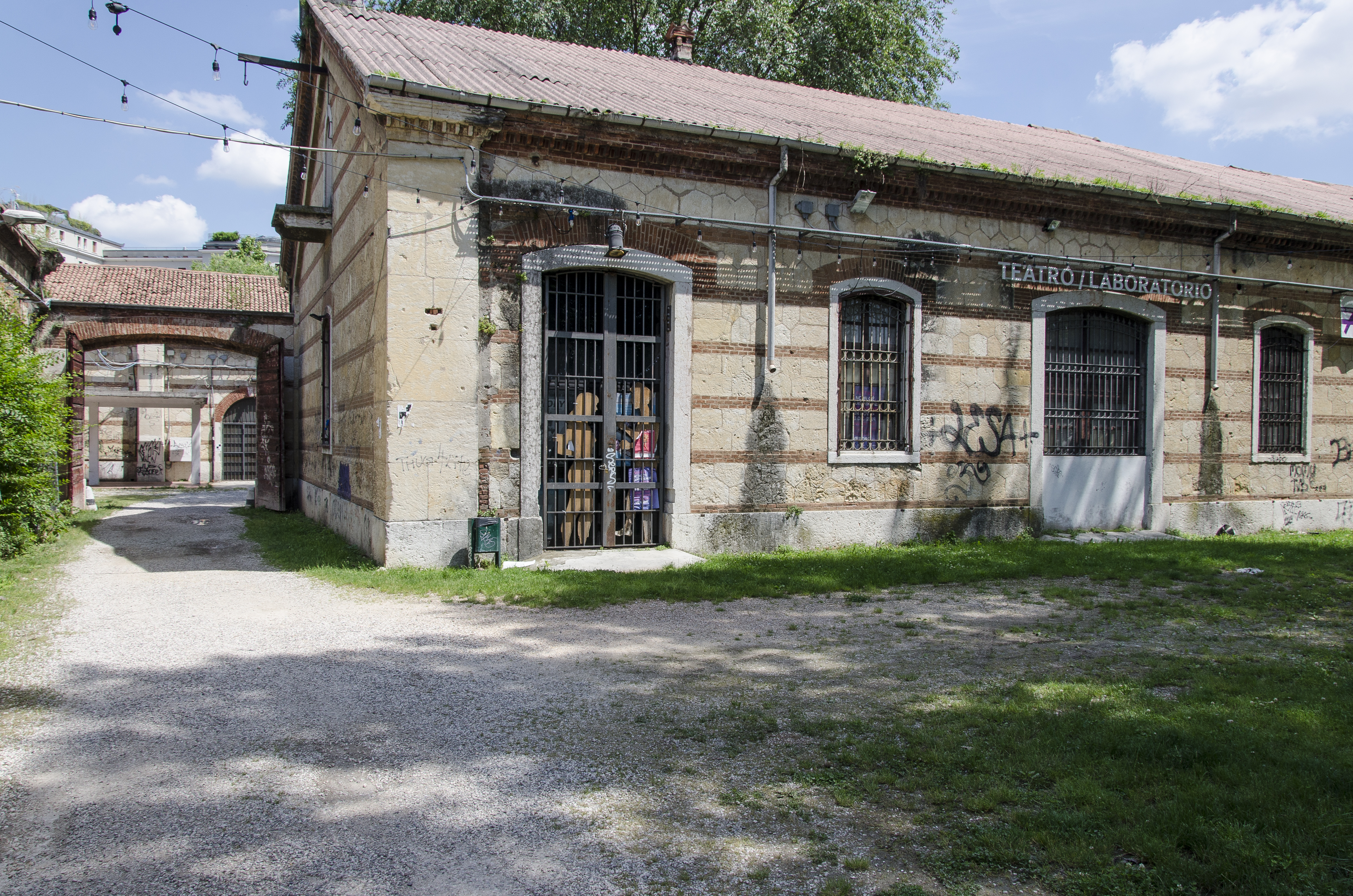
The former laboratory building by the central courtyard.

The two-story buildings, arranged along the sides of the courts facing the enclosure wall, are built with the same structural layout as the smaller warehouses: piers, arches, and rib vaults. The composition of their elevations is characterized by the succession of buttresses projecting from the walls and elevated beyond the eave line. Arched mullioned windows open in the bays, on two orders, or large arched passages, on the ground floor. Each bay is crowned by hanging arches surmounted by a strongly projecting freestone cornice, aligned with the plane of the buttresses. The smaller, single-story warehouses are quite similar to those just described in terms of the compositional features of the facades.

=== City wall ===
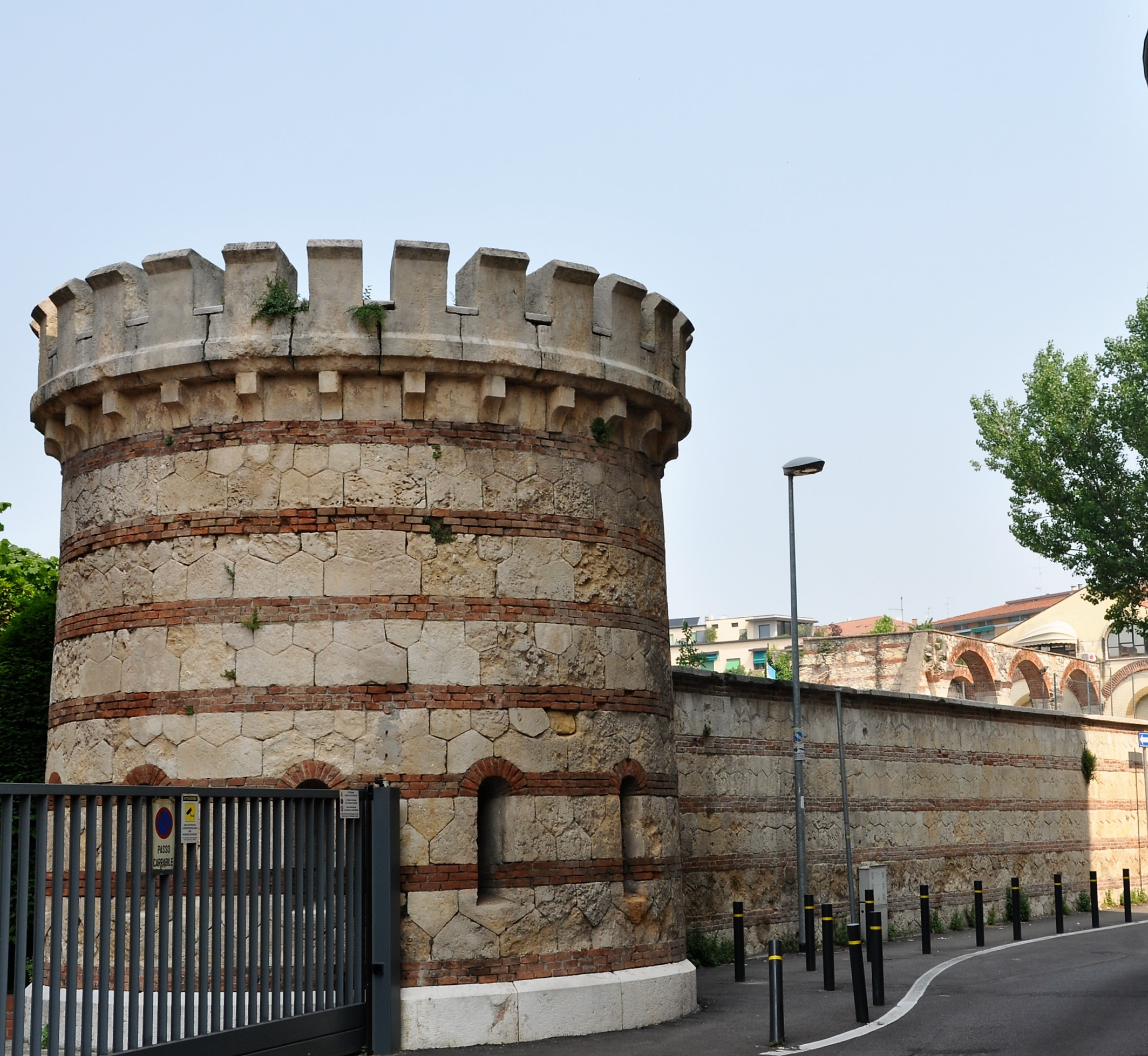
Watchtower and city wall.

The enclosing wall, also built of tuff and brick-lined masonry, was originally rectangular in layout and equipped with four guard towers with a circular plan, projecting at the apexes. The towers, cylindrical and tapering slightly upward, rose on two floors; they were then covered by a vaulted brick structure, which supported the upper terrace floor. The medieval appearance is accentuated by the crenelated projecting apparatus supported by corbels of freestone. On the perimeter, on the ground floor, radial gun embrasures open.

The three entrances, with tufa ashlar pillars, crowned by freestone polyhedrons and a wrought-iron gate, were still open in the enclosure. Two entrances are located to the south, on either side of the Command pavilion while the third is located in the center of the northern side, on the axis of the road that connects the complex with the neighborhood.

== See also ==
- Monuments of Verona
- Verona
- Austrian Empire
- Kingdom of Lombardy–Venetia
- Castelvecchio (Verona)

== Bibliography ==
- Bozzetto, Lino Vittorio (1998). Verona e Vienna. Gli arsenali dell'imperatore : architettura militare e citta nell'Ottocento [Verona and Vienna. The emperor's arsenals: military architecture and the city in the nineteenth century.] (in Italian). Verona, Cierre.
- Jacobacci, Vittorio (1980). La piazzaforte di Verona sotto la dominazione austriaca 1814-1866 [The stronghold of Verona under Austrian rule 1814-1866] (in Italian). Verona:Cassa di Risparmio di Verona Vicenza e Belluno.
- Perbellini, Gianni (2013). "L'Arsenale militare veronese dalla fondazione austriaca alla sua trasmissione al Regno d'Italia" [The Verona Military Arsenal from its Austrian foundation to its transmission to the Kingdom of Italy] (PDF). Notiziario. Ordine degli ingegneri di Verona e provincia (in Italian). nº118: 19.
- Sartori, Alberto Maria (2013). "L'Arsenale di Verona:…chi ribatte da proda e chi da poppa" [The Arsenal of Verona: ...who rebels from the bow and who from the stern...(Dante Inf. XXI,14)] (PDF). Notiziario.Ordine degli ingegneri di Verona e provincia (in Italian). nº118.
