= Castelvecchio (Verona) =

Castle in Verona, Italy

Coordinates: 45.43973°N 10.98785°E

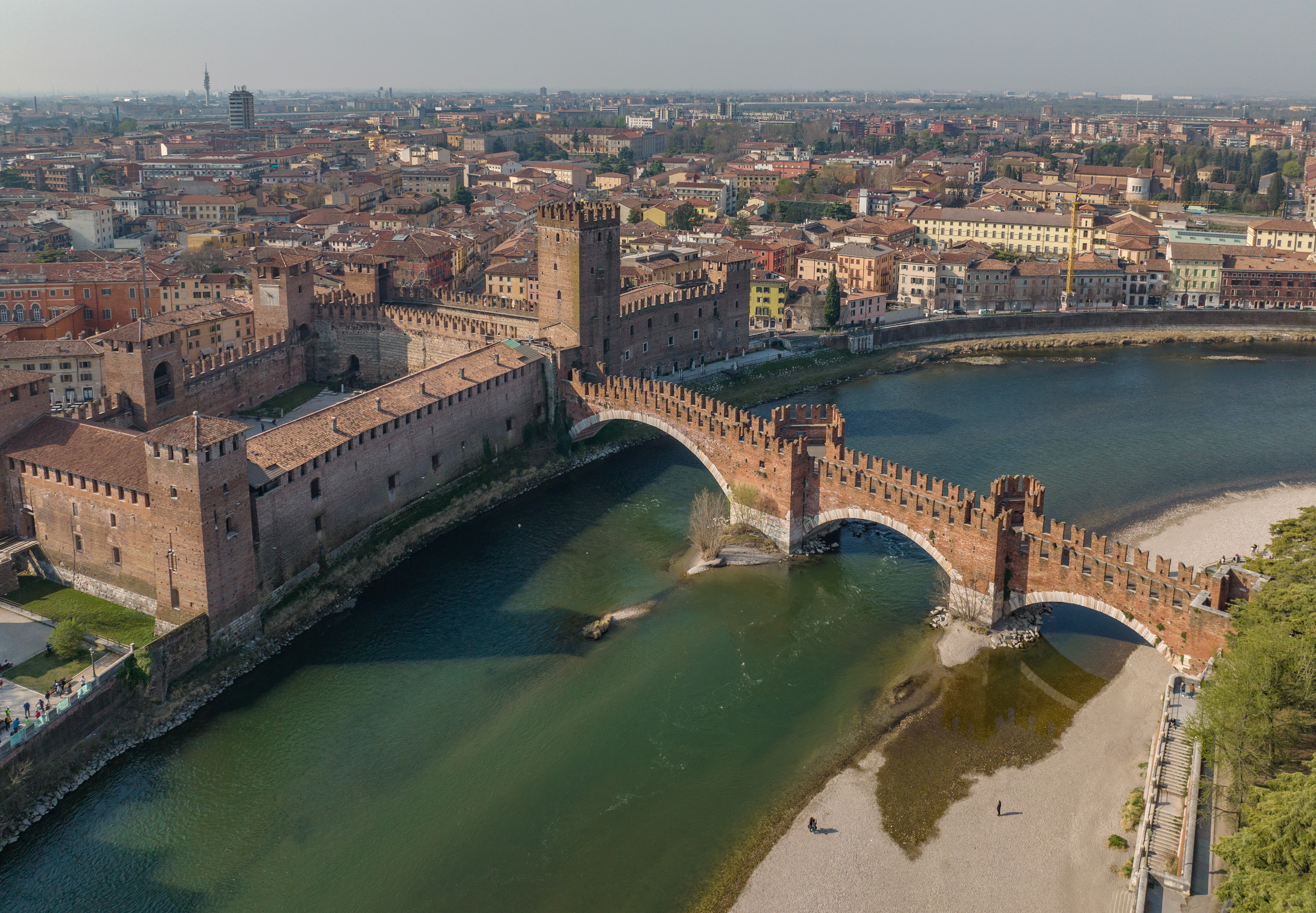
Castelvecchio and the Castelvecchio Bridge

Castelvecchio ("Old Castle") is a castle in Verona, northern Italy. It is the most important military construction of the Scaliger dynasty that ruled the city in the Middle Ages.

The castle is powerful and compact, with very little decoration — a square compound built of red brick, one of the most prominent examples of Gothic architecture of the age, with imposing M-shaped merlons running along the castle and bridge walls. It has seven towers, a superelevated keep (maschio) with four main buildings inside. The castle is surrounded by a ditch, now dry, which was once filled with water from the nearby Adige.

Castelvecchio is now home to the Castelvecchio Museum and the local officers' club, which can be accessed through the left door on Corso Cavour.

== History ==
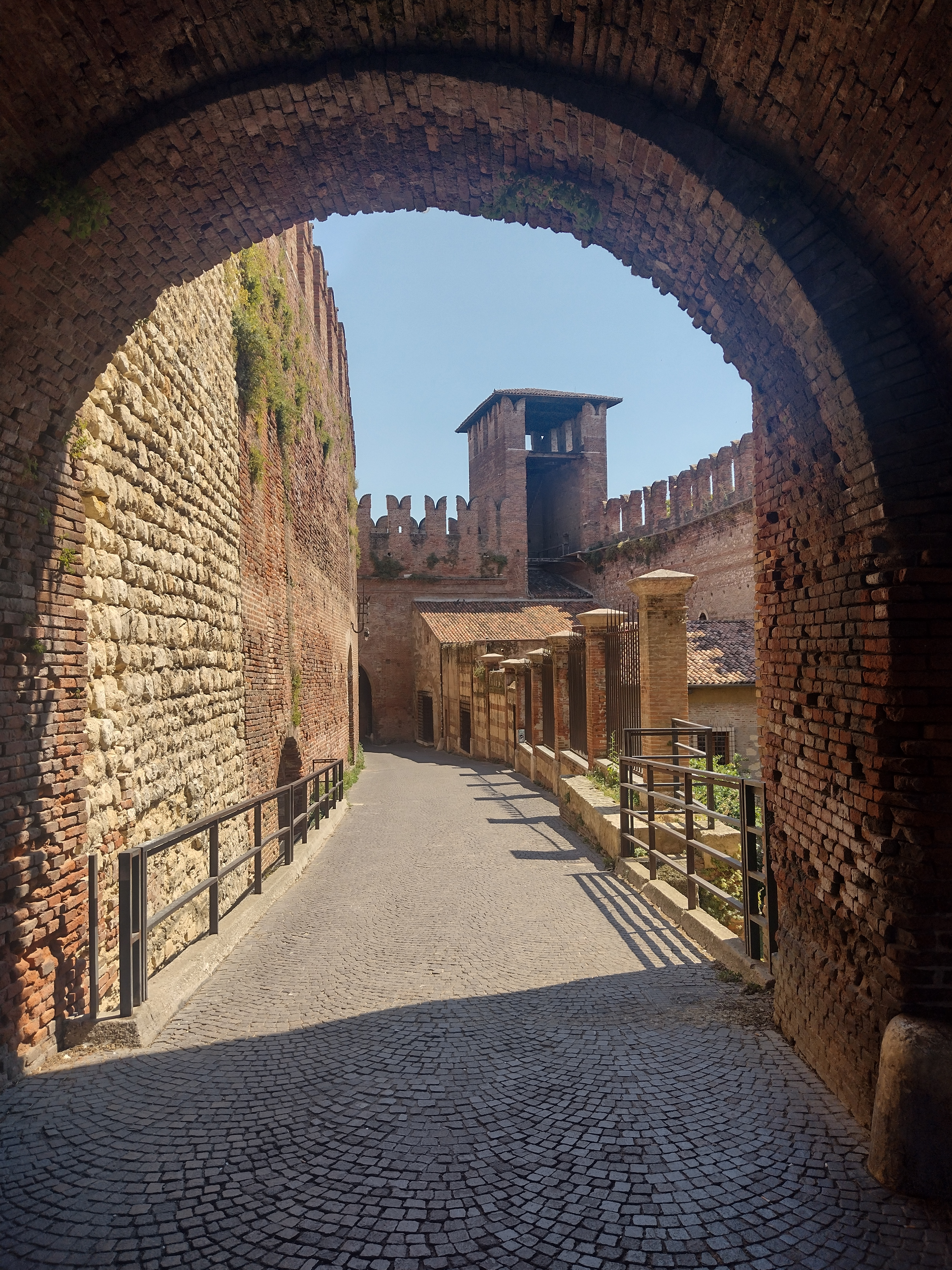
Interior view

The castle stands on the probable location of a Roman fortress outside the Roman city. Lord Cangrande II della Scala had it built along with its bridge across the Adige River as a deterrent to his powerful neighbors, such as Venice, the Gonzaga, and the Sforza families. Construction was carried out between 1354 and 1376 (Cangrande died in 1359). The fortified bridge was intended to allow the seigniors to escape safely northwards to the Tyrol in the event of a rebellion or a coup d'état (the Scaligeri were allies of the Holy Roman Empire), and when they eventually lost their hold on Verona, its surviving members left Italy to found a German branch of the family.

Later, during the Venetian domination, the bridge was further fortified with cannons. The castle was damaged by French troops during the Napoleonic Wars (1796–7), in retaliation for the Pasque Veronesi, when the local population staged a violent anti-French revolt. Napoleon chose to stay in Castelvecchio on his trips to Verona. Still, his widespread and arbitrary requisitions of citizens' and churches' property, and the massive draft of male workers into the French army, prompted the resistance that eventually drove out the invaders.

The bridge was destroyed by the retreating German army in 1945 and rebuilt in 1949.

Under the Austrians, Castelvecchio was turned into barracks.

In 1923, the castle was restored, as well as in 1963–1965.

== See also ==
- History of Verona
- Scaliger
- Castelvecchio Bridge
- Verona trial
- Verona Arsenal
