= National Archaeological Museum, Cagliari =

Coordinates: 39.221944°N 9.116944°E

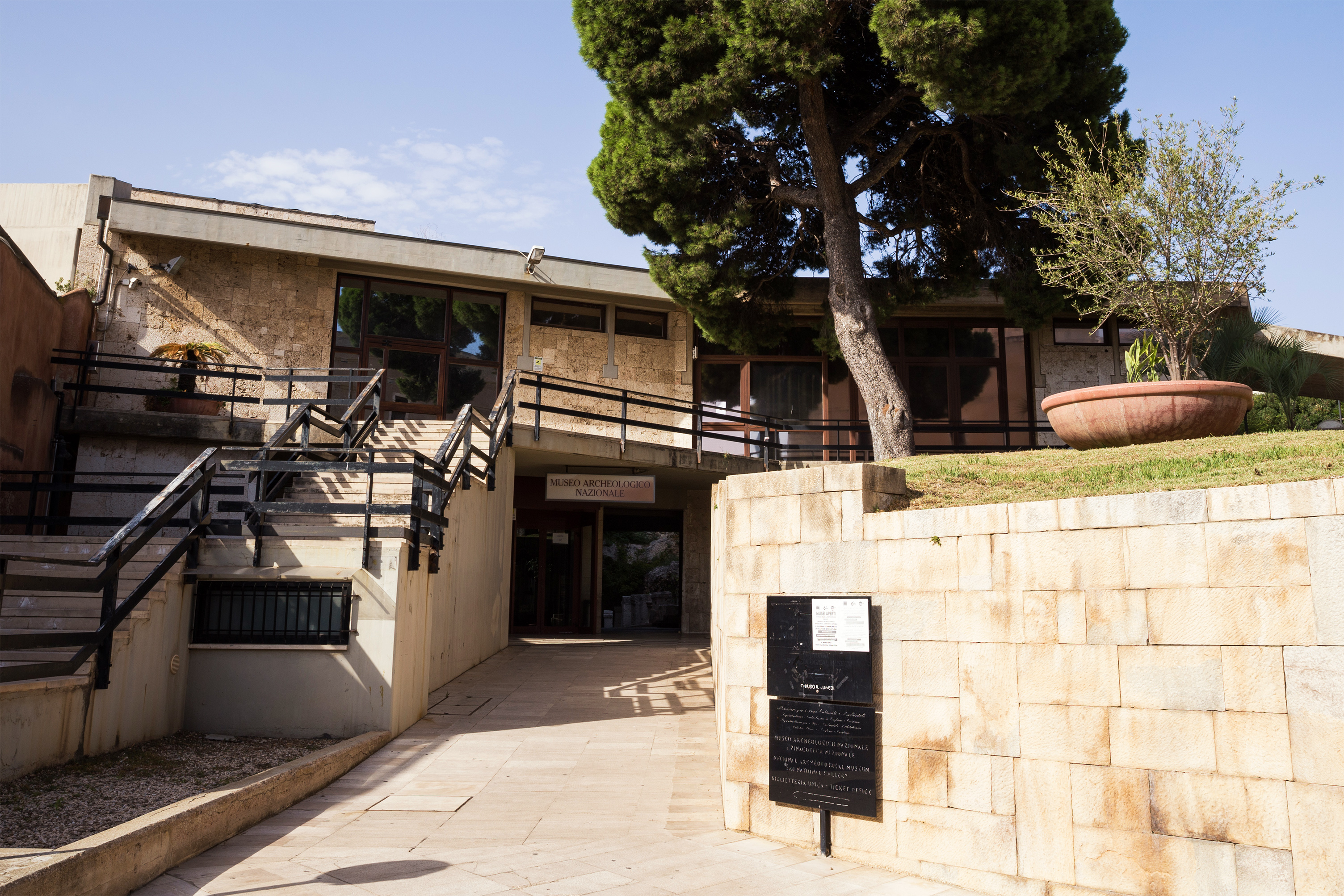
The museum

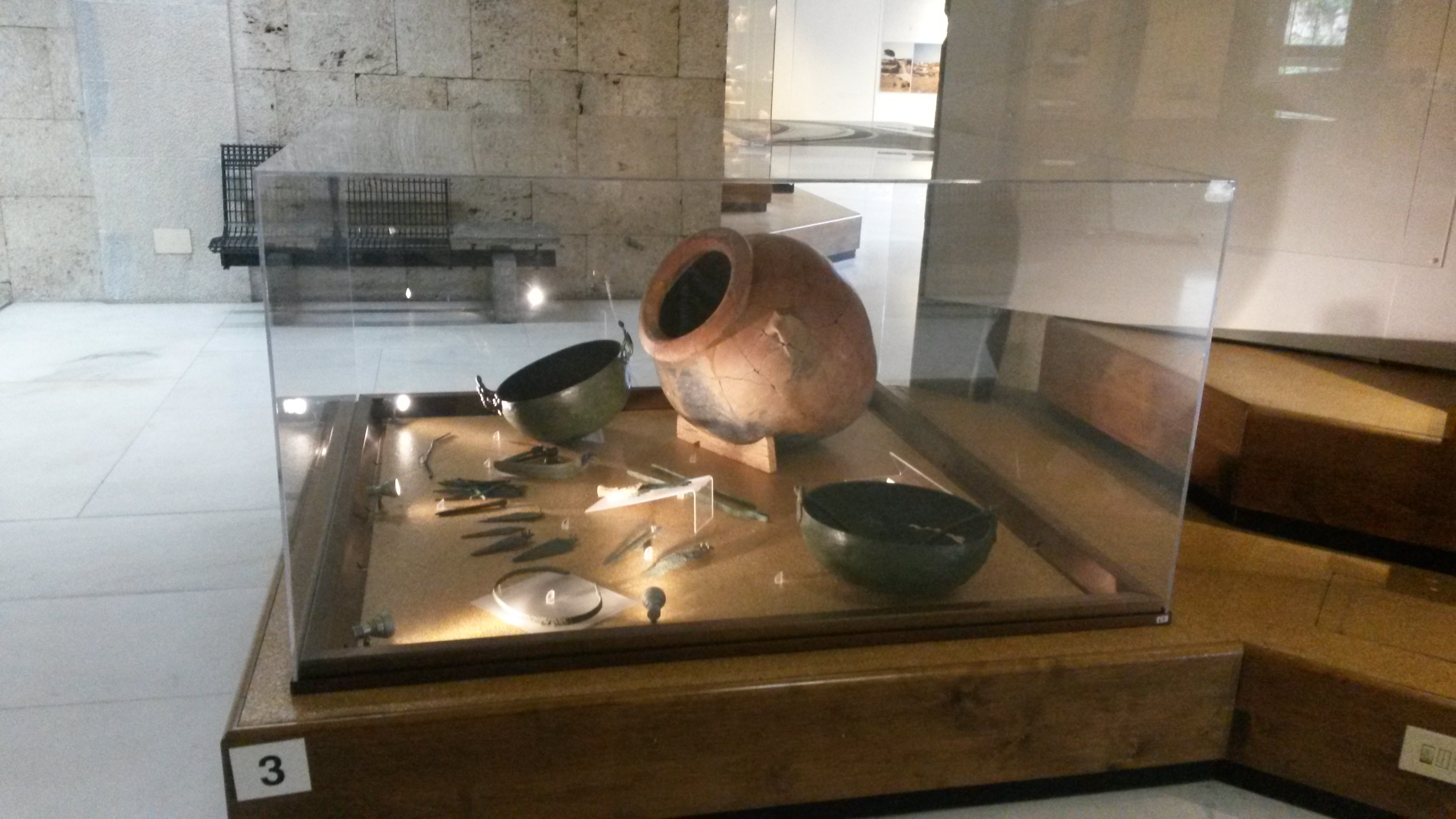
Finds from Santa Anastasia, Sardara

Plan of the first floor

The National Archaeological Museum of Cagliari (Italian: Museo Archeologico Nazionale di Cagliari) is a museum in Cagliari, Sardinia, Italy.

The museum houses findings from the pre-Nuragic and Nuragic age to the Byzantine age. These include a large collection of prehistoric bronze statuettes from the Nuragic age, some earlier stone statuettes of female divinities, reconstruction of a Phoenician settlement, the Nora Stone, Carthaginian goldsmith examples, Roman and Italic ceramics and Byzantine jewels.

The museum houses a valuable collection of wax anatomical models made in Florence by the sculptor Clemente Susini from dissections by the anatomist Francesco Antonio Boi between 1801 and 1805. The collection is housed in a pentagonal room. Preparation of the models was funded by Charles Felix (1765–1831), the younger brother of King Victor Emmanuel I of Sardinia (1759–1824), and the collection was originally held in his Museum of Natural History and Antiquities - these were transferred to the University of Cagliari in 1858, then to the museum in 1991.

The museum itself was formerly an armory. After falling into disrepair, the building was rebuilt by Italian architect Libero Cecchini.
