= Domenico Galeazzi =

Painter

Domenico Galeazzi (Bologna, 20 May 1647 – Bologna, 9 April 1731) was a painter from the Papal State.

== Biography ==
He was the son of Tommaso Galeazzi in Bologna. He trained under Carlo Cignani. He painted the main altarpiece for the church of Sant'Omobono. He also painted an altarpiece of St Francis in Prayer. He married Bianca Bulbarini of Reggio Emilia in 1682; she had nine children with him, among them Domenico Maria Gusmano Galeazzi, who became a doctor of philosophy and medicine. Domenico Maria Gusmano was the father of Lucia Galeazzi Galvani.

Domenico was buried in the church of the Madonna di Galliera, Bologna.
