= Francesco Antonio Boi =

Italian medical doctor and professor of anatomy

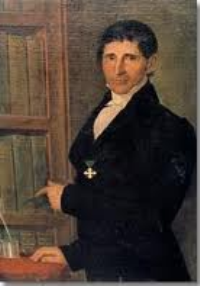
- Born: 1767; Olzai, Nuoro, Kingdom of Sardinia
- Died: May 15, 1859 (aged 91–92); Cagliari, Kingdom of Sardinia
- Occupation: Physician
- Known for: Anatomy

Francesco Antonio Boi (1767 – 15 May 1850) was a Sardinian medical doctor and professor of anatomy. He is known for his work with the sculptor Clemente Susini in preparing highly detailed and accurate wax anatomical models.

== Birth and education ==
Francesco Antonio Boi was born in Olzai, Nuoro, Sardinia in 1767, the son of a farmer. As a child he showed a high level of intelligence, and was sent to the Franciscans of Fonni in Sardinia to train for a career in the church. At the time, the church provided the only way in which someone from a poor family could obtain an education. He remained at the seminary until he was eighteen. He completed his studies in grammar, literature and philosophy, but then became interested in medicine and left the friars to attend the University of Cagliari. On 22 October 1795 he graduated as a doctor of medicine, and was given a teaching position in the university.

== Career ==
On 13 September 1796 Boi was appointed Associate Professor by royal decree, and on 16 March 1799 he was made Professor of Anatomy. Although the chair of anatomy had been founded in 1764, until Boi was appointed it had been filled by professors from other disciplines. Boi lectured at Cagliari for three years, but there were few students enrolled in the faculty. In 1801 he therefore asked for permission, which was granted, to visit other universities to continue his study of anatomy.

Boi first visited the University of Pavia, where the famous anatomist Antonio Scarpa (1752-1832) was the professor of anatomy, and then the University of Pisa before going on to Florence. There was no university in Florence, but there was a flourishing school of anatomy at the Hospital of Santa Maria Nuova under Paolo Mascagni (1755-1816), whose friend Felice Fontana (1730-1805) was the founder and director of La Specola Wax Museum. Charles Felix (1765-1831), the younger brother of King Victor Emmanuel I of Sardinia (1759-1824), financed Boi during his stay in Florence.

Boi began to study anatomy in Florence under Mascagni. He initially assumed his maternal name of Pirisi, but his skill and knowledge of anatomy soon became apparent, and he was forced to reveal himself. He began a close collaboration with Mascagni, with whom he formed a deep friendship. It was during these years that he worked with the sculptor Clemente Susini at La Specola in preparing wax anatomical models for teaching purposes. Charles Felix had commissioned Boi to help prepare the models, for which Boi undertook the dissections that Susini then reproduced in wax. Charles Felix purchased the wax models for his Museum of Natural History and Antiquities at considerable expense.

In 1805 Boi returned to Cagliari, where he resumed teaching, bringing the wax models with him. In 1818 he was appointed Minister of Health of the Kingdom of Sardinia, which included not just the island of Sardinia but also the territories of Liguria, Piedmont and Savoy. In 1824 he was knighted. On his retirement in 1844 he was made a professor emeritus of the faculty. He died in Cagliari on 15 May 1850.

== Work ==
Most of Boi's lectures have been lost, and none of his work was printed, so he is known now mainly by the high reputation he earned during his life and for the wax models that he helped to create. Some of Susini's most important works are held in Cagliari, and were based on dissection by Boi. They highlight the nerves and do not show lymphatics in the brain, correcting a mistake made in Susini's earlier waxes. They represent the convolutions of the human brain, and show the sympathetic and parasympathetic systems in accurate detail. It is clear that Susina and Boi worked closely together to ensure a high level of anatomical accuracy. The Cagliari models, with expressive faces and harmony of colors, are also considered artistic masterpieces.

The models were transferred to the anatomy department of the University of Cagliari in 1858. In 1963 they were placed on display in a room in the Institute of Anatomy. In 1991 they were transferred to the Museo archeologico nazionale in the Piazza Arsenale, where they are now on display in a pentagonal room.
