= Madonna del Baraccano, Bologna =

Catholic church in Bologna, Italy

Coordinates: 44°29′06″N 11°25′14″E

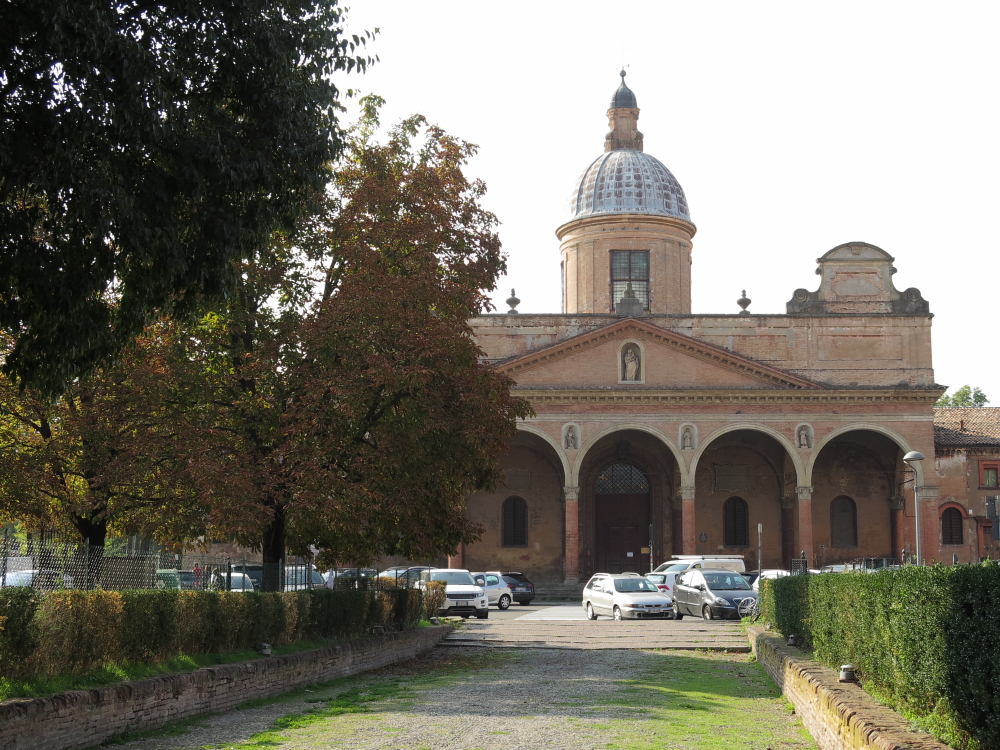
View of the church.

The Sanctuary of the Madonna del Baraccano is a Renaissance style, Roman Catholic church, located at Piazza del Baraccano 2 at the southern edge of the formerly walled central Bologna, region of Emilia-Romagna, Italy. The church was built at the site of city wall, where a Madonna image was painted, hence called Madonna of the Barricade. Presently much at the site is undergoing restoration after the May 2012 earthquake.

== History ==
In 1401, during a siege of Bologna by Gian Galeazzo Visconti, an elderly woman was spied kneeling in prayer next to the wall where a Madonna image was present. Suspecting she was voicing secrets through a small gap in the wall, she was arrested, and the town leader, Bente Bentivoglio had a wall built interior to the wall to seal the site. When that wall collapsed soon after construction, Bentivoglio interpreted this as a miracle, had the old woman freed. In 1438 an oratory had been built. By 1497, Giovanni Bentivoglio II had Francesco Cossa repaint the image, (original by Lippo di Dalmasio), and built a portico to shelter the image. In 1524, The church was built with its tympanum with a terracota virgin by Alfonso Lombardi. The porticoed forecourt was added in 1550, and the cupola was added in 1682 on a design by A. Barelli.

The interior has an altar to the right with a Procession of St Gregory Magnus by Cesare Aretusi and Giovanni Battista Fiorini. To the right of the main altar is the frescoed Enthroned Madonna with Angels (1472) by Francesco del Cossa. A silhouette of the praying woman can be seen. To the left of the altar is a Holy Family by Lavinia Fontana and a San Carlo Borromeo by Lucio Massari. In the next chapel is a Disputa of St Catherine (1551) by Prospero Fontana. There are also works of Federico Zuccari and Giovanni Marchesi.

Adjacent to the church there was a convent and hospice for prostitutes.
