= Jacopo Bartolomeo Beccari =

Italian chemist

Doctor of Medicine Jacopo Bartolomeo Beccari FRS
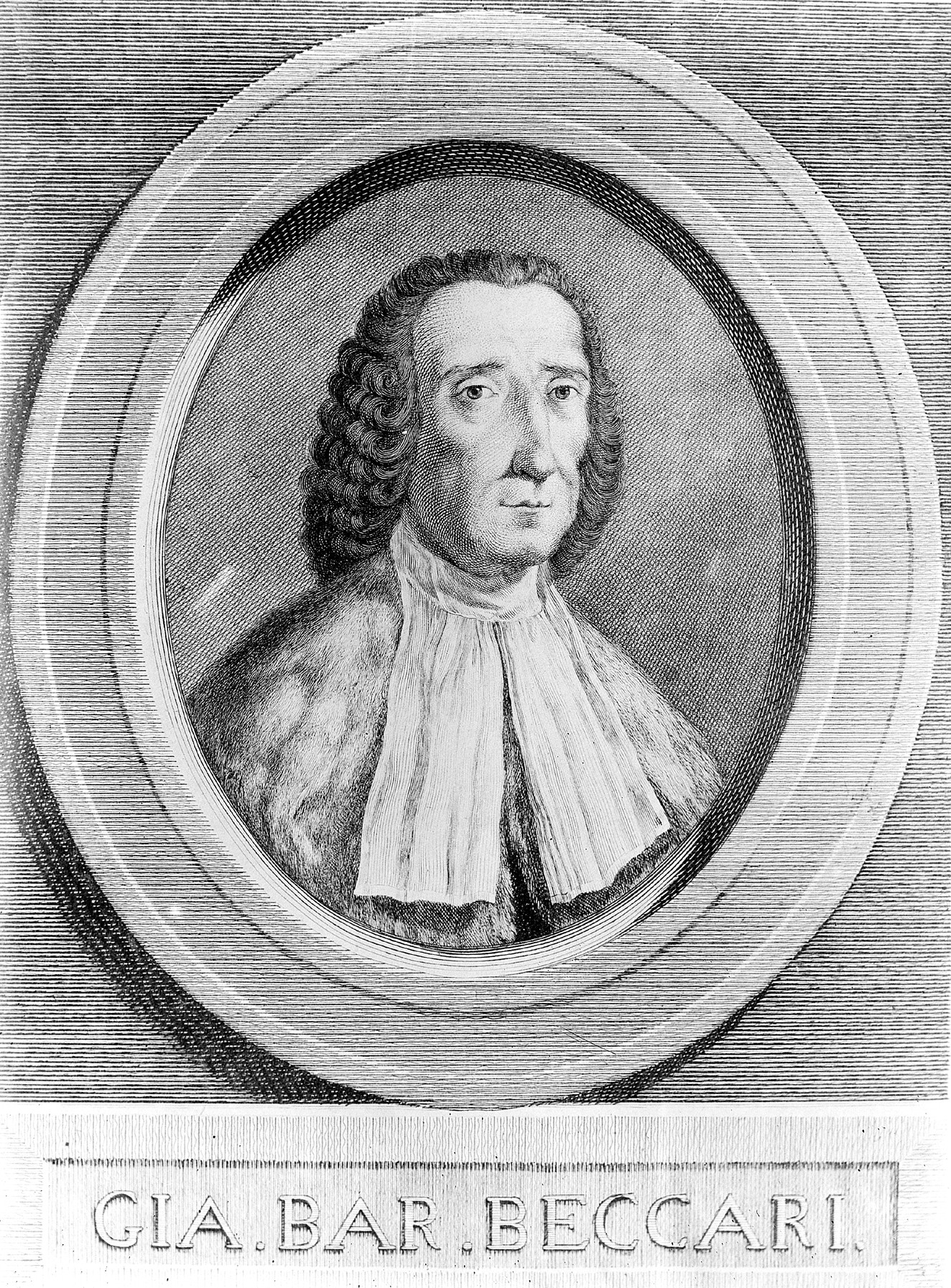
- Born: 25 July 1682; Bologna, Papal States
- Died: 18 January 1766 (aged 83); Bologna, Papal States
- Resting place: Madonna del Baraccano, Bologna
- Occupations: Chemist; Physician
- Known for: Discovery of gluten
- Parent(s): Romeo Beccari and Flaminia Vittoria Beccari (née Maccarini)

Academic background
- Education: University of Bologna
- Influences: Marcello Malpighi; Giovanni Battista Morgagni

Academic work
- Institutions: University of Bologna
- Notable students: Giovanni Battista Borsieri; Marco Carburi; Luigi Galvani

Jacopo Bartolomeo Beccari FRS (25 July 1682 – 18 January 1766) was an Italian chemist, one of the leading scientists in Bologna in the first half of the eighteenth century. He is mainly known as the discoverer of the gluten in wheat flour. Beccari was the first to give courses in chemistry at an Italian university. He is considered a forerunner of food science and bromatological chemistry.

== Life ==
=== Early life and education ===
Jacopo Bartolomeo Beccari was born in Bologna on 25 July 1682. After attending the Jesuit College, he graduated Doctor of Philosophy and Medicine at the University of Bologna in 1704. That same year he became member of the Accademia degli Inquieti created by Eustachio Manfredi in 1690. In 1712, he was appointed Professor of Theoretical Medicine at the University of Bologna.

=== Career ===
At the end of 1711, Luigi Ferdinando Marsili established the Institute and Academy of Sciences of the Institute of Bologna. Beccari was named head of the Natural Sciences Department and chair of Experimental Physics.

In 1724, Beccari was elected President of the Academy of Sciences of Bologna, a position took also in 1735, 1740 and 1750. In 1728, he was elected a Fellow of the Royal Society. In 1737, he was named Professor of Chemistry at the University of Bologna. One of his disciples was Luigi Galvani.

After 40 years of teaching, in 1749, Beccari was named Emeritus Professor. He died in Bologna on 18 January 1766, and was buried in the Sanctuary of the Madonna del Baraccano.

=== Scientific work ===
Besides teaching, he carried out a wide scientific activity, mainly in disciplines related to medicine, such as physiology, pathology and food science. He carried out important research on the phosphorescence of bodies, and studied the measurement of the intensity of the light emitted (De rebus aliisque adamant in phosphorum numerum referendis, 1745). In 1745, he discovered that silver salts are photosensitive, undergoing color change on exposure to light.

From his comments on foraminifera he is considered as one of the pioneers of microbiology. Beccari was also the first scientist to have ever described a microfossil species. His papers on fossil foraminifera provide evidence for the first micropaleontological analyses, including a deep investigation of the dominant species of the assemblage, and also a rigorous approach to the description of the materials, methods and interpretation.

Beccari is best known for the discovery of the gluten in wheat flour. In his article De frumento ("concerning corn or grain"), published in the Transactions of the Academy of Bologna in 1745, Beccari described the separation of flour into two components, "amylaceum" (starch), which was soluble in water and had properties similar to those of sugars, and "glutinosum," which was insoluble and sticky and resembled substances of animal origin.

Beccari also performed studies in other fields, such as hydrology, meteorology and physics. In recognition of his pioneering studies on micropaleontology, Linnaeus dedicated the most common and widespread species of his microscopic Nautilus (later Ammonia) to him.

== Works ==
- De Bononiensi arena quadam, in De Bononiensi scientiarum et artium Instituto atque Academia Commentarii, 1731, T. I, pp. 62–70;
- De Lapide Bononiensi, ibid., T. I., pp. 181–205;
- De motu intestino corporum fluidorum, ibid., T. I, pp. 483–496;
- Lettera al Cav. Tommaso Derham intorno la meteora chiamata "foco fatuo", in Saggio delle transazioni filosofiche della Società Regia dall'anno 1720 fino a tutto l'anno 1730, tradotta da T. Derham, Napoli 1734;
- Parere intorno al taglio della macchia di Viareggio, Lucca 1739;
- De juribus variis, in De Bononiensi scientiarum et artium Instituto atque Academia Commentarii, 1745, T. II, pp. 95–108;
- De corporum dissolutionibus, ibid., T. II, pp. 112–117;
- "De frumento". De Bononiensi scientiarum et artium instituto atque academia commentarii (PDF). Tomi secundi, Pars prima. 1745. pp. 122–127.
- De morbis quibusdam popularibus, ibid., T. II, pp. 219 s.;
- De longa cibi potusque omnis abstinentia, ibid., T. II, pp. 221–235;
- De luce dactylorum, ibid, T. II, pp. 248–273;
- De adamante aliisque rebus in phosphororum numerum referendis, ibid., T. II, pp. 274–303;
- De quamplurimis phosphoris nunc primum detectis commentarius, in De Bononiensi scientiarum et artium Instituto atque Academia Commentarii, 1747, T. II, pp. 136–179;
- De Bononiensi constitutione hyemali anni 1729/30 in Acta physico-medica Academiae Naturae Curiosorum, 1752, T. III, pp. 142–152;
- De qualitatibus quibusdam, quae phosphororum luci obstant, in De Bononiensi scientiarum et artium Instituto atque Academia Commentarii, 1755, T. III, pp. 105–113;
- De medicatis recobarii aquis, ibid., T- III, pp. 374–405;
- De vi, quam ipsa per se lux habet, non colores modo, sed etiam texturam rerum, salvis interdum coloribus, immutandi, in De Bononiensi scientiarum et artium Instituto atque Academia Commentarii, 1757, T. IV, pp. 74–87;
- De lacte, ibid., 1767, T. V, pp. 1–56;
- Consulta medica, Tipografia San Tommaso D'Aquino, Bologna 1777-1781, 3 voll.
