= Domenico Maria Gusmano Galeazzi =

Italian anatomist and professor of physics (1686-1775)

Domenico Gusmano Galeazzi (4 August 1686 -30 July 1775) was an Italian anatomist and professor of physics at the University of Bologna. He described the nature of urinary tract calculi.

Galeazzi (sometimes spelled Galeati) was born in Bologna, and there studied at the Jesuit College in Bologna and then studied medicine under Matteo Bazzani and Antonio Maria Valsalva.

Galeazzi obtained a doctorate in Philosophy and Medicine in 1709, and was appointed a substitute lecturer in experimental physics along with professor Jacopo Bartolomeo Beccari. In 1719, he travelled with Luigi Ferdinando Marsigli to the Alps of San Pellegrino to investigate the fossils of shells and weather. In 1728, he visited, with Marco Maria Melega, regions of Italy afflicted with a plague of locusts. In 1734, when Beccari became professor of chemistry, Galeazzi replaced him as professor of physics. One of Galeazzi's pupils was Luigi Galvani, who subsequently became his son-in-law when he married Domenico's daughter, Lucia Galeazzi.. Galeazzi was inducted into the Accademia Benedettina.
