= Giuseppe Ferrini =

Italian sculptor

Giuseppe Ferrini (fl. 18th century) was a Florentine model-maker.

He was commissioned by the Florentine surgeon and obstetrician Giuseppe Galletti (died 1819) to build a series of terracotta and wax obstetrical models for demonstrating different forms of childbirth to medical students, surgery students, and students at the School of Obstetrics. Ferrini worked in the renowned anatomical wax-modeling laboratory run by the abbot Felice Fontana (1730-1805). Grand Duke Peter Leopold (1747-1792) asked Fontana to set up the Museo di Fisica e di Storia Naturale of Florence.
