= Lucia Galeazzi Galvani =

Italian Medical scientist (1743–1788)

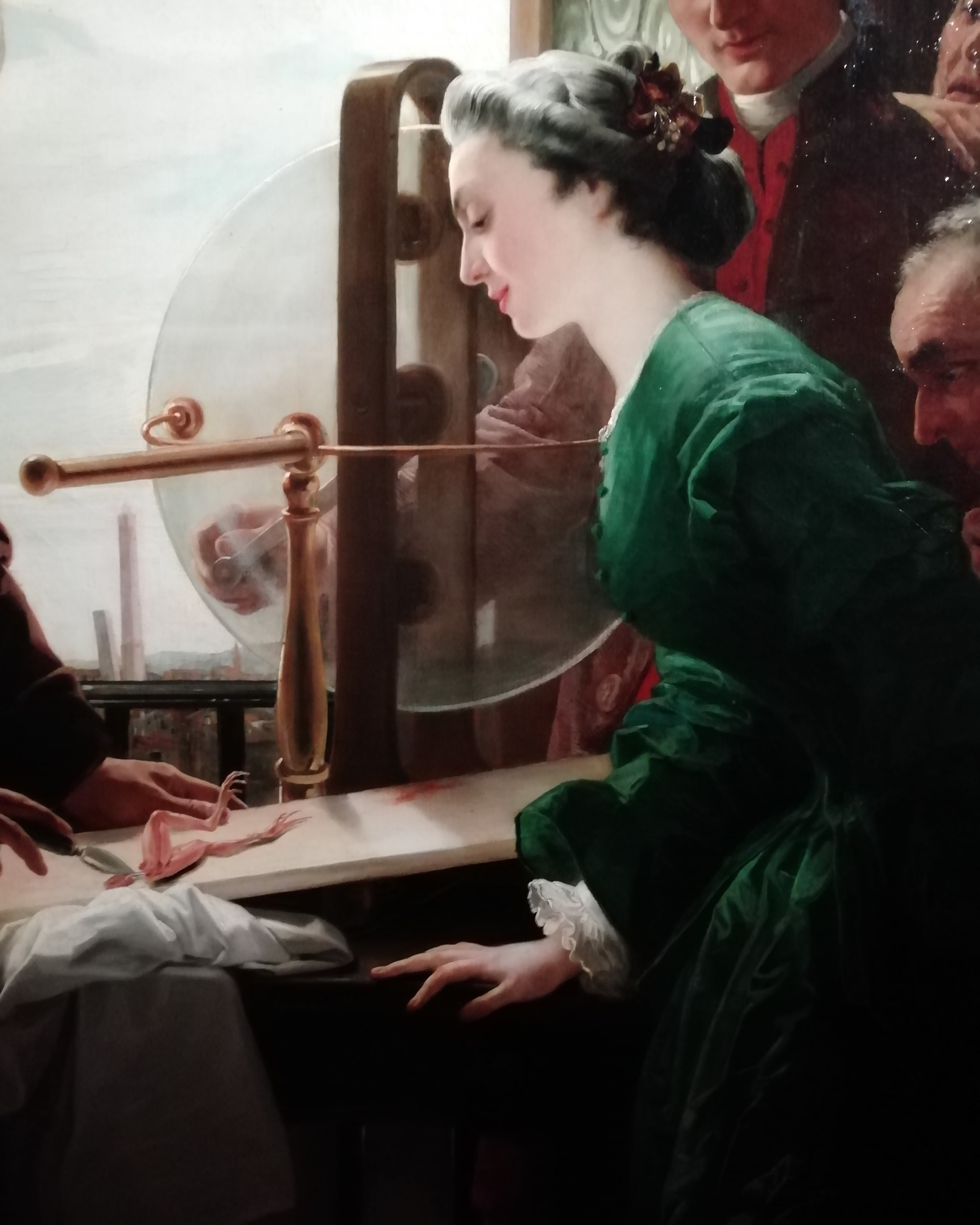
- Born: June 3, 1743; Bologna
- Died: June 30, 1790 (aged 47)
- Resting place: Corpus Domini, Bologna
- Spouse: Luigi Galvani (m. 1762)
- Father: Domenico Maria Gusmano Galeazzi

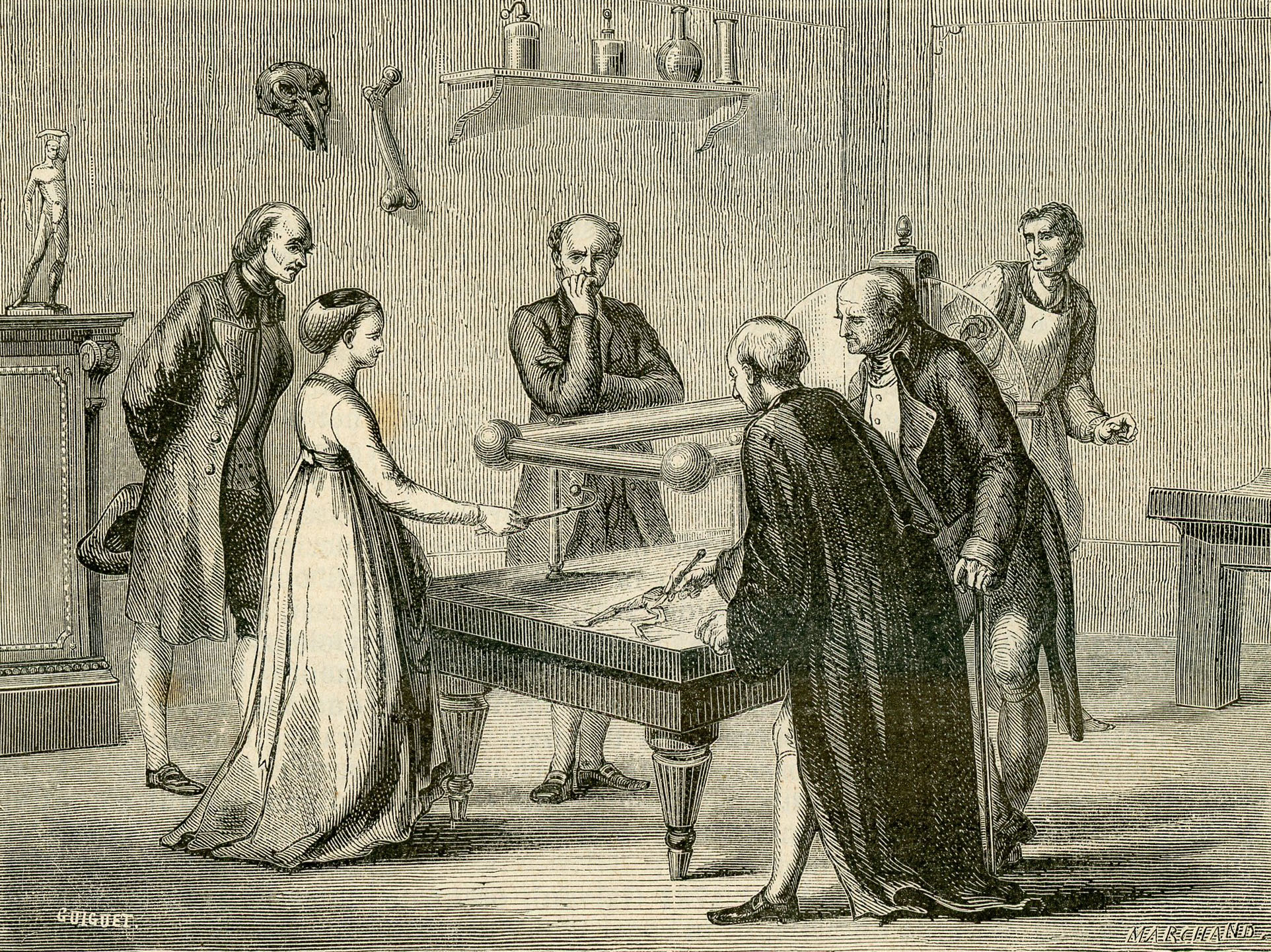
Experiments on the irritability of frog muscles with electricity in an 1886 woodcut for Galvani's centenary.

Lucia Galeazzi Galvani (3 June 1743, Bologna – 30 June 1790, Bologna) was an Italian scientist.

She was the daughter of anatomist Domenico Gusmano Galeazzi and Paola Mini, and granddaughter of the painter Domenico Galeazzi. In 1762, she married the doctor Luigi Galvani, a professor at the University of Bologna from 1775. In 1772, the couple moved to their own home at Galeazzi, where she and her spouse established a laboratory for the studies of the reflexes of the animal anatomy.

Galeazzi Galvani was actively engaged in the experiments; the couple also collaborated with Antonio Muzzi. She also was active as the medical assistant of her husband in his work as a surgeon and obstetrician. She additionally edited her husband's medical texts.

She died of asthma.

She encouraged and participated in her husband's independent research and served as a counsellor and research colleague for his experiments until her death. Due to the conventions of the time, she wasn't credited for any of her scientific work in the lab. She grew up with science, and her father was a prominent member of the Bologna Academy of Science.
