= Ricardo Galeazzi =

Italian orthopaedic surgeon

Professor Ricardo Galeazzi (1866 – 1952) was an Italian orthopaedic surgeon born in Turin, remembered for describing the Galeazzi fracture.

In 1886, he commenced his studies at Turin Medical School, graduating with honours in 1890.

In 1899, he became a qualified lecturer in Clinical Medicine and Surgical Operations and, in 1903, was appointed as the Director of the Pius Institute for Crippled Children (Instituto dei Rachitici).

He was the director of the orthopaedic clinic at the University of Milan for thirty-five years. He was known for his work on congenital hip dislocation, scoliosis, skeletal tuberculosis and juvenile osteochondritis, and contributed to the pathological understanding of osteitis fibrosa cystica and achondroplasia.

He described the fracture that bears his name in 1934, publishing his experience of 18 cases, although the injury pattern had been described previously by Sir Astley Cooper in 1842.

He also directed the Archivio di Ortopedia, the oldest journal devoted to orthopaedic surgery, for thirty five years.

The Galeazzi test is also named after him, which he developed following a review of more than 12,000 congenital hip dislocations.
