= Marcelo Galeazzi =

Argentine footballer

Marcelo Alejandro Galeazzi (29 November 1966 – 1 June 2016) was an Argentine former professional footballer who played as a defender for clubs of Argentina, Chile and Israel.

== Clubs ==
- Ferro Carril Oeste 1986–1987
- Atlanta 1987–1988
- Ferro Carril Oeste 1988
- Deportivo Español 1988–1989
- San Miguel 1990–1991
- Los Andes 1991–1992
- Racing Club 1992–1993
- Cobreloa 1993
- San Lorenzo 1993–1994
- Sportivo Italiano 1994–1995
- Tigre 1995–1996
- San Miguel 1996–1997
- Maccabi Kiryat Gat 1997

== Death ==
Galeazzi died of cardiac arrest on 1 June 2016.
