= Libero Cecchini =

Italian architect (1919–2020)

- Born: 28 September 1919; Pastrengo, Italy
- Died: 20 April 2020 (aged 100); Verona, Italy
- Occupation: Architect

Libero Cecchini (28 September 1919 – 20 April 2020) was an Italian architect. He specialised in the restoration of monuments and the design of residential complexes.

== Biography ==
Cecchini was born in Pastrengo into a family of stonemasons. He studied at an art school in Verona and received numerous awards for his sculptures in artistic exhibitions. He then studied at the Polytechnic University of Milan, and graduated in November 1944. He was registered as an architect in Verona and began restoring monuments damaged or destroyed during World War II. He worked for the Superintendent of Monuments in Verona until 1966, when he began committing himself to public projects, such as the Verona Chamber of Commerce, office buildings, schools, housing for the elderly, villas, and other commercial buildings.

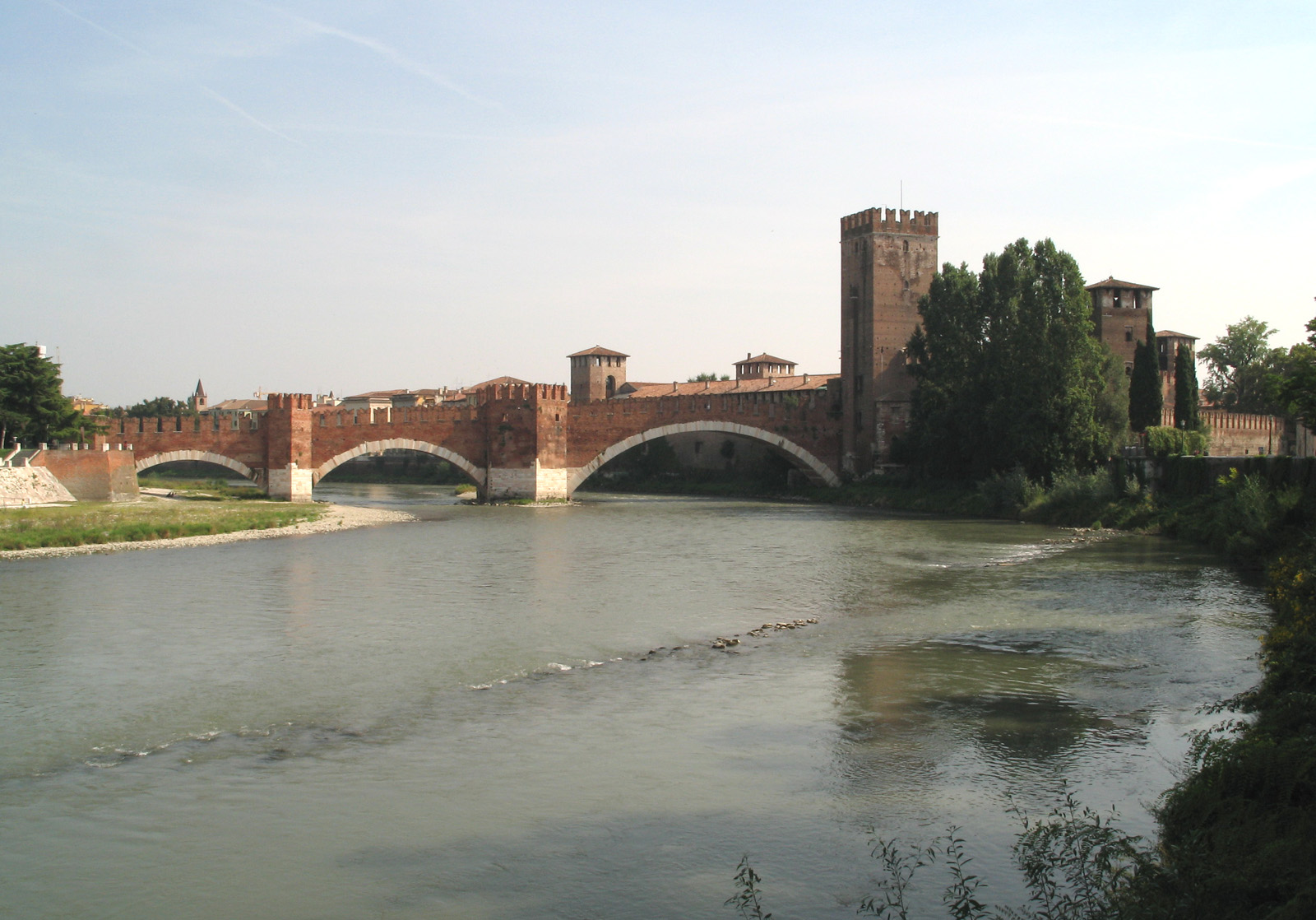
Castelvecchio Bridge, destroyed during World War II, was rebuilt with Cecchini as architect between 1949–1951.

In 1996, Cecchini and his son founded the company Vittorio Cecchini Libero and Associated Architects, which competed in numerous local and national architectural competitions.

== Awards ==
- Silver Medal for the Culture and the Arts of the Ministry of Education (1959)
- Second Prize at the “Premio Vitruve” International Competition in use of stone in architecture (1962)
- Regional “En-Arch” prize from Veneto, Trentino-Alto Adige and Friuli-Venezia Giulia for the INA-Casa San Dona di Trento project village (1964)
- Honorary Inspector of the General Directorate of Antiquities of Verona (1972)
- "Europa Nostra" Prize (1993)
- "Luigi Piccinato" Prize for Urban and Regional Planning (2005)

== Publications ==
- L'Abazia e il chiostro di S.Zeno Maggiore (1986)
- San Giorgio in Valpolicella - Scavi archeologici e sistemazioni museali (1988)
- La chiesa di S.Procolo in Verona - un recupero e una restituzione (1988)
- Natura e archeologia al fondamento dell'architettura (2009)
