= Valsalva =

Valsalva may refer to:

- Antonio Maria Valsalva, Italian anatomist (1666–1723)
- Valsalva device, an aid used in spacesuits to assist the wearer with the Valsalva maneuver
- Valsalva maneuver, a technique for equalising pressure in the middle ears
- Valsalva retinopathy, retinopathy caused by intrathoracic or intra-abdominal pressure
- Sinus of Valsalva, also known as the aortic sinus
