= Antonio Maria Valsalva =

Italian anatomist (1666–1723)

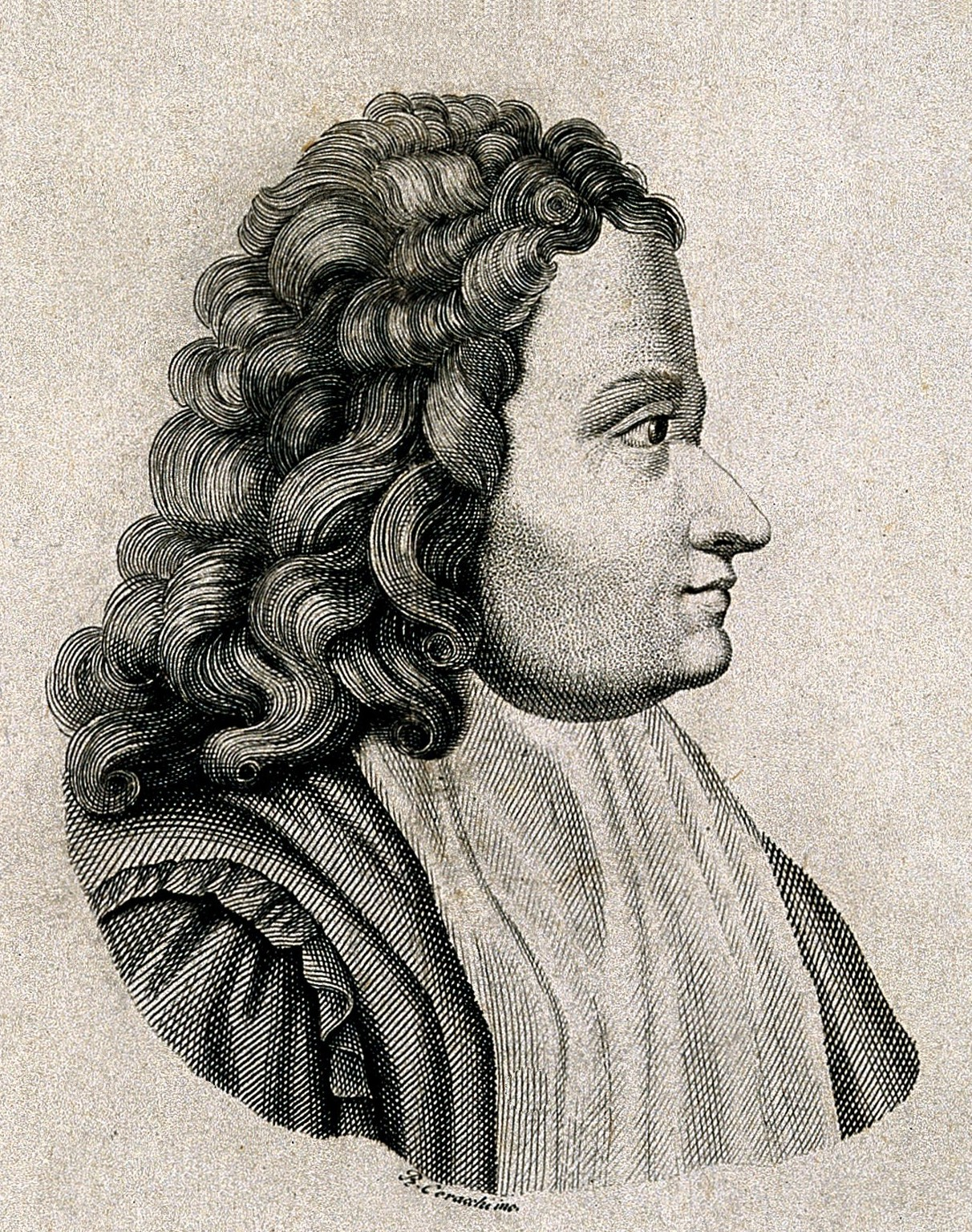
- Antonio Maria Valsalva
- Born: 17 January 1666; Imola, Papal States
- Died: 2 February 1723 (aged 57); Bologna, Papal States
- Known for: Valsalva maneuver
- Scientific career
- Fields: Anatomist
- Academic advisors: Marcello Malpighi
- Notable students: Giovanni Battista Morgagni

Antonio Maria Valsalva (17 January 1666 – 2 February 1723) was an Italian anatomist born in Imola. His research focused on the anatomy of the ears. He coined the term Eustachian tube and he described the aortic sinuses of Valsalva in his writings, published posthumously in 1740. His name is associated with the Valsalva antrum of the ear and the Valsalva maneuver, which is used as a test of circulatory function. Anatomical structures bearing his name are Valsalva’s muscle and taeniae Valsalvae. He observed that when weakness of one side of the body is caused by a lesion in the brain, the culprit lesion tends to be on the side opposite (contralateral) to the weak side; this finding is named the "Valsalva doctrine" in his honor.

== Background ==
Valsalva was born in Imola, which was then under the rule of the Pope. His initial studies were at a Jesuit school where he studied humanities, mathematics, and natural sciences. After studies of the liberal arts, he studied medicine and philosophy at the University of Bologna, where he trained under Marcello Malpighi, who was among the first to study microscopic anatomy. Valsalva graduated from medical school in 1687. In 1695, he was named surgeon for the Hospital of the Incurables (Sant"Orsola) in Bologna. In 1705, he was appointed professor of anatomy at the University of Bologna. He was later chosen as president of the Istituto Clementino delle Scienze ed Arti (Clementine Institute of Arts and Sciences). Valsalva taught Giovanni Battista Morgagni who edited Valsalva’s complete writings and published a biography on Valsalva, both in 1740.

In 1709, Valsalva married Elena Lisi. As he lost his health, he lost his sense of smell, but he recognized the prodromal symptoms, in the form of dyslalia, of the disease that would eventually cause his death from stroke at Bologna in 1723.

Valsalva was buried in the church of San Giovanni in Monte, Bologna. The Valsalva family donated a collection of dried anatomical specimens to be used for educational purposes to the Institute of Sciences founded in 1711. The wear of this material that followed possibly inspired the work of the Bolognese school of wax modeling and the artists Ercole Lelli and Giovanni and Anna Morandi Manzolini. This new anatomic collection includes models of the heart and lungs and is today presented at the Museum of Anatomy.

Valsalva was described as a skillful surgeon and excellent physician, a meticulous anatomist with high scientific integrity, and a man of great kindness. Morgagni wrote ". . . there is nobody of those times who goes ahead of him, very few who are his equals."

== Research ==
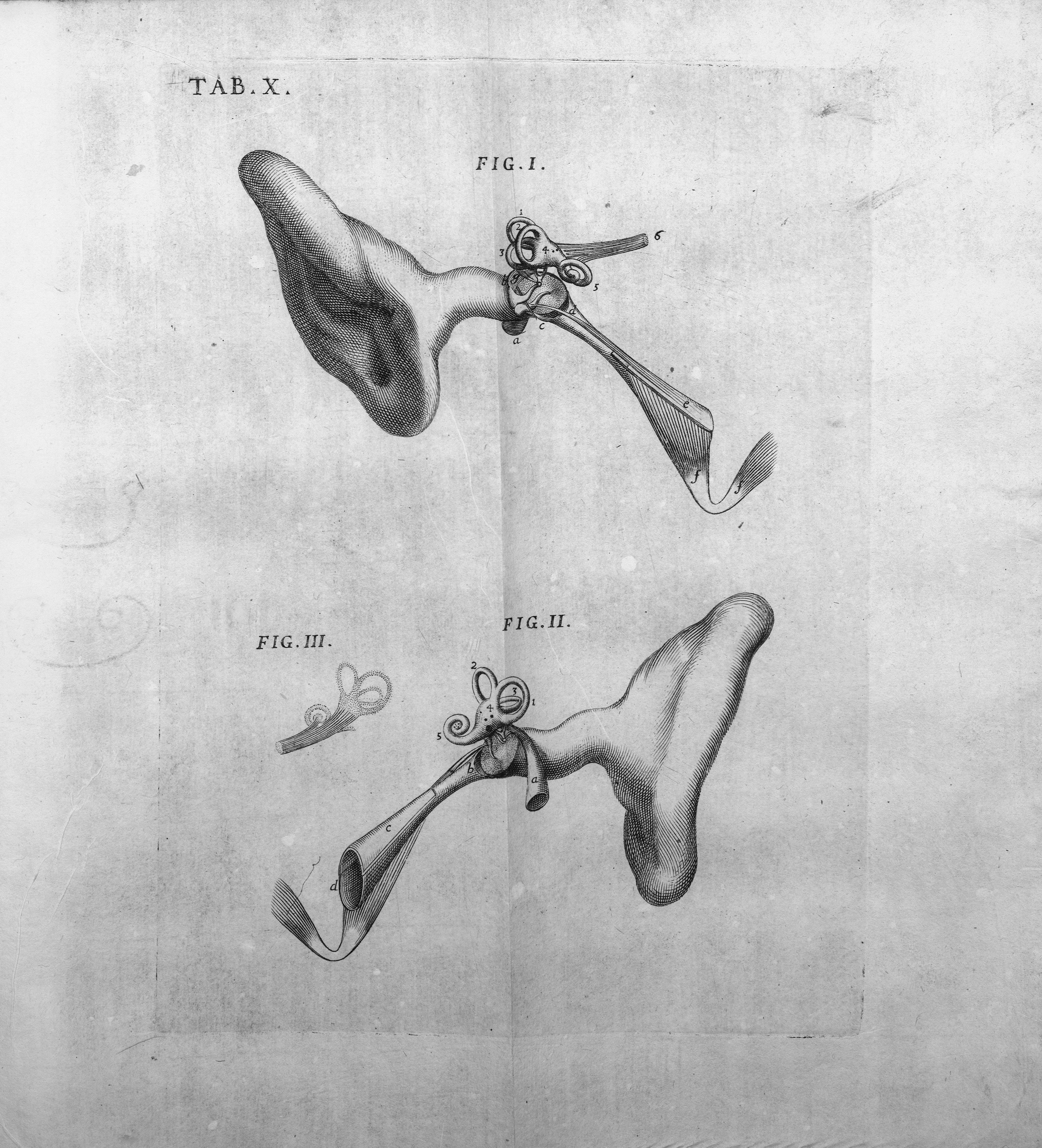
Opera, 1741

Valsalva both studied and taught in the fields of science, surgery, anatomy, physiology, and psychiatry. At a young age, Valsalva had successfully removed a dog’s kidney. He opposed cauterization in the treatment of wounds, and recommended humanitarian treatment of mentally ill patients. His main interest was the middle and internal ear, including the muscles of the external ear and the pharyngeal muscles.

Valsalva named the Eustachian tube and described its function and that of its muscle. He showed the connection between the mastoid cells and the tympanic cavity, and made observations on physiologic and pathologic processes of the ear. De aure humana tractatus published in 1704 contains a description of the Valsalva maneuver and patency test of the auditory tubes.

A skilled anatomist, Valsalva conducted many autopsies on deceased patients. During the 17th century, lacking chemical tests and knowledge of disease transmission mechanisms, he sometimes tasted the fluids he encountered in cadavers in an effort to better characterize them. "Gangrenous pus does not taste good", he wrote, "leaving the tongue tingling unpleasantly for the better part of the day."

=== Published works ===
- De aure humana tractatus (Treatise on the Human Ear, in quo integra auris fabrica, multis novis inventis & iconismis illustrata, describitur omniumque ejus partium usus indagantur: quibus interposita est musculorum uvulae, atque pharyngis nova descriptio et delineatio; by Antonio Maria Valsalva, Ludugni Batavorum, Gisbertum Langerak and Johannem Hasebroek (1735). (Translated into Italian by Vincenzo Mangano)

== Valsalva device in spacesuits ==
The Valsalva device is a device used in spacesuits to allow astronauts to equalize the pressure in their ears by performing the Valsalva maneuver inside the suit without using their hands to block their nose. It has also been used for other purposes, such as to remove moisture from the face.
