= Maria Dalle Donne =

Italian physician

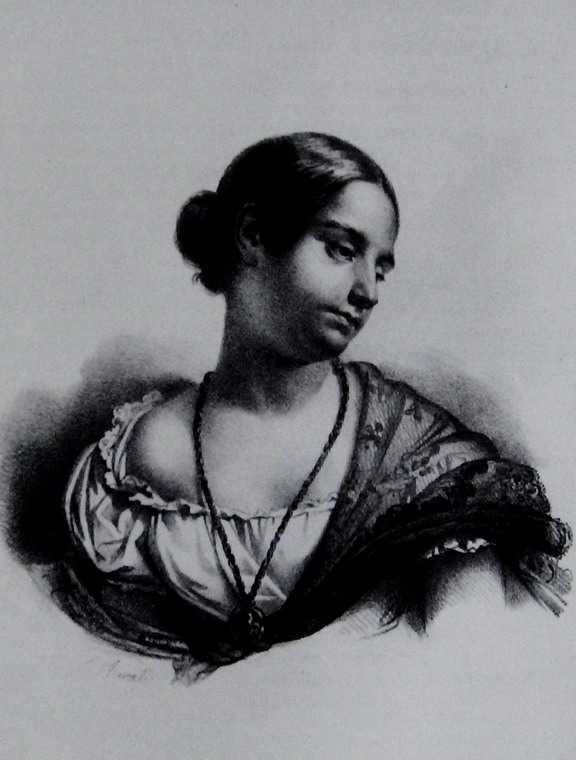
Maria Dalle Donne.

Maria Dalle Donne (12 July 1778 – 9 June 1842) was an Italian medical doctor and a director at the University of Bologna. She was the third woman in the history of the world to receive doctorate in medicine, and the second woman to become a member of the Ordine dei Benedettini Accademici Pensionati. She also ran a school of midwifery.

== Early life ==
Maria Nanni was born on 12 July 1778 in the Municipality of Loiano (Bologna), a village of 600 people perched on the Bolognese Apennines; her family had extremely humble origins, and it is believed that her parents were both farmers.

From an early age she suffered from a shoulder deformity that prevented her from undertaking physically difficult work; she was entrusted to the care of a paternal relative, Don Giacomo Dalle Donne, whose surname she would take as an adult. She was introduced to the study of Italian and Latin literature by the physician and botanist Luigi Rodati. Having recognised her intelligence in the field of science and humanities and by her speed in learning Greek and Latin, Rodati took care of her training, seeing in her a future Laura Bassi. He realised the extraordinary qualities of his pupils, as is testified by a letter sent in May 1789 to Canon Nicola Fabbri, his friend and scholar, in which it was written: "I have with me a Bolognese girl of eleven years old, who speaks and writes Latin and devotes herself to humanistic studies. One can place in her all the hopes of recovering Laura Bassi."

The young girl, moved by the ardent desire to learn, did not disappoint her teacher's expectations and made remarkable progress in her language studies. When Rodati was appointed professor of pathology and forensic medicine at the University of Bologna (1792), he took his pupil with him and entrusted her to the best teachers so that they could instruct her in the subject of philosophy and surgical medicine. Next, with the mathematician Sebastiano Canterzani she followed lessons in philosophy and then physics with Giovanni Aldini, anatomy and pathology with Gaetano Uttini but above all obstetrical surgery with Tarsizio Riviera. The excitement of having among the Bolognese ranks a young woman of such talent as Laura Bassi was so strong that Riviera directed the young Dalle Donne towards the study of obstetrics and urged her to take a degree in medicine and philosophy, in accordance with the custom of the time, both in recognition of knowledge and so that she could provide for herself as a doctor.

== Education ==
On August 1, 1799 Maria sustained in the Church of S. Domenico a public dispute that lasted three days on the theme "De Integumentis", whose success induced her to deepen all the branches of medicine and surgery until, urged by her teachers and in particular by Riviera, she asked to sustain a further dispute in order to obtain the doctoral degree. On December 19, 1799 she was examined in the anatomical theatre of the Archiginnasio with a large audience in order to obtain a degree and a title of Doctor in medicine and philosophy. Four hours before the discussion, she was presented with two theses to be masterfully commented, taken from a text by Aristotle and an aphorism by Hippocrates, which she would have to defend in a public dispute. Accompanied not by her teachers but by Clotilde Tambroni, philologist and Greek scholar and the only professor of Greek language and literature at the University of Bologna, Maria enraptured the entire college with her mastery of the subject, her eloquence in Latin and her confidence.

She discussed various topics such as surgery, dietetics, pharmaceutics, but one field in which she displayed a particularly keen interest - and which later became her occupation - was obstetrics and the care of the newborn. She presented topics that were poorly understood at the time, such as placental circulation and metal malformations, and began to lay the foundations of modern neonatology. The degree, at the age of 21 years, was awarded by acclamation and to deliver it was his teacher Riviera who decorated her with the insignia doctoral: the laurel wreath, the doctoral ring and books, symbol of glory, dignity and wisdom, thus becoming the first woman to graduate in medicine in the University of Bologna and to receive permission to practice medicine freely.

== Career ==
Subsequently, Maria decided to embark on the path to becoming a licensed teacher. In the Church of San Domenico, during May 23–24, 1800 Maria sustained three theses of a historical-medical nature on the function of the various organs and on the various therapeutic methods, standing up for three days to doctors and philosophers, strong in her scientific preparation. In the first thesis, "Ex Anatomia et Physiologia", she analyzes the structure and function of the different organs and apparatuses, comparing the theories of the past with those widespread in her time. It also constitutes a bibliographic review on female fertility, fetal malformations and blood circulation in the uterus. This paper reflected the gap between the considerable progress already made in the field of anatomy and the less significant progress achieved in physiology. With regard to certain topics such as fertilisation, placental circulation and fetal malformations, Dalle Donne expounded personal opinions that refer to the thought of her teacher Tarsizio Riviera.

The second dissertation, entitled "Theses ex Universa Medicina", is a rapid and exhaustive excursus on the various therapies then in use. Considerable importance is attributed by Maria Dalle Donne to the rules of hygiene, which together are called dietetic medicine. Observing the rules of hygiene makes life healthier and ensures that recourse to surgical or pharmacological therapy is limited. The chapter on surgery provides information about the interventions practiced at the end of the eighteenth century and they probability of success; for example, operations on the viscera were impossible because of the lack of anaesthesia and asepsis. The work also includes a section dedicated to medical therapy in which Maria Dalle Donne affirms that, for a correct and efficient therapy, a good diagnosis is fundamental. Lastly, two interesting aspects are: nosology, which is based mainly on the set of symptoms rather than on aetiology, and the exposition of the most used therapeutic substances, such as cinchona, mercury, iron and opium.

The third dissertation, which focused on obstetrics and the diseases of newborns, has been lost, probably due to the bombing of the Archiginnasio Palace in January 1944. However, this dissertation was undoubtedly edited, and this is confirmed by a commemoration written in 1941, from which we learn that, after having dealt with a number of obstetrical topics, in the last chapter Dalle Donne speaks about the care of the newborn, also providing practical advice that differs from the ideas of the time, such as that of banning the use of swaddling clothes. In general, the focus of the three theses was on female health during gestation, on the circulation of blood in the uterus and, obviously, obstetrics. On May 29, at the Archiginnasio, she faced a third dissertation, now lost, on themes inherent more specifically to obstetrics, in order to obtain a medical reading assignment at the university. In favour of her merits, on May 31, 1800 Maria was enrolled at the Accademia dei Benedettini of the Institute of Sciences and thus obtained the qualification, as had been conferred to Laura Bassi in 1745.

== Writings ==
- "Theses ex Universa Medicina depromptae quas defendendas proponiert", 1800
- "Et Medicinae Doctrix Bononiensis Academiae Scientiarum Instituti socia", 1800
- "Theses ex Anatomia et Physiologia Depromptae", 1800

== The School of Midwifery ==
In those years, at the time of the French occupation, a greater interest in the care of pregnant women and the education of midwives was emerging, and the level of preparation of midwives had improved considerably since 1757, the year in which the Bolognese Institute of Sciences of the first Italian School of Obstetrics directed by Giovanni Antonio Galli was founded. In 1801 Riviera himself sent a report to the Inspector of Studies in which he proposed the creation of a place, similar to a hospital, where "poor pregnant women about to give birth" could be taken care of. The Napoleonic government decided to open a School of Obstetrics for midwives, on the model of the one operating at the Hospital of St. Catherine in Milan. Unfortunately, the start-up of the school encountered significant difficulties due to the difficult task of finding a suitable location and the funds necessary for its management. As a consequence, the government in March 1805 gave the doctor the faculty to hold the courses at her home. Everything remained unchanged at least until 1829, the year in which the parish priest of S. Maria Maddalena, citing the readers of the University of Bologna, wrote that Dr. Maria Dalle Donne gave "privately at home lessons in obstetrics to mothers with special government authorization". The chronicles of the time describe her as a strict and severe teacher, but at the same time a mother who was tender towards her students, who were, however, carefully assessed as the doctor was extremely circumspect when expressing her judgement. Maria considered creepy the widespread use of entrusting in the hands of rough and inexperienced women, only eager for money, the life of two people and therefore during her lessons she did not spare attention, time, care and study. Although she knew Latin and Greek, she often used familiar expressions typical of the Bolognese dialect because she did not want to be admired but understood. The students, usually from neighboring towns but also from Ravenna or Rimini, were married women or widows because their work was considered unsuitable for unmarried women, who would have come into contact with situations that according to the morals of the time offended public decency (illegitimate pregnancies, requests for verification of virginity or attempted abortion).

=== The rules of the school ===
For several years the school did not have its own regulations and the aspiring student had to present only a certificate of good political and moral conduct issued by the authority of the place of residence as well as a document attesting to the practice with a surgeon. The greatest difficulty for the female students was admission, since Maria was very strict in the selection process and demanded application and dedication. Generally, the course lasted one year and was attended by women coming from the Bologna area and, in some cases, from other provinces: the first six months were exclusively theoretical and only afterwards could the practice begin, assisted by an expert public midwife. At the end of the course, and only after passing the exam, the student was granted the right to practice the profession. Following the Papal Restoration, the parish priest had to declare that the student was a woman of good morals and that she was also able to administer baptism in urgent cases. In addition, the free exercise of the profession of midwife had to be authorized by the archiepiscopal curia and periodically submitted to the control of the parish priests. The awarding of the diploma was conditional on compulsory attendance at the courses but, very often, this obligation was not fulfilled, especially by midwives from the countryside, who had difficulty travelling and did not have sufficient means to meet the expenses. On the whole, the course made a fundamental contribution to improving the care of women in labor and became increasingly popular thanks to Maria Dalle Donne. If it happened that any of her deserving students found themselves in difficulty, Maria paid all her expenses so that they could continue their studies, as happened to her. Strict with everyone, she didn't promote anyone if they didn't deserve it, in order to prevent avoidable deaths in infancy with the help of a good midwife. According to the memoirs of some of her students, she was very strict and rigorous when she had to train midwives who would work in the countryside and in isolated areas, aware of the lack of hospital support. Except for a few brief interruptions due to political changes, Maria Dalle Donne was in charge of the school and teaching for thirty-seven years, from the beginning of the courses in 1805 until 1842.

== Death and legacy ==
Maria Dalle Donne carried on teaching until her death, on 9 January 1842 in her home in Via Saragozza nº147, when she was suddenly struck by syncope. On 13 January she was buried in the Monumental Cemetery of the Certosa di Bologna. Her epigraph on the tombstone of the Certosa of Bologna reads: "woman of great learning - illustrious for every kind of virtue - doctor of philosophy and medicine". Just as Laura Bassi was a reference point for her, Maria Dalle Donne became, over time, an example of a doctor and teacher. "The tomb of Maria, daughter of Carlo Dalle Donne, a woman of great learning, illustrious for every kind of virtue, doctor of philosophy and medicine, enrolled, as a sign of honor, among the members of the Benedictine Academy. Pious, amiable, chastened, she was familiar with scientists. She was very dear to her family, very dear to everyone."

In 1964 Edmea Pirami remembered her at the Medical-Surgical Society of Bologna: "We, women physicians of today, recognize in her vocation the same vocation as ours. To us, this lady doctor of the very early 19th century appears as the forerunner of our professional life today. In her we see, once again, how the humility of her origins does not impede the ascent of those who use their talents with discipline and good will. In her, finally, we admire the complete dedication to medicine."

== Acknowledgements ==
To Maria Dalle Donne were dedicated:

- The "Maria Dalle Donne" State Middle School in Monghidoro (BO)
- Maria Dalle Donne" Secondary School in Loiano (BO)
- At the entrance to the Town Hall in Loiano it is possible to admire a bronze bust of Dr. Dalle Donne created by the sculptor Carlo Anleri. The small monument is accompanied by a panel in which Giovanna Gironi tells the story of this extraordinary woman.
- At the entrance to the Municipality of Loiano, the Bolognese sculptor (and honorary citizen of Loiano) Luigi Enzo Mattei has inserted the effigy of Maria Dalle Donne among the characters featured in his monumental terracotta work entitled "La Parete dei Viaggiatori".

== Bibliography ==
- L. Bernardini, «Maria Nanni Dalle Donne: La Laura Bassi Dell'Appennino». Nellevalli Magazine, 20 Jan. 2020, www.nellevalli.it
- P. Berti Logan, Women and the Practice and Teaching of Medicine in Bologna in the Eighteenth and early Nineteenth Century, «Bulletin of the History of Medicine», 77 3 (2003), pp. 507–535
- C. Bonafede, Cenni biografici e ritratti di insigni donne bolognesi raccolti dagli storici più accreditati, Bologna, Tipografia Sassi nelle Spaderie, 1845
- L. Burgatti, Maria Dalle Donne (1778-1842), Loiano, 1971, p. 3-9
- R. Buriani, Necrologio della Dottoressa Anna Maria Delle Donne, «Almanacco statistico bolognese per l'anno 1842 dedicato alle donne gentili», Bologna, Tip. Natale Salvardi,1842, pp. 125–132
- M. Ogilvie, J. Harvey (a cura di), The biographical dictionary of women in science. Pioneering lives from ancient times to the mid-20th century, New York-London, Routledge, 2000, p. 323
- M. Palumbo, and E. Calzolari. “Maria Dalle Donne Nel Secondo Centenario della sua nomina nel 1804 a direttrice della scuola per Levatrici di Bologna.” History of Medicine- Medicina Nei Secoli, vol. 17, ser. 1, 17 Jan. 2005, pp. 205–219. 1.
- F. Patuelli Dalle Donne Maria - Scienza a Due Voci. «Dalle Donne Maria», Scienza a Due Voci (UniBo), scienzaa2voci.unibo.it
- E. Pirami, Rievocazione della dottoressa in medicina Maria Dalle Donne, «Bollettino delle scienze mediche», a. 136, fasc. 1, Bologna, 1964, pp. 69–76
- E. Piramiemiliani, « Rievocazione di una “donna medico” bolognese del primo ottocento: Maria Dalle Donne (Recollection of a “woman Physician” of Bologna of the early 19th century: Maria Dalle Donne)». Bull Sci Med (Bologna). 1964 Jan-Mar;136:69-76. Italian. PMID 14127339.
- O. Sanlorenzo, Maria Dalle Donne e la Scuola di ostetricia nel secolo XIX, in Alma mater studiorum. «La presenza femminile dal XVIII al XX secolo», Bologna, Clueb, 1988
