= Giovanni Antonio Galli =

Giovanni Antonio Galli may refer to:

- Giovanni Antonio Galli (physician)
- Giovanni Antonio Galli (artist)

== See also ==
- Giovanni Galli, Italian footballer
