= Royal Academy of Sciences =

Royal Academy of Sciences may refer to:

- French Academy of Sciences
- Royal Academy of Sciences of Bologna
- Spanish Royal Academy of Sciences
- Swedish Royal Academy of Sciences
- Royal Academy of Sciences of Lisbon, now the Sciences Academy of Lisbon

== See also ==
- Royal Academy
