= Giovanni Antonio Galli (physician) =

18th century physician

- Born: 1708
- Died: 1782 (aged 73–74)
- Occupation: Surgeon
- Known for: Obstetrics teaching methods

Giovanni Antonio Galli (1708–1782) was a physician who pioneered the teaching of obstetrics in Bologna using three-dimensional models.

Giovanni Antonio Galli was born in 1708. He was appointed a Professor in the School of Surgery of the University of Bologna. Galli opened a school on obstetrics in his house. He encouraged Anna Morandi Manzolini, wife and assistant of the wax anatomical modeler Giovanni Manzolini, to give private lectures on anatomy. She had learned from her husband and from her own experience in dissection, and gained a European reputation. Anna Morandi was widowed in 1755. Soon after, she was appointed Professor of Anatomy at the Academy of Sciences of Bologna Institute.

In 1757 Galli was made Professor of Obstetrics at the Bologna Institute in the Palazzo Poggi, and the next year Pope Benedict XIV overrode opposition and established a school of obstetrics at the Institute. The Pope acquired Galli's collection of teaching models for use in the Institute's school. Galli's first twenty models were made by the Manzolinis, and eventually the institute would have over 150 obstetrical models. Galli invented a machine to simulate the birthing process for teaching medical students and midwives. Galli's school was unusual in combining theory and practice in his teaching method, and at that time unusual in teaching the subject in a medical and surgical school. He died in 1782.
