= Handgrip maneuver =

Performed by clenching one's fist forcefully for a sustained time until fatigued

The handgrip maneuver is performed by clenching one's fist forcefully for a sustained time until fatigued. Variations include squeezing an item such as a rolled up washcloth.

== Physiological response ==
The handgrip maneuver increases afterload by squeezing the arterioles and increasing total peripheral resistance.

== Cardiology ==
Since increasing afterload will prevent blood from flowing in a normal forward path, it will increase any murmurs that are due to backwards flowing blood. This includes aortic regurgitation (AR), mitral regurgitation (MR), and a ventricular septal defect (VSD).

Mitral valve prolapse: The click and the murmur of mitral valve prolapse are delayed because left atrial volume also increases due to mitral regurgitation along with increased left ventricular volume.

Murmurs that are due to forward flowing of blood such as aortic stenosis, and hypertrophic cardiomyopathy decrease in intensity.

The effect of reducing the intensity in forward flowing murmurs is much more evident in aortic stenosis rather than mitral stenosis. The reason for this is that there is a larger pressure gradient across the aortic valve. A complementary maneuver for differentiating disorders is the Valsalva maneuver, which decreases preload.

Handgripping maneuver	Cardiac Finding
Increased murmur intensity	Aortic regurgitation
Increased murmur intensity	Mitral regurgitation
Increased murmur intensity	Ventricular septal defect
Decreased murmur intensity	Aortic stenosis
Decreased murmur intensity	Hypertrophic cardiomyopathy

== See also ==
- Valsalva maneuver
- Preload
- Afterload
