= Filippo Maria Monti =

Cardinal Filippo Maria Monti
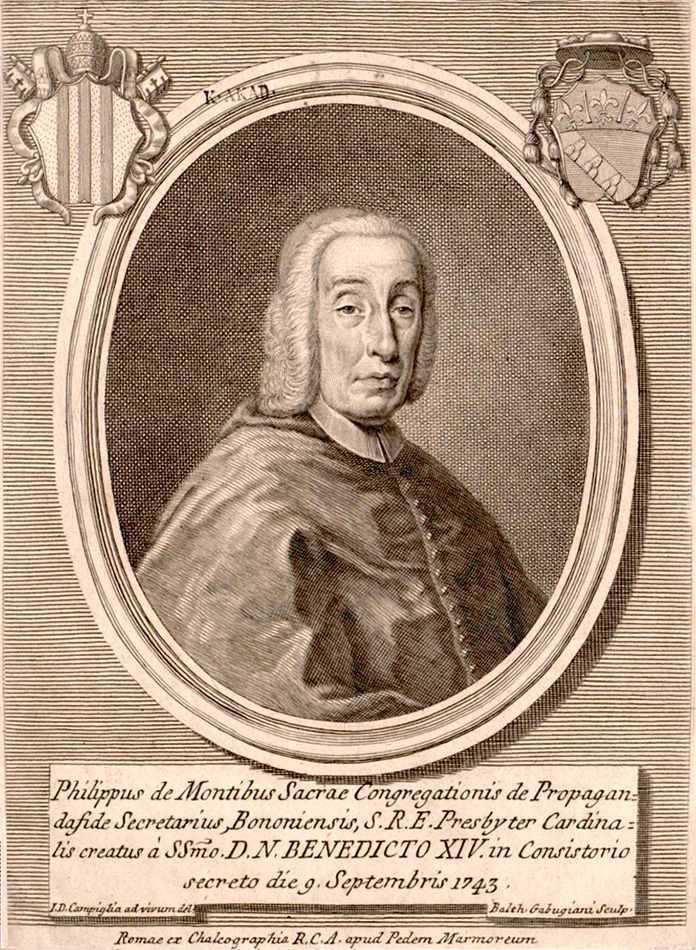
- Appointed: 9 September 1743
- Term ended: 17 January 1754

Personal details
- Born: 23 March 1675
- Died: 17 January 1754 (aged 78)
- Denomination: Roman Catholic
- Occupation: Priest

Filippo Maria Monti (or Cardinal de Monti) (23 March 1675 – 17 January 1754) was a Cardinal in the Catholic Church, elevated by Pope Benedict XIV on 9 September 1743. After his death, his large library became the nucleus of the library of the Academy of Sciences of Bologna Institute, later transferred to the University of Bologna.

== Early years ==
Filippo Maria Monti was born in Bologna on 23 March 1675, son of Ferdinando Monti and Camilla Moscardini. His father was of mercantile origins, but had obtained the title of Marquis. In 1719, Filippo's brother Francesco was made a Senator of Bologna. Filippo attended the "El Porto" college for nobility, then studied the law before going to Rome in the service of Cardinal Enrico Noris. In 1709, he was dispatched to Venice by Pope Clement XI to iron out causes of tension with that state caused by the War of the Spanish Succession (1701–1714), particularly the Imperial occupation of the Papal possession of Comacchio.

== Priest and Cardinal ==
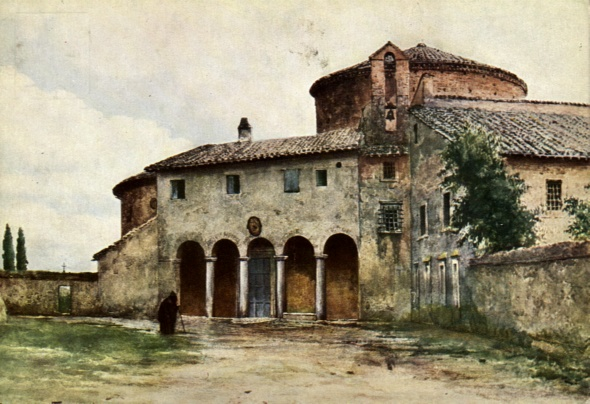
Santo Stefano Rotondo in a 19th-century painting by Ettore Roesler Franz

Monti was made a domestic priest in 1710, and in 1715 was made a canon of the Basilica di Santa Maria Maggiore and was ordained a priest. In 1730, he was named Secretary of the consistorial Congregation, and on 18 February 1736, was promoted to Secretary of Propaganda Fide. He was elevated to Cardinal on 9 September 1743 in the Consistory of 1743, installed Cardinal-Priest of Sant'Agnese fuori le mura on 23 September 1743, and appointed Cardinal-Priest of Santo Stefano Rotondo on 10 April 1747. He died on 17 January 1754.

== Collection ==
Monti began to collect books in the 1720s, some on religious or historical subjects but including many modern literary and scientific works. By the time of his death, his library contained 11,000 volumes, mostly printed, including texts on theology, philosophy, canon law and literature. In accordance with the Pope's suggestion, Cardinal Monti bequeathed his entire library to the Academy of Sciences of Bologna Institute. He also gave the Institute a collection of 400 paintings which included portraits of major scientific figures. The library was formally opened in 1756.
