= Giovanni Manzolini =

Italian sculptor

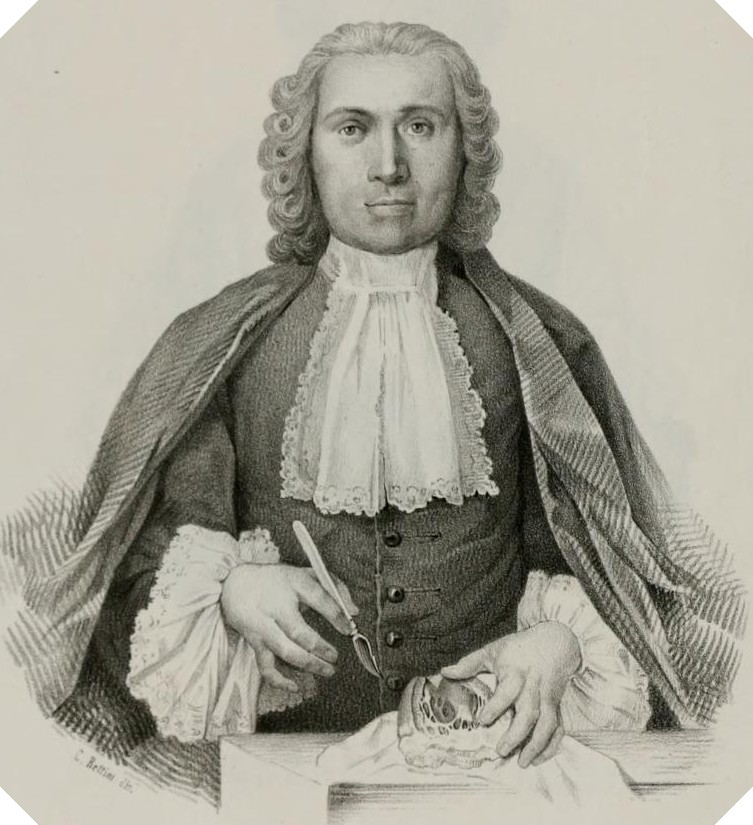
- Born: 1700; Bologna
- Died: 1755 (aged 54–55); Bologna
- Occupation: Sculptor
- Known for: Anatomical models

Giovanni Manzolini (1700-1755) was a Bolognese artist, an expert maker of wax anatomical models and a professor of anatomy at the University of Bologna. His wife Anna Morandi Manzolini also became a well-known maker of wax anatomical models.

== Early years ==
Giovanni Manzolini was born in 1700 in Bologna, the son of a shoemaker. As a young man he helped his father in his trade. In 1736 he married Anna Morandi (1716-1774), whom he had known since childhood. His wife had been trained as an artist. They were to have six children before 1755, although four died before reaching adulthood.

== Wax modeler and anatomist ==
Deciding to become a figure painter, Manzolini joined Ercole Lelli's studio at the age of 40 to learn the art of anatomical sculpture. He was made Lelli's assistant in 1743. Under Lelli, Manzolini was made chief assistant on the papal commission to make wax models for the Anatomy Museum of the Academy of Sciences of Bologna Institute, holding this position for three years. He resigned in late 1746. He felt bitterly that Lelli had deprived him of recognition for his greater knowledge of anatomy and anatomical sculpture.

After leaving Lelli, Manzolini opened his own studio for wax modeling and launched a school of anatomy. His wife also learned how to dissect cadavers, and learned anatomy and the art of wax modeling so she could help her husband. The husband and wife team became recognized by artists and anatomists throughout Europe. Anna Moranda was the one who gave the lectures and demonstrations at the school. Manzolini was appointed Professor of Anatomy at the University of Bologna.

Giovanni Manzolini died in Bologna in 1755. Anna Morandi Manzolini had been helping her husband with lectures, and after his death was appointed Lecturer in Anatomy at the university, and in 1756 was appointed Professor of Anatomy.

== Work ==
Manzolini produced many models. These included models of the sensory and vocal organs that he prepared for the Royal Society in London, nine anatomical models for the King of Sardinia, and an anatomical compendium of 46 wax parts and 125 colored clay parts. Many of the models made by the Manzolinis were purchased by Giovanni Antonio Galli (1708-1782) for use in his school for midwives, then bought by Pope Benedict XIV and assigned to the Bologna Istituto delle Scienze and housed in the Palazzo Poggi, where they can be seen today.
