= Palazzo Poggi =

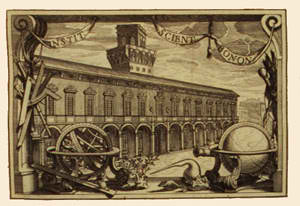
- View of the palace c. 1750

- Location within Italy

General information
- Type: Palace
- Location: Via Zamboni, 33, Bologna, Italy
- Coordinates: 44.496521°N 11.351129°E
- Construction started: 1549
- Completed: 1560
- Owner: University of Bologna

Website
- www.museopalazzopoggi.unibo.it/index.do

The Palazzo Poggi is a palazzo in Via Zamboni 33, Bologna, Italy. It is the headquarters of the University of Bologna and of the rector of the university.

== History ==
The Palazzo Poggi was built as the home of Alessandro Poggi and his brother the future Cardinal Giovanni Poggio. The building was erected between 1549 and 1560. The design of the Palazzo Poggi has been attributed to Bartolomeo Triachini. He was apparently given the commission for the Palazzo Poggi by the Bishop Giovanni Poggi shortly before he was elevated to Cardinal. (Note: A manuscript by Lamo from 1560 attributes the Palazzo Poggi to Triachini, and this is confirmed by a document dated 1554 published by Zucchini.) Other sources attribute the design of the Palazzo Poggi to Pellegrino Tibaldi. Cardinal Poggi met Pellegrino Tibaldi after the painter moved to Rome in 1547, and later commissioned him to paint the Palazzo Poggi. Tibaldi, a native of Bologna, returned to the city in 1555 and painted frescos for the Cardinal in the palace and the family chapel. The frescoes are considered Tibaldi's masterpiece.

In 1714 the Palazzo Poggi became the House of the Instituto dell Scienze of Bologna. The Institute of Sciences was founded by Luigi Ferdinando Marsili. The Tower Observatory (La Specola) at the Observatory of Bologna was built between 1712 and 1725. The library was built in 1744 following designs by Giuseppe Antonio Torri and Carlo Francesco Dotti. The collection of images was begun in 1754. The monumental Great Hall of the institute was added to the north side of the palace in the eighteenth century, opened in 1756.

The Institute of Science was a model learning establishment in Europe during the Age of Enlightenment and a key part of the University of Bologna. It enjoyed the protection of the Bolognese Pope Pope Benedict XIV (Prospero Lorenzo Lambertini). During the Napoleonic period, scientific equipment from the Institute was dispersed among different faculties (anatomy, optics, chemistry, geography, nautical science, physics, astronomy) and the historical collections were scattered in various museums. Only the library remained in the Palazzo Poggi, to form the nucleus of the future university library.

The Palazzo is now one of the main buildings of the University of Bologna. At the end of the twentieth century, a cultural project was promoted by the University to return and gather the dispersed collections back to their historic home.

== Layout and usage ==
The current appearance of the Palazzo Poggi, with a large courtyard with loggia and a large staircase to the piano nobile is due to the interventions by Cardinal Giovanni Poggi.

The palace has fresco decorations mainly from the Mannerist and early-Baroque periods, the works include:

- Rooms of Moses, David, and camerino of the Sphinxes by Prospero Fontana
- Rooms of Susana and of the Zodiac by Pellegrino Tibaldi
- Rooms of Camilla, Landscapes, the concert hall with Labors of Hercules, and of Winemaking Putti by Niccolò dell'Abbate
- Rooms of Grotteschi and Telemons by Fontana, Nosadella and Ercole Procaccini the Elder.

On the ground floor there is a hall dedicated to the poet Giosuè Carducci, the Aula Carducci, in which the poet gave lectures on the Italian language and literature for 40 years. Also on the ground floor there is the Hercules Room, holding a statue of the mythological hero sculpted by Angelo Piò in 1730. The palace also houses various university museums, the university rectorate, the Bologna University Library and the picture gallery, with over 600 fine portraits.

== Museum collections ==
- Natural history
  - Ulisse Aldrovandi Museum
  - Collections of Luigi Ferdinando Marsili
  - Diluvian Museum of the Institute of Science
- Anatomy and obstetrics
  - Obstetrics School
  - Anatomical wax models of Ercole Lelli
  - Anatomical wax models of Giovanni Manzolini and Anna Morandi Manzolini.
  - The Venerina of Clemente Susini
- Physics and chemistry
  - Light and optics
  - Electricity
- Geography room
- Military Architecture
- Library of the Institute of Science
- Gallery of ships

== Gallery ==
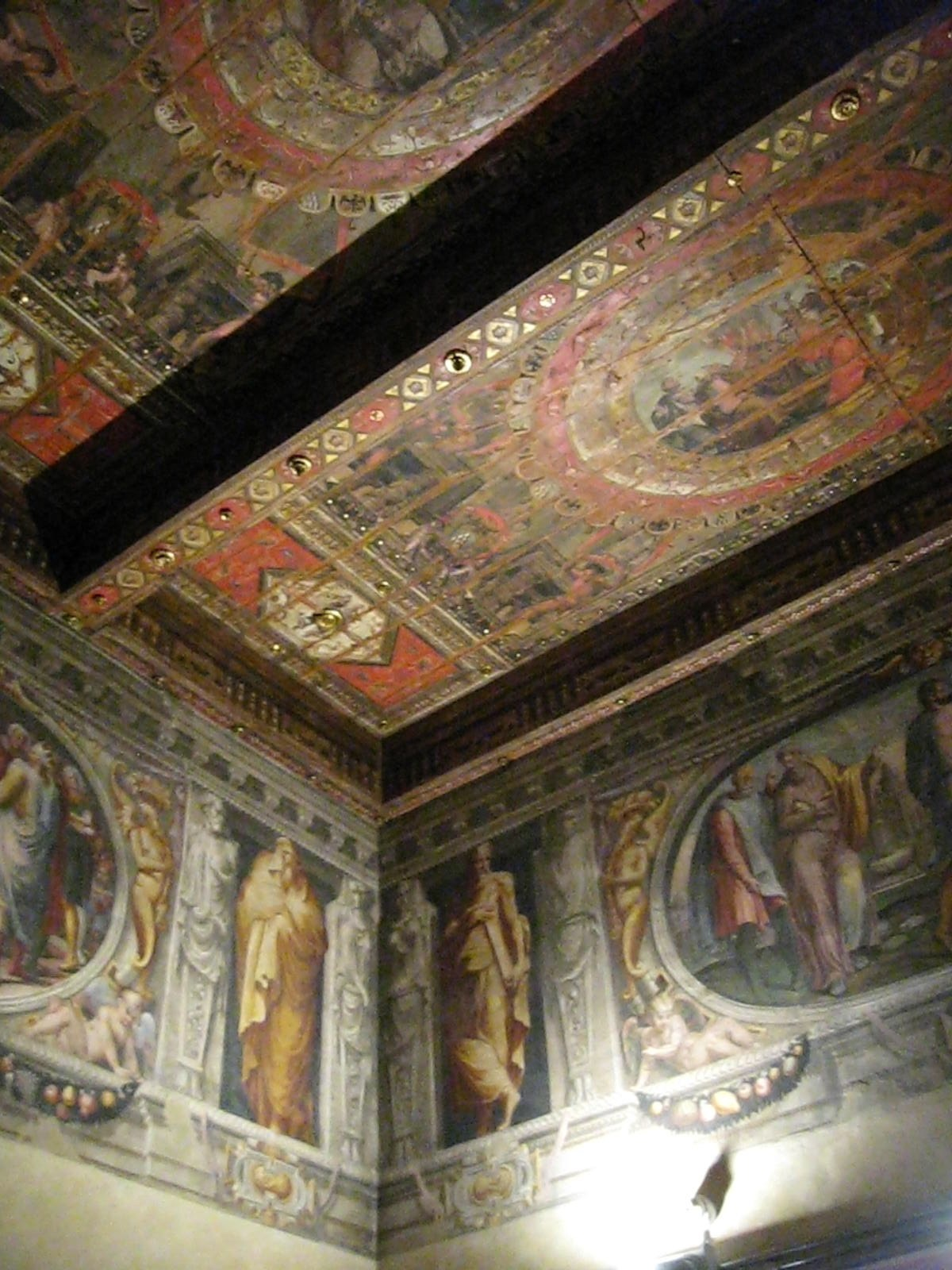
Ceiling of Sala of David by Prospero Fontana

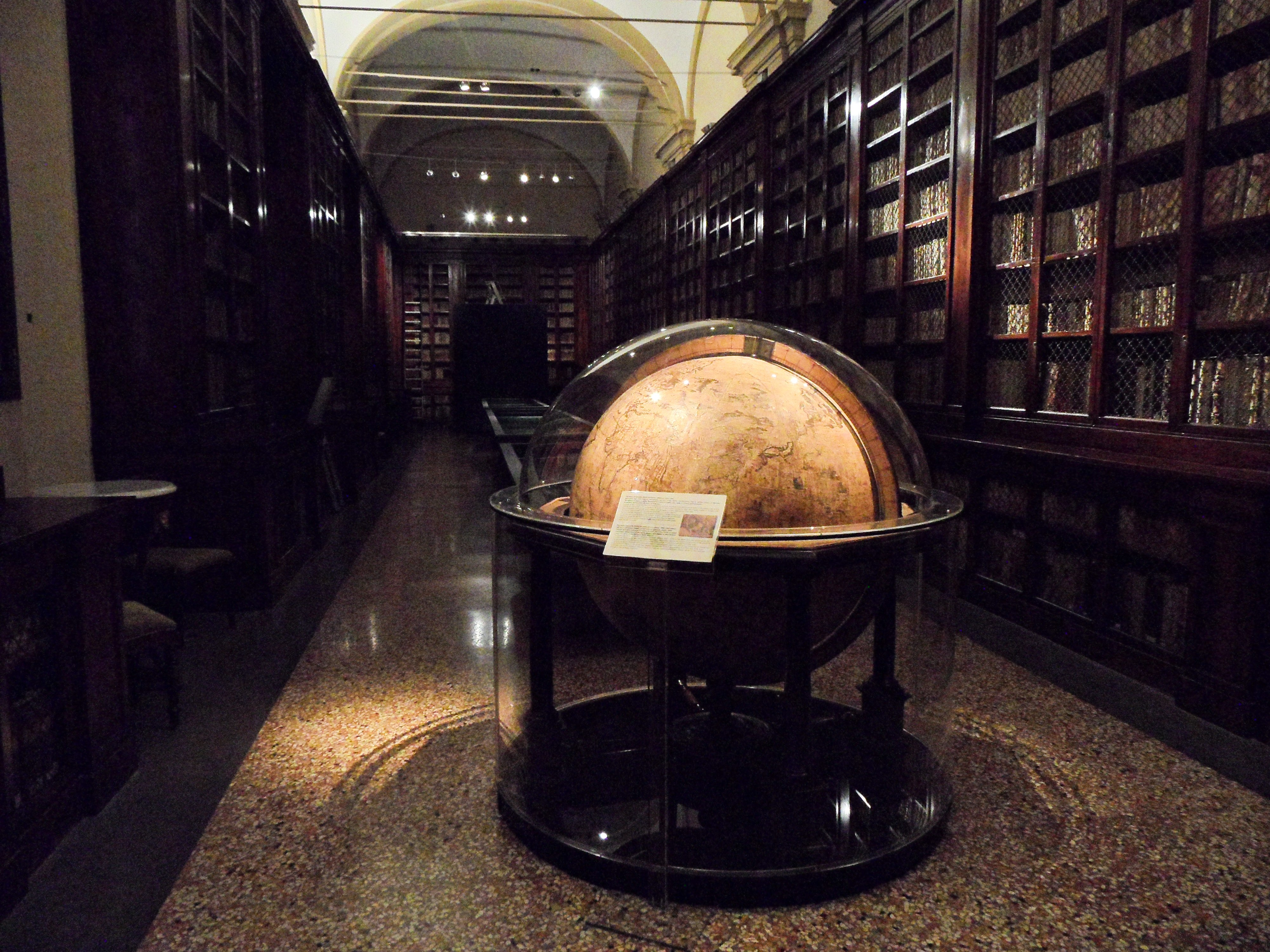
Seventeenth-century globe by Vincenzo Coronelli (Academy of Sciences of the Institute of Bologna)

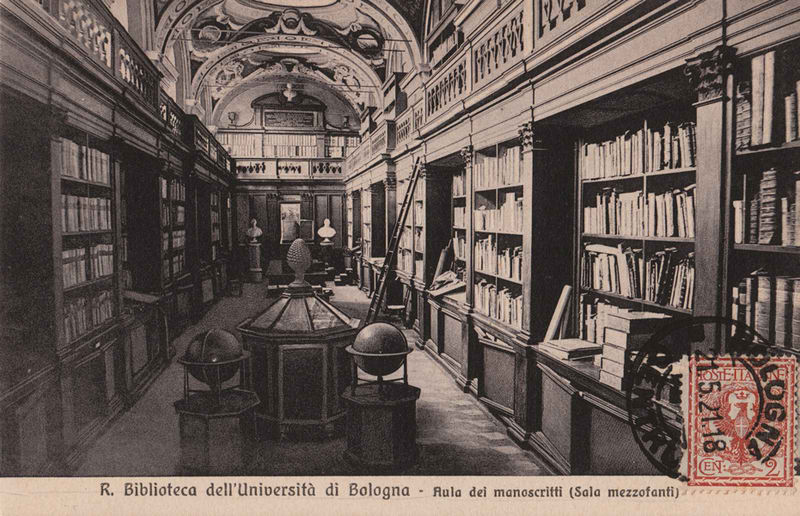
University library

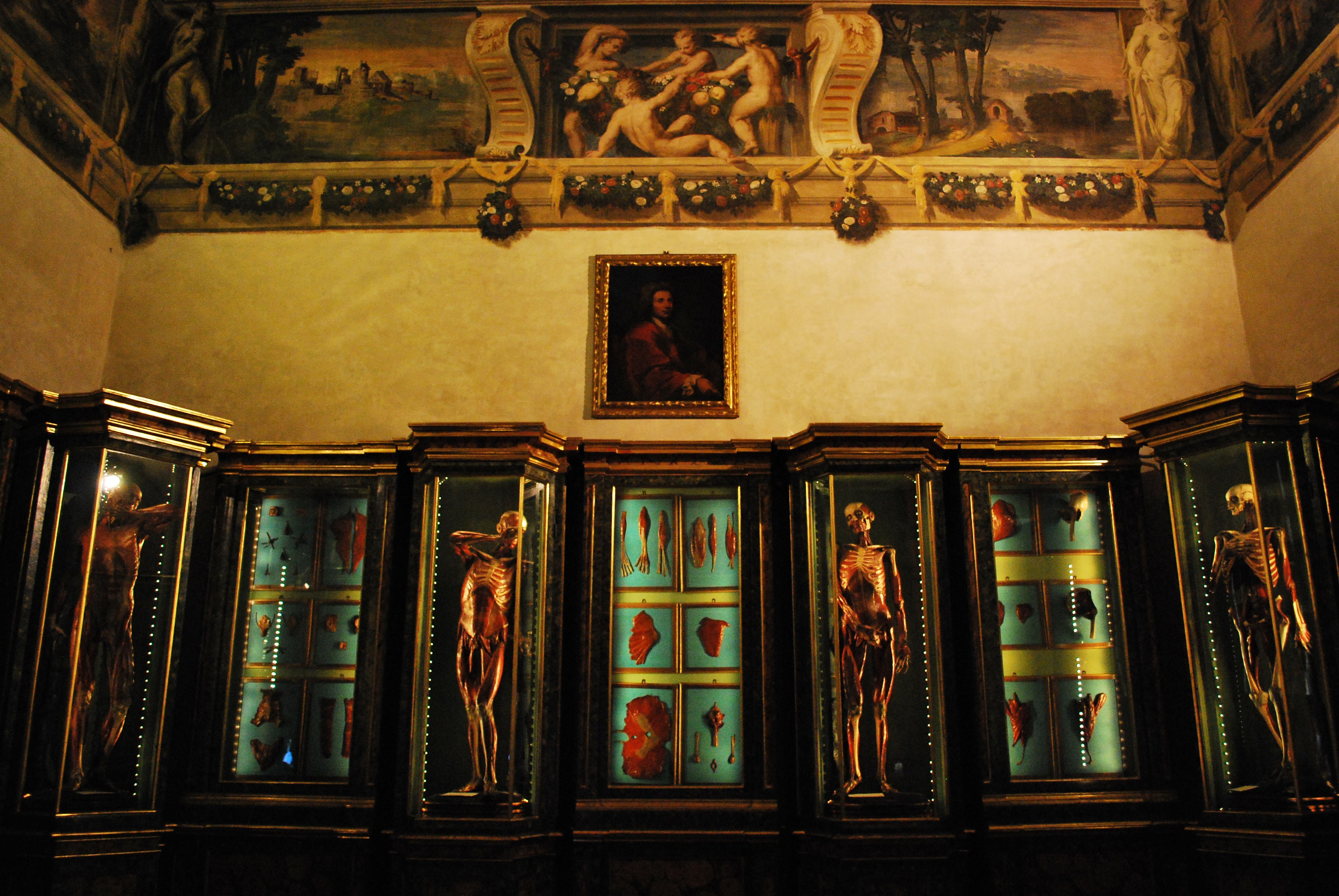
Exhibits in the anatomical museum

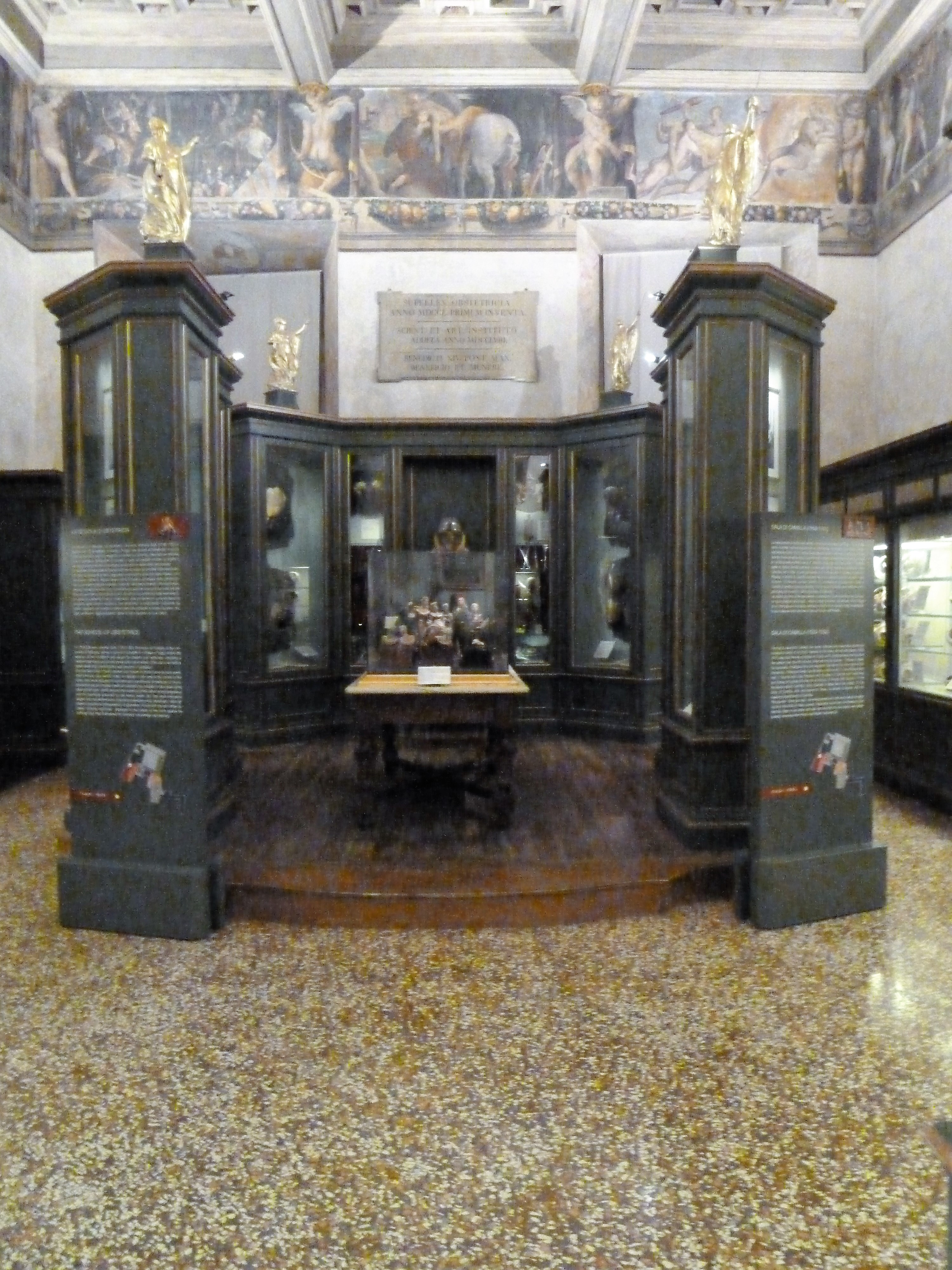
Further exhibits

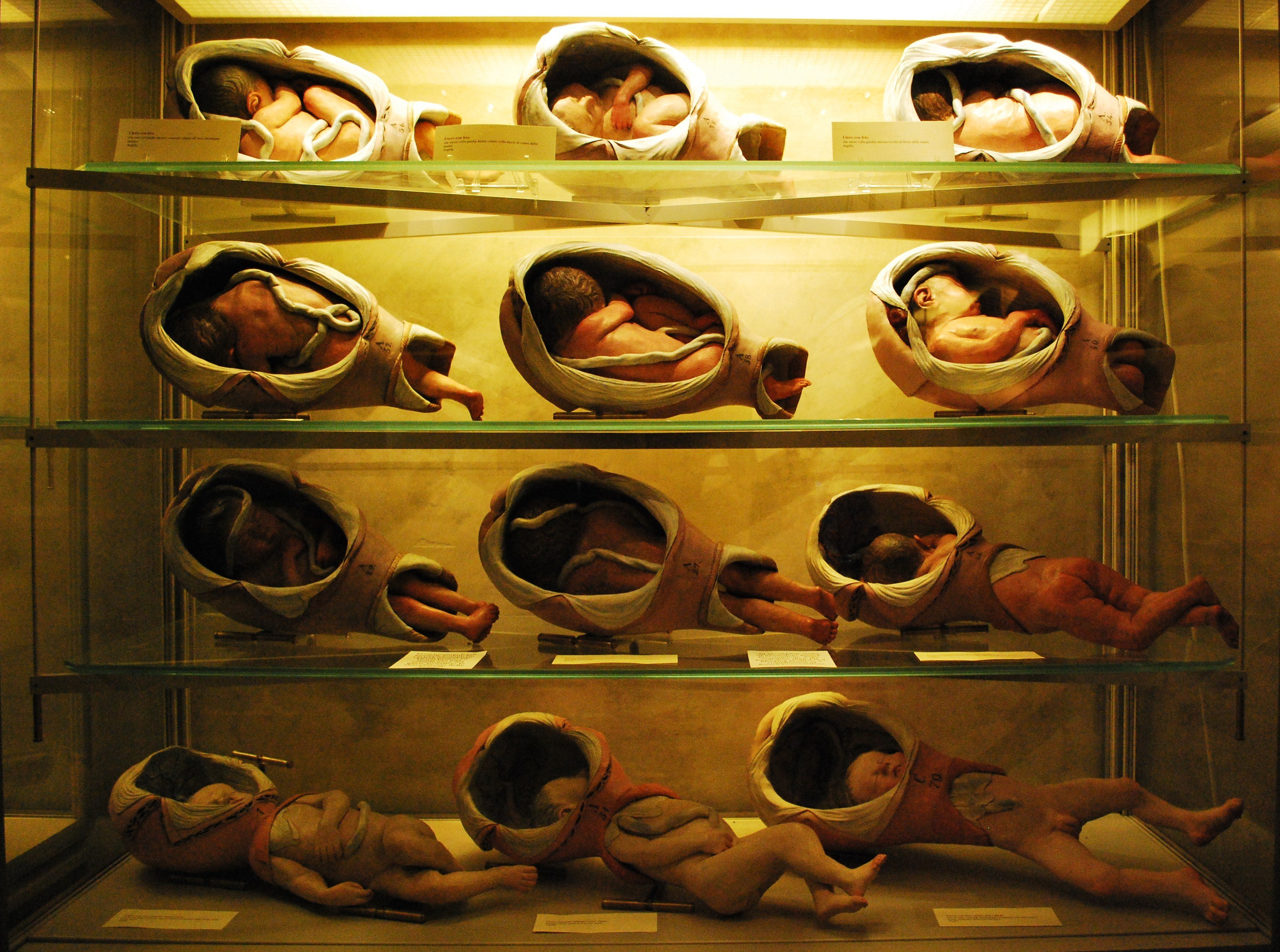
Models illustrating the birth process

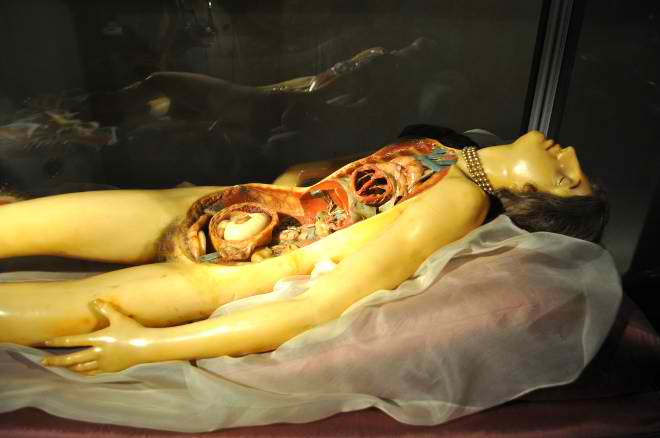
The "Venerina" of Clemente Susini (an anatomical wax model)

== Notes and references ==
Notes

Citations

Sources

- Accademia di Danimarca (2001). Analecta Romana Instituti Danici. "L'Erma" di Bretschneider.
- Bacou, Roseline; Viatte, Françoise (1974). Italian Renaissance Drawings from the Musee du Louvre, Paris: Roman, Tuscan and Emilian Schools 1500-1575. Exhibition OCT 11, 1974-JAN 5, 1975. Metropolitan Museum of Art. ISBN 978-0-87099-094-6.
- Barilli, Renato (2004). Maniera moderna e manierismo. Feltrinelli Editore. ISBN 978-88-07-10363-6.
- Farquhar, Maria (1855). Biographical catalogue of the principal Italian painters, by a lady [M. Farquhar] ed. by R.O. Wornum. p. 179.
- Grieco, Romy; Clò, Oriano Tassinari (1988). Bologna: a city to discover. Italcards. ISBN 978-88-7193-002-2.
- Modena, Claudio; Lourenço, Paulo B.; Roca, Pere (2005). Structural Analysis of Historical Constructions - 2 Volume Set: Possibilities of Numerical and Experimental Techniques - Proceedings of the Ivth Int. Seminar on Structural Analysis of Historical Constructions, 10-13 November 2004, Padova, Italy. Balkema Publ. ISBN 978-0-415-36379-2.
- "Triachini, Bartolomeo". Enciclopedia Italiana. Treccani.
- Wolk-Simon, Linda; Bambach, Carmen (2010). An Italian Journey: Drawings from the Tobey Collection : Correggio to Tiepolo. Metropolitan Museum of Art. ISBN 978-1-58839-379-1.

External links

- MeuS Museo europeo degli Studenti
