= Thomas D. Duane =

American ophthalmologist

Thomas David Duane
- Born: 1917; Peoria, Illinois, United States
- Died: 20 June 1993 (aged 75–76); Newtown, Bucks County, Pennsylvania
- Education: Harvard University, Northwestern University, University of Iowa
- Known for: Valsalva retinopathy
- Awards: Lucien Howe Medal
- Scientific career
- Fields: ophthalmology
- Workplaces: Jefferson Medical College, Wills Eye Hospital

Thomas David Duane was an American ophthalmologist better known for studies in the field of retina. He identified that the blackouts experienced by wartime pilots during acceleration is due to reduced blood supply to the retina. In 1972, he first described Valsalva retinopathy a form of retinopathy caused by a sudden increase in intrathoracic or intra-abdominal pressure.

== Biography ==
Thomas D. Duane was born in 1917, in Peoria, Illinois in the United States. As a Shakespearean scholar, Duane studied playwright in England and later graduated from Harvard University. After completing bachelor's degree in Biochemistry he done his medical degree and master's from Northwestern University, and later done his doctorate in physiology from University of Iowa, in 1947.

Duane held several positions including chairman of the American Medical Association's ophthalmology section and chairman of the ophthalmology department at Jefferson Medical College. In 1970 he became president of the staff at Jefferson, and is the first ophthalmologist to receive this honor. In 1981, he retired as head of the ophthalmology department at Jefferson Medical College in Philadelphia and Wills Eye Hospital in Philadelphia.

=== Personal life and death ===
Duane and his wife Julia McElhinney have four children, Joseph M, Andrew T, Alexa D. Bresnan and Rachel D. Lee. Duane met Julia McElhinney during his internship at Evanston Hospital in Illinois in 1943-1944 and married her in March 1944. He died of complications from Parkinson's disease on June 20, 1993, at the age of 75 in a nursing home in Newtown, Bucks County, Pennsylvania.

== Contributions ==
While working as a Navy Flight Surgeon in the U.S. Navy, during the Korean War, Duane investigated pilots' vision problems and identified the cause of the blackouts experienced by wartime pilots during acceleration. He discovered that blackouts and grayouts experienced by pilots was due to reduced blood supply to the retina. In 1972, he first described Valsalva retinopathy a form of retinopathy occur due to pre-retinal hemorrhage caused by a sudden increase in intrathoracic or intraabdominal pressure.

Duane edited two well known ophthalmology reference works, Clinical Ophthalmology and Biomedical Foundations of Ophthalmology.

=== Works ===
- Duane, Thomas D (1998). Duane's foundations of clinical ophthalmology (3 volumes). Lippincott Williams & Wilkins. OCLC 439704671.
- Duane, Thomas David; Tasman, William; Jaeger, Edward A (2011). Duane's Ophthalmology (9 volumes). Lippincott Williams & Wilkins. ISBN 978-1-4511-1217-7. OCLC 701565989.
- Duane's clinical ophthalmology (6 volumes). Philadelphia: Lippincott-Raven. 1995.

== Awards and honors ==
Duane has twice received the Lucien Howe Medal, the highest honor in ophthalmology.
