= Ferdinando Cospi =

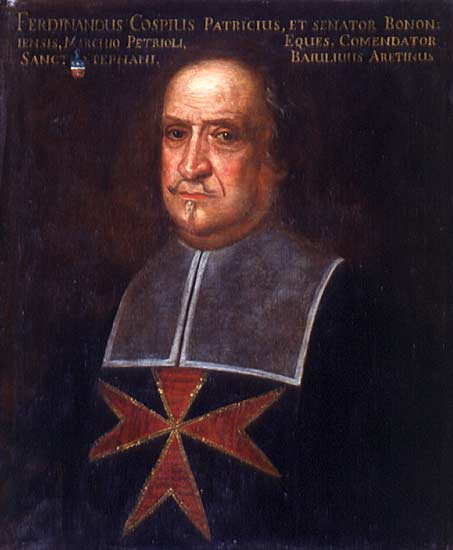
- Born: Ferdinando Cospi; 1606; Bologna, Papal States
- Died: January 19, 1686 (aged 79–80); Bologna, Papal States
- Resting place: San Petronio, Bologna
- Occupation: Senator
- Known for: Cabinet of curiosities

Marchese Ferdinando Cospi (1606 - 1686) was a Bolognese nobleman who acquired a large collection of natural curiosities, donated for the use of scholars to the city of Bologna in 1657.

== Early life ==
Ferdinando Cospi was born in Bologna in 1606, son of Constance de' Medici and Vincenzo Cospi. His father belonged to an ancient Bolognese family. In December 1601, Vincenzo Cospi was involved in a fight in which he mortally wounded his opponent. Sentenced to death, he fled to Florence. He was befriended by the future Grand Duke Ferdinando I, who made him a courtier. In August 1604 Vincenzo Cospi married a great-granddaughter of Cardinal Alessandro Ottaviano de' Medici, who the next year was briefly Pope Leo XI before dying in office. Vincenzo Cospi was pardoned, and in 1606 was in Bologna, where Ferdinando Cospi was born.

In 1610 Vincenzo was involved in another fight, this time bloodless, but was again forced to flee to Florence. Here, at the age of eight, Ferdinando Cospi became a page of Cosimo II de' Medici, Grand Duke of Tuscany. In 1616 he joined the Order of the Knights of St. Stephen, but so he would not have to serve on a galley he was made a page of the grand master, who was also the Grand Duke, and who brought him up with his children. When Cosimo II died in 1621, Ferdinando II promoted Cospi to a page of the black livery, and took him to live in the Palazzo Vecchio.

== Later career ==
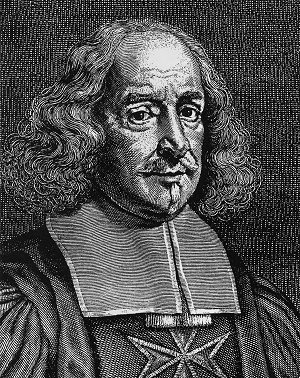
Ferdinando Cospi from the catalog of his museum

Cospi’s father died in Bologna in 1624, and he inherited the family property and position. He became the representative of the Grand Duke Ferdinando II in Bologna. This involved formal diplomatic services and attendance at functions and ceremonies. He mediated between the Bolognese and Tuscan authorities, and promoted trade and the interests of Florence in Bologna. He also helped the Medicis to obtain the services of Bolognese artists.

In 1637 Cospi married Smeralda di Annibale Banzi. They had just one daughter, Dorotea, although Cospi was said to have had a child in Florence whom the Granduchess Vittoria della Rovere accepted as one of her court ladies.

As the value of his services increased, the Grand Duke increased Cospi’s salary and in 1641 made him bailiff of Arezzo within the Order of Saint Stephen. In 1643 Cospi escorted the new Cardinal Giancarlo de' Medici to Rome to receive his cap. In 1646 he undertook a mission to Milan to pay respects on behalf of the Grand Duke to the new governor, Bernardino Fernández de Velasco, 6th Duke of Frías. Two years later he was given the hereditary title of Marquis of Petriolo. On 9 May 1650 he became a senator of Bologna. The next year he made another trip for the Cardinal Giancarlo de' Medici to pay his respects to Mariana of Austria, the new Queen of Spain. In 1664, 1665 and 1672 he was Gonfaloniere of Bologna.

In 1673 Cospi resigned from the office of senator, but continued to take part in public life. He died in Bologna on 19 January 1686 and was buried in San Petronio in the family chapel.

== Cabinet of Curiosities ==
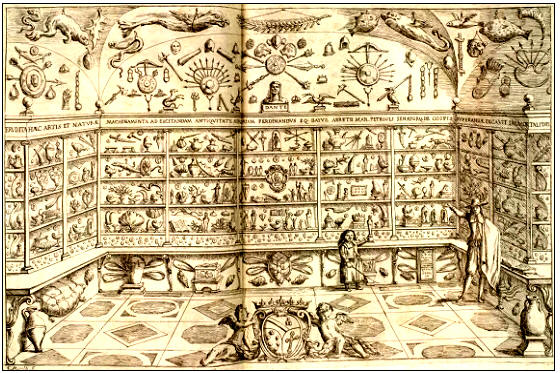
The Cabinet of Curiosities

On 28 June 1660 Cospi donated his museum to the Senate. It seems that Tatto had already compiled a short printed catalog of the collection. In 1667 Cospi printed, at his expense, a full description of the “Museo Cospiano” in five volumes. The first two described the natural history specimens and the last three covered the archaeological objects.

A picture of the “Cabinet of curiosities” has been preserved. It includes truly natural specimens as well as some man-made specimens of fictitious animals such as a winged fish and a Hippocampus, half horse and half fish. In the picture, the bust of Dante Alighieri forms the centerpiece of the collection. Below and to its right is the dwarf Sebastiano Biavati, a living member of his collection, and Cospi himself stands to the right. The collection was combined with a collection made by Ulisse Aldrovandi. In 1743 the Academy of Sciences of Bologna Institute obtained the donation of this collection, the Naturalia Museum.
