= Anna Morandi Manzolini =

Italian anatomist and artist (1714–1774)

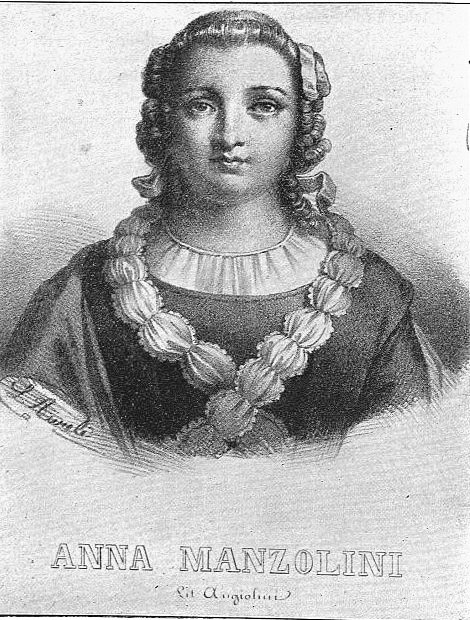
- Born: Anna Morandi; 21 January 1714; Bologna, Papal States
- Died: 9 July 1774 (aged 60); Bologna, Papal States
- Occupation: Sculptor
- Known for: Anatomical models

Anna Morandi Manzolini (née Morandi; 21 January 1714 – 9 July 1774) was an Italian anatomist, anatomical wax modeler, and lecturer of anatomical design at the University of Bologna. She became internationally known for the production of anatomical wax models based on anatomical dissections.

== Life ==
Morandi was born on 21 January 1714 in Bologna, Italy. She was raised in a traditional home where marriage, children, and a domestic lifestyle were natural choices for women. Women were expected to be wives, raise their children and essentially tend to their husbands needs and wants. This wasn’t the case for Anna Morandi. She became a wife and had children, but instead of tending to her husband, she worked side by side with him. In 1736, Morandi married her childhood sweetheart, Giovanni Manzolini, a professor of anatomy at the University of Bologna. She was 20, and he was 24 years old. After five years of marriage, she had become the mother of six children.

Giovanni Manzolini initially worked in collaboration with Ercole Lelli to produce models under the sponsorship of Pope Benedict XIV but they parted ways and Manzolini opened a studio at home where he and Anna practiced. The studio was not only for art but became an anatomy “school” and laboratory for them both. The couple worked together dissecting bodies and learning from them. Between Giovanni’s expertise in human anatomy and Anna’s artistic abilities, they were able to recreate such incredible pieces by remodeling human anatomy through sculpture. They taught an abundance of medical students because they had access to many body parts and cadavers. Giovanni and Anna quickly became well known around, not only in Bologna but Italy as a whole being that by the early 1750s, the couple had been recognized locally and internationally.

In the year 1755, her husband died, leaving both her and her two surviving children without reliable support. As a result, she had to place one child, Guiseppe, in an orphanage. She received tempting job offerings from other universities, but she preferred to remain in her native city, Bologna. After appealing to the pope and passing a strenuous examination by the Bolognese Senate, Manzolini was granted a small annual amount of 300 liras for support. Additionally, she received a post at the University of Bologna as an anatomical demonstrator with access to cadavers from the Bologna hospital.

Anna Morandi Manzolini impacted the 18th-century Bolognese culture through an artistic and scientific approach. She brought human anatomy to life and allowed many spectators to learn and enjoy her anatomical pieces. Tourists, especially medical practitioners, from all over the world came to see her work.

Morandi died in the city on 9 July 1774, at the age of 60.

== Career ==
Knowledge of Morandi's talent in molding anatomical models spread throughout Europe, and she was invited to the court of Catherine II of Russia as well as other royal courts. It became a major turning point in her life. In order to learn anatomy, Morandi had to dissect cadavers, which was extremely difficult for her, but she overcame her fears. Giovanni Manzolini was so encouraged by her and her accomplishments that he again returned to his work. They were recognized as a team by many artists, intellectuals, and anatomists in Europe. When Morandi's husband became ill with tuberculosis, she received special permission to lecture in his place. After her husband's death in 1755, Morandi was appointed Lecturer in Anatomy in her own name by the Institute of Bologna.

== Works ==
Morandi partnered with her husband, and then surpassed him in skill and reputation after his death in 1755 in the scientific knowledge of human anatomy as well as the accurate demonstration of anatomy in wax sculpture. During her famed household lectures on anatomy given before medical practitioners and grand tourists alike, she imparted expert knowledge of empirical anatomy derived from the dissection of more than 1,000 cadavers by her own account, as well as of anatomical discoveries made both by the couple and Morandi alone. She clearly demonstrated, both theoretically and practically, the structure of the human body.

Morandi also crafted two portrait busts in wax, both of which are currently on display at the Palazzo Poggi in Bologna. One is a self-portrait, in which she depicts herself at work dissecting a human brain; the other is of her husband, engaged in similar activity. Morandi's wax models were highly prized both while she was alive and long after her death. Some of her anatomical models were so skilfully moulded that they were extremely difficult to distinguish from the actual body parts from which they were copied. Furthermore, her acute skill at dissection resulted in her discovery of several previously unknown anatomical parts, including the termination of the oblique muscle of the eye. She held the distinction of having been the first person to reproduce body parts of minute portions in wax, including capillary vessels and nerves.

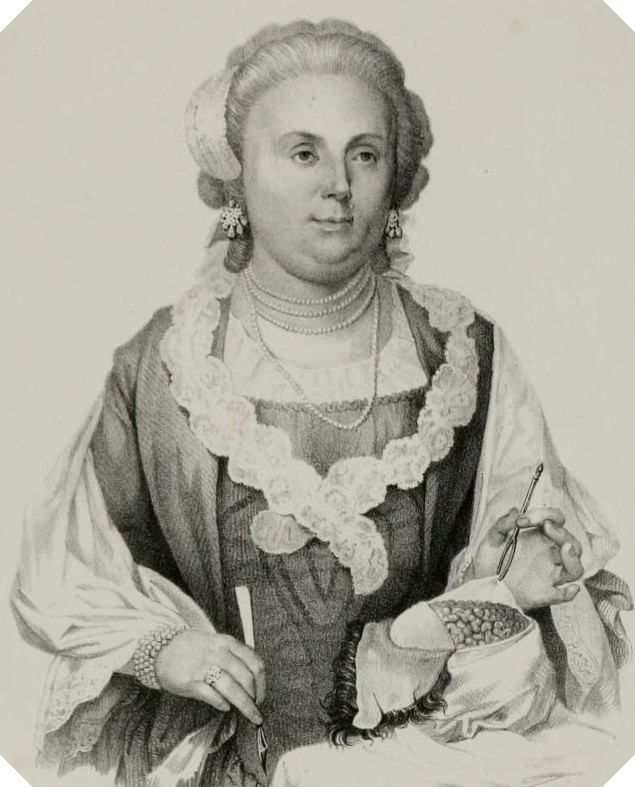
Self-Portrait Bust, drawing by Caesar Bettini

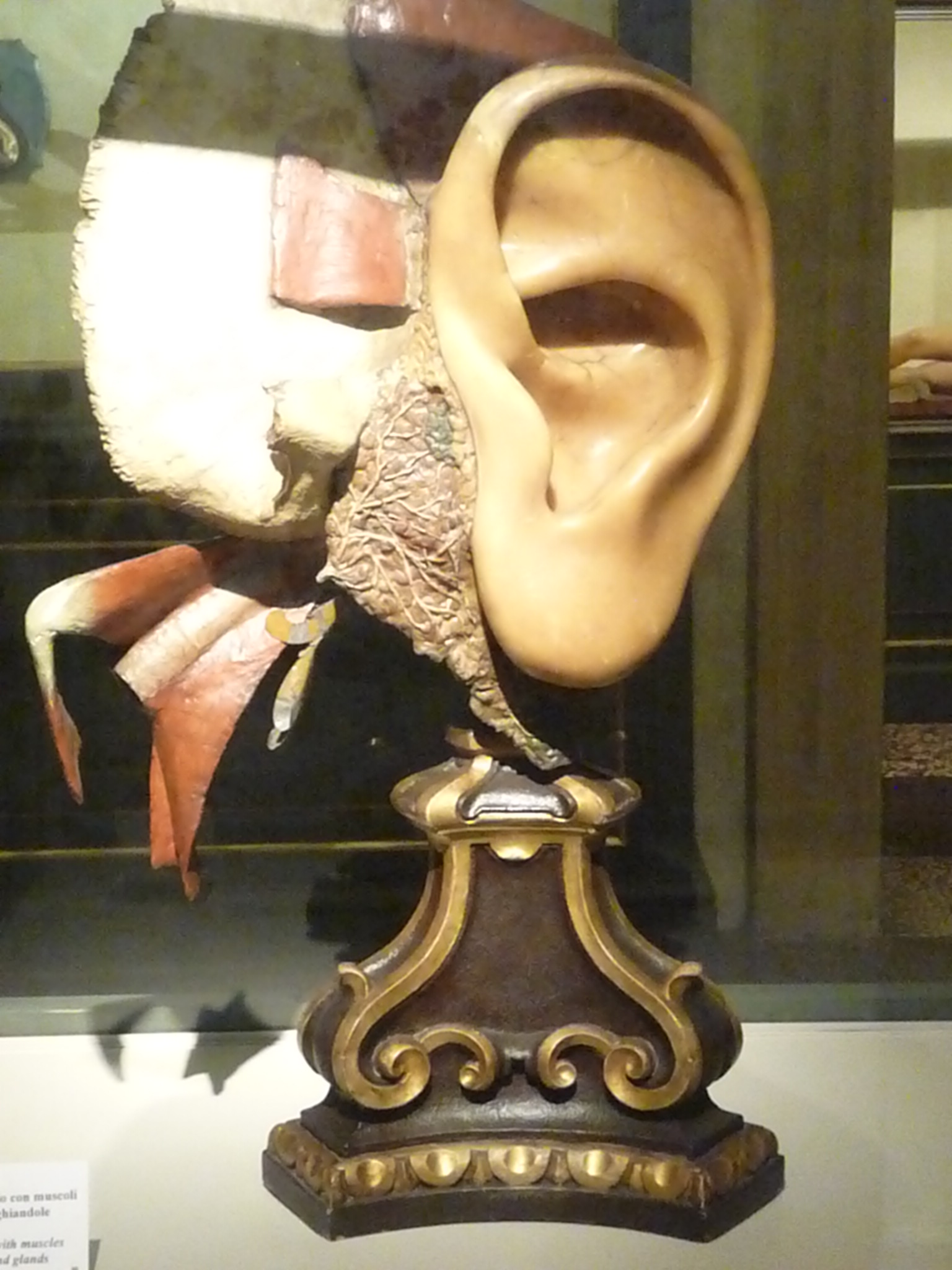
Wax model of an Ear by Anna Manzolini

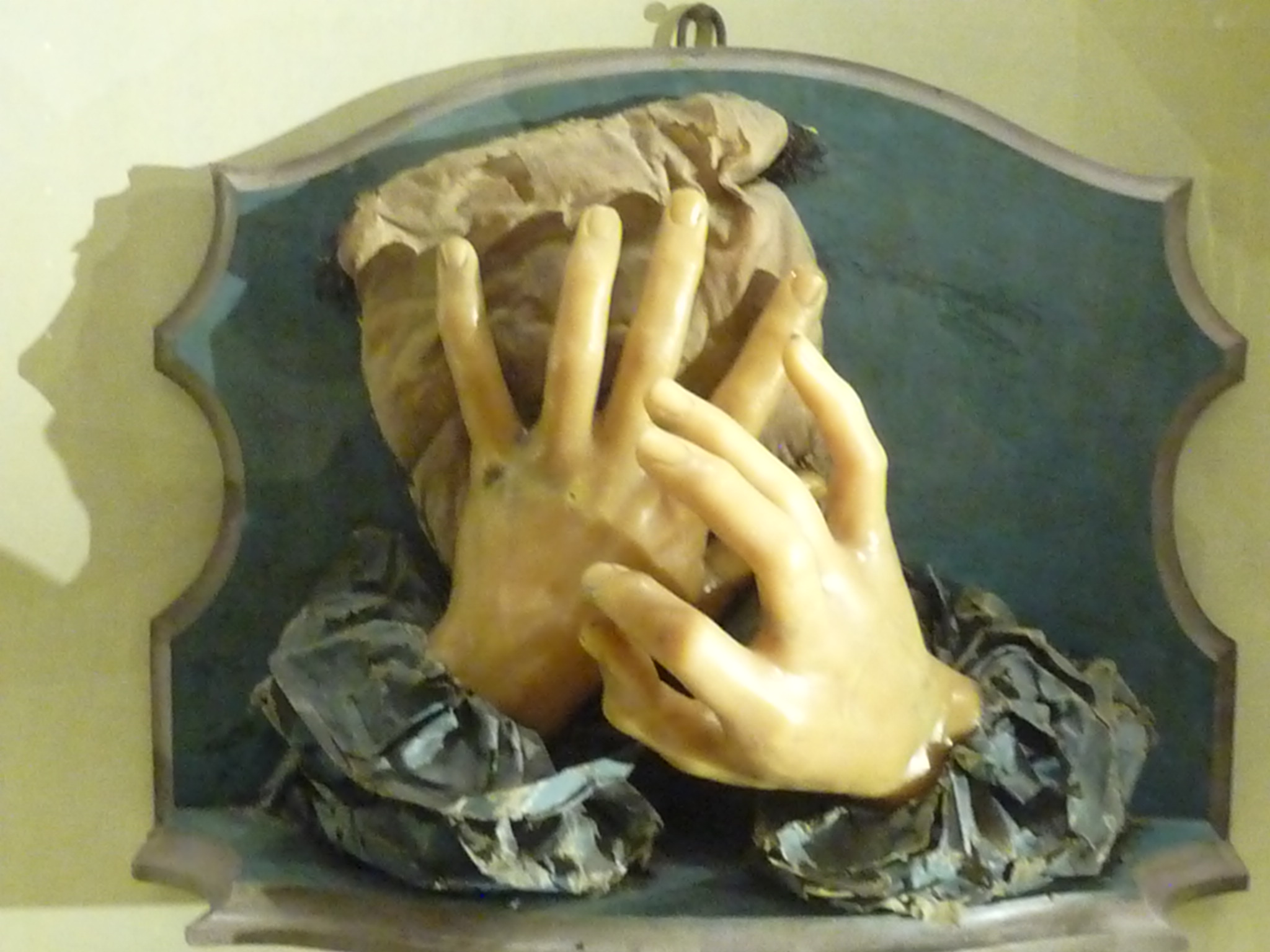
Wax model of hands by Anna Morandi Manzolini

== Supellex Manzoliniana ==
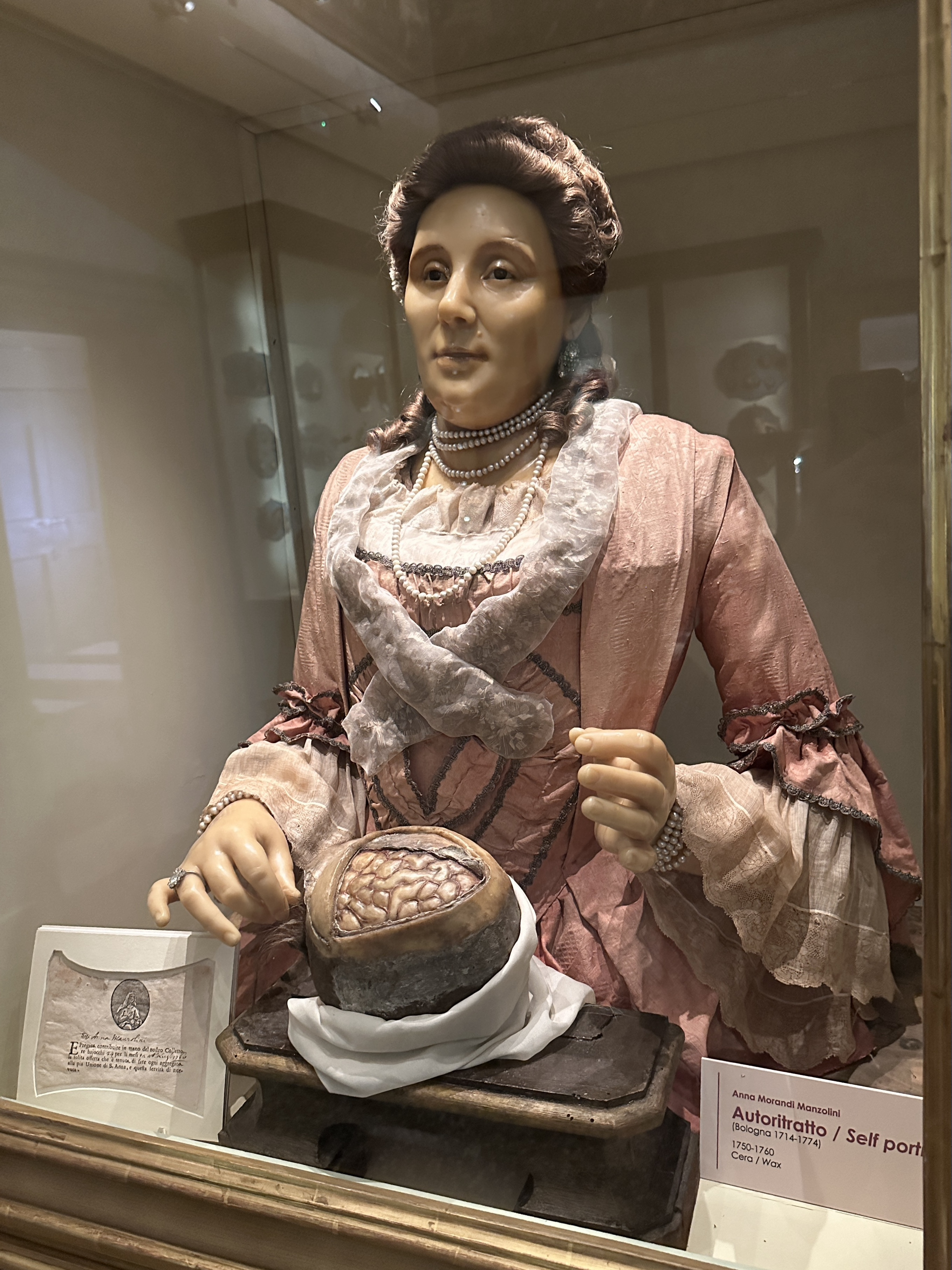
1750s self-portrait in wax

Morandi's collection of wax models was known throughout Europe as Supellex Manzoliniana, and was eagerly sought after to aid in the study of anatomy. Her work became the archetype of such models as the Vassourie collection and the creations of Dr. Auzoux made from papier-mâché, which were the forerunners of those used in today's schools and colleges. A collection of her models was acquired by the Medical Institute of Bologna and is housed at the Institute of Science in Bologna. Her wax self-portrait showing her dissecting a human brain was placed from 1776 in the anatomy museum of the Institute of Sciences in Palazzo Poggi alongside her wax bust of her husband. They were returned to the Poggi in 2000.

== Honors ==
- The title of Professor of Anatomy by the Institute of Bologna, 1756
- The added title of Modelatrice by the Institute of Bologna, 1760
- Honoured by numerous heads of state
- Emperor Joseph II of Austria bought one of her models and showed his appreciation of her skill and attainments
- Catherine II of Russia invited her to Moscow to lecture and made her a member of the Russian Royal Scientific Association
- The British Royal Society elected her a member and invited her to lecture in London
- Honoured in Italy as the inventor and perfecter of anatomical preparations in wax

== See also ==
- Timeline of women in science
