= Valsalva maneuver =

Technique for equalising pressure in the middle ears

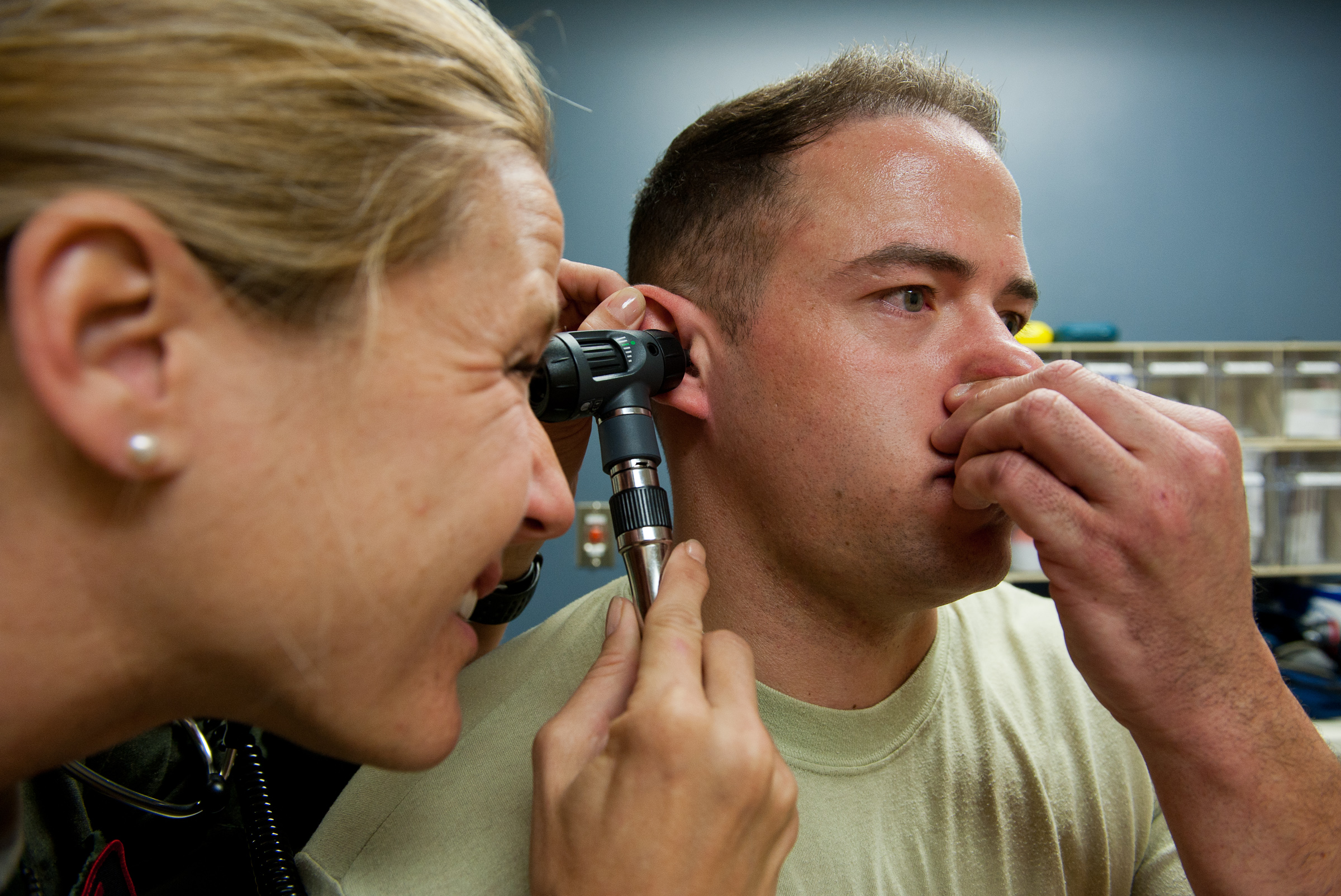
- A patient performs the Valsalva maneuver during examination with an otoscope.

The Valsalva maneuver is performed by a forceful attempt of exhalation against a closed airway, usually done by closing one's mouth and pinching one's nose shut while expelling air, as if blowing up a balloon. Variations of the maneuver may be used either in medical examination as a test of cardiac function and autonomic nervous control of the heart (because the maneuver raises the pressure in the lungs), or to clear the ears and sinuses (that is, to equalize pressure between them) when ambient pressure changes, as in scuba diving, hyperbaric oxygen therapy, or air travel.

A modified version is executed by expiring against a closed glottis. This will elicit the cardiovascular responses described below, but will not force air into the Eustachian tubes.

== History ==
The technique is named after Antonio Maria Valsalva, a seventeenth-century physician and anatomist from Bologna whose principal scientific interest was the human ear. He described the eustachian tube and the maneuver to test its patency (openness).

== Physiological response ==
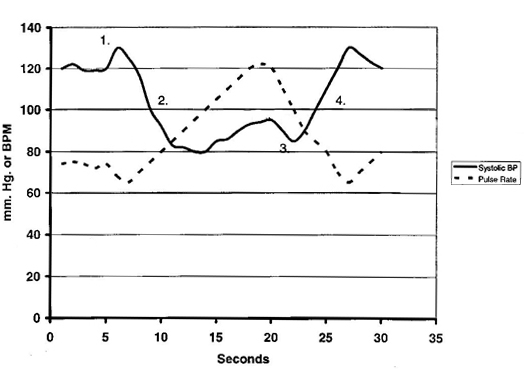
Blood pressure (systolic) and pulse rate during a normal response to a Valsalva maneuver, forty-millimeter mercury pressure is applied at 5 seconds and relieved at 20 seconds.

The normal physiological response consists of four phases.

1. Initial pressure rise
  On application of expiratory force, pressure rises inside the chest forcing blood out of the pulmonary circulation into the left atrium. This causes a mild rise in stroke volume during the first few seconds of the maneuver.
2. Reduced venous return and compensation
  Return of systemic blood to the heart is impeded by the pressure inside the chest. The output of the heart is reduced, and stroke volume falls. This occurs from 5 to about 14 seconds in the illustration. The fall in stroke volume reflexively causes blood vessels to constrict with some rise in pressure (15 to 20 seconds). This compensation may be marked with pressure returning to near or above normal, but the cardiac output and blood flow to the body remain low. During this time, the pulse rate increases (compensatory tachycardia).
3. Pressure release
  The pressure on the chest is released, allowing the pulmonary vessels and the aorta to re-expand, causing a further initial slight fall in stroke volume (20 to 23 seconds) due to decreased left atrial return and increased aortic volume, respectively. Venous blood can once more enter the chest and the heart; cardiac output increases.
4. Return of cardiac output
  Blood return to the heart is enhanced by the effect of the entry of blood that has been dammed back, causing a rapid increase in cardiac output (24 seconds on). The stroke volume usually rises above normal before returning to a normal level. With the return of blood pressure, the pulse rate returns to normal.

In summary, the maneuver increases intrathoracic pressure and, thus, a decrease in preload to the heart. This decreased preload leads to cardiovascular changes through the baroreflex and other compensatory reflex mechanisms. Deviation from this response pattern signifies either abnormal heart function or abnormal autonomic nervous control of the heart.

Dentists also use Valsalva following extraction of a maxillary molar tooth. The maneuver is performed to determine if there is a perforation or antral communication.

== Uses ==
=== Normalizing middle-ear pressures ===
When rapid ambient pressure increase occurs, as in underwater diving or aircraft descent, this pressure tends to hold the eustachian tubes closed, preventing pressure equalization across the eardrum and causing pain. To avoid this painful situation, divers, caisson workers and people in pressurized aircraft attempt to open the eustachian tubes by swallowing, which tends to open the tubes, allowing the ear to equalize itself.

If this fails, then the Valsalva maneuver may be used. This maneuver, when used as a tool to equalize middle ear pressure, carries with it the risk of auditory damage from over-pressurization of the middle ear. The Valsalva maneuver generates about 20–40 mm of Hg pressure. It is safer, if time permits, to attempt to open the eustachian tubes by swallowing a few times, or yawning, or by using the Valsalva technique of breathing a minimal amount of air gently into nostrils held closed by the fingers as soon as mild pressure is felt before it increases to the point that its release would be painful. The effectiveness of the "yawning" method can be improved with practice; some people can achieve release or opening by moving their jaw forward or forward and down, rather than straight down as in a classical yawn, and some can do so without moving their jaw at all by activating the tensor tympani muscle, which is heard by the individual as a deep, rumbling sound.

During swallowing or yawning, several muscles in the pharynx (throat) elevate the soft palate and open the throat. One of these muscles, the tensor veli palatini, also acts to open the eustachian tube. This is why swallowing or yawning is successful in equalizing middle ear pressure. Contrary to popular belief, the jaw does not pinch the tubes shut when closed. The eustachian tubes are not located close enough to the mandible to be pinched off. People often recommend chewing gum during ascent/descent in aircraft because chewing gum increases the rate of salivation, and swallowing the excess saliva opens the eustachian tubes.

In a clinical setting, the Valsalva maneuver is commonly done against a closed glottis or an external pressure measuring device, thus eliminating or minimizing the pressure on the eustachian tubes. Straining or blowing against resistance, as in blowing up balloons, has a Valsalva effect, and the fall in blood pressure may result in dizziness and even fainting.

=== Strength training ===
The Valsalva maneuver is commonly believed to be the optimal breathing pattern for producing maximal force. It is frequently used in powerlifting to stabilize the trunk during exercises such as the squat, deadlift, and bench press, and in both lifts of Olympic weightlifting.

=== Pain management ===
The Valsalva maneuver may reduce pain during lumbar puncture. According to Kumar, et al., performing the maneuver on an awake patient triggers predictable cardiovascular and autonomic responses that can be timed by a skilled surgeon to maximize anesthetic benefit.

=== Regulation of heart rhythm ===
The Valsalva maneuver may be used to arrest episodes of supraventricular tachycardia. Blood pressure (BP) rises at onset of straining-because the increased intrathoracic pressure (ITP) is added to the pressure in the aorta. It then falls because the ITP compresses the veins, decreasing the venous return and cardiac output. This inhibits the baroreceptors, causing tachycardia and a rise in peripheral vascular resistance (PVR). When the glottis is opened and the ITP returns to normal, cardiac output is restored, but the peripheral vessels are constricted. The blood pressure therefore rises above normal, and this stimulates the baroreceptors, causing bradycardia and a drop in BP to a normal level.

=== Diagnosis ===
==== Cardiology ====
Sometimes, the maneuver may be used to diagnose heart abnormalities, especially when used in conjunction with an echocardiogram. For example, the Valsalva maneuver (phase II) increases the intensity of hypertrophic cardiomyopathy murmurs, namely those of dynamic subvalvular left ventricular outflow obstruction. This is due to the decreased preload in this phase, worsening the obstruction and thus accentuating the murmur. At the same time, the Valsalva maneuver (phase II) decreases the intensity of most other murmurs, including those resulting from aortic stenosis and atrial septal defect. The decrease in murmur intensity occurs from a smaller preload, which reduces the amount of blood ejected through the stenotic aortic valve, thereby decreasing murmur intensity.

Effect of Valsalva (phase II)	Cardiac finding
Decreases murmur
Decreases murmur	Aortic stenosis
Decreases murmur	Pulmonic stenosis
Decreases murmur	Tricuspid regurgitation
Increases murmur	Hypertrophic cardiomyopathy
Increases murmur	Mitral valve prolapse
Earlier onset of murmur
Earlier onset of murmur	Mitral valve prolapse

==== Neurology ====
The Valsalva maneuver is used to aid in the clinical diagnosis of problems or injuries in the nerves of the cervical spine. Upon performing the Valsalva maneuver, intraspinal pressure slightly increases. Thus, neuropathies or radicular pain may be felt or exacerbated, which may indicate nerve impingement by an intervertebral disc or other part of the anatomy. Headache and pain upon performing the Valsalva maneuver are also one of the main symptoms in Arnold–Chiari malformation. The Valsalva maneuver may help check for a dural tear following certain spinal operations, such as a microdiscectomy. An increase in intra-spinal pressure will cause cerebral spinal fluid (CSF) to leak out of the dura, causing a headache.

The Valsalva maneuver has been associated with transient global amnesia.

==== Palpation of supraclavicular lymph nodes ====
As the lymph nodes may be buried, asking the patient to perform the Valsalva maneuver may push the cupola of the lung upward, bringing deep-seated nodes to a more accessible position for palpation. Palpation may identify an enlargement of the supraclavicular lymph nodes, a diagnostic indicator of cancer. The prevalence of malignancy in the presence of supraclavicular lymphadenopathy is reported to be in the range of 54% to 85%.

==== Oral–antral communication ====
A variant of the Valsalva maneuver is used to aid diagnosis of oral–antral communication, i.e., the existence of a connection between the oral cavity and the maxillary sinus.

==== Urogenital medicine ====
The Valsalva maneuver is used to aid in the diagnosis of intrinsic sphincteric deficiency (ISD) in urodynamic tests. Valsalva leak point pressure is the minimum vesicular pressure associated with urine leakage. Although there is no consensus on the threshold value, values > 60 cm H_{2}O are commonly considered to indicate hypermobility of the bladder neck and normal sphincter function. Also, when examining women with pelvic organ prolapse, asking the patient to perform the Valsalva maneuver is used to demonstrate maximum pelvic organ descent.

== Complications ==
The Valsalva maneuver is relatively safe, and side effects are rare. Yet, complications include Valsalva retinopathy in susceptible patients. There are also reports of syncope, chest pain, and arrhythmias due to the performance of the maneuver, so caution is necessary for patients with preexisting coronary artery disease, valvular heart disease, or congenital heart defects.

=== Preretinal ===
Valsalva retinopathy is pathological syndrome associated with the Valsalva maneuver. It presents as preretinal hemorrhage (bleeding in front of the retina) in people with a history of transient increase in the intrathoracic pressure and may be associated with heavy lifting, forceful coughing, straining on the toilet, or vomiting. The bleeding may cause visual loss if it obstructs the visual axis, and patients may note floaters in their visual field. Usually, this causes no permanent visual impairments, and sight is fully restored.

== In spacesuits ==
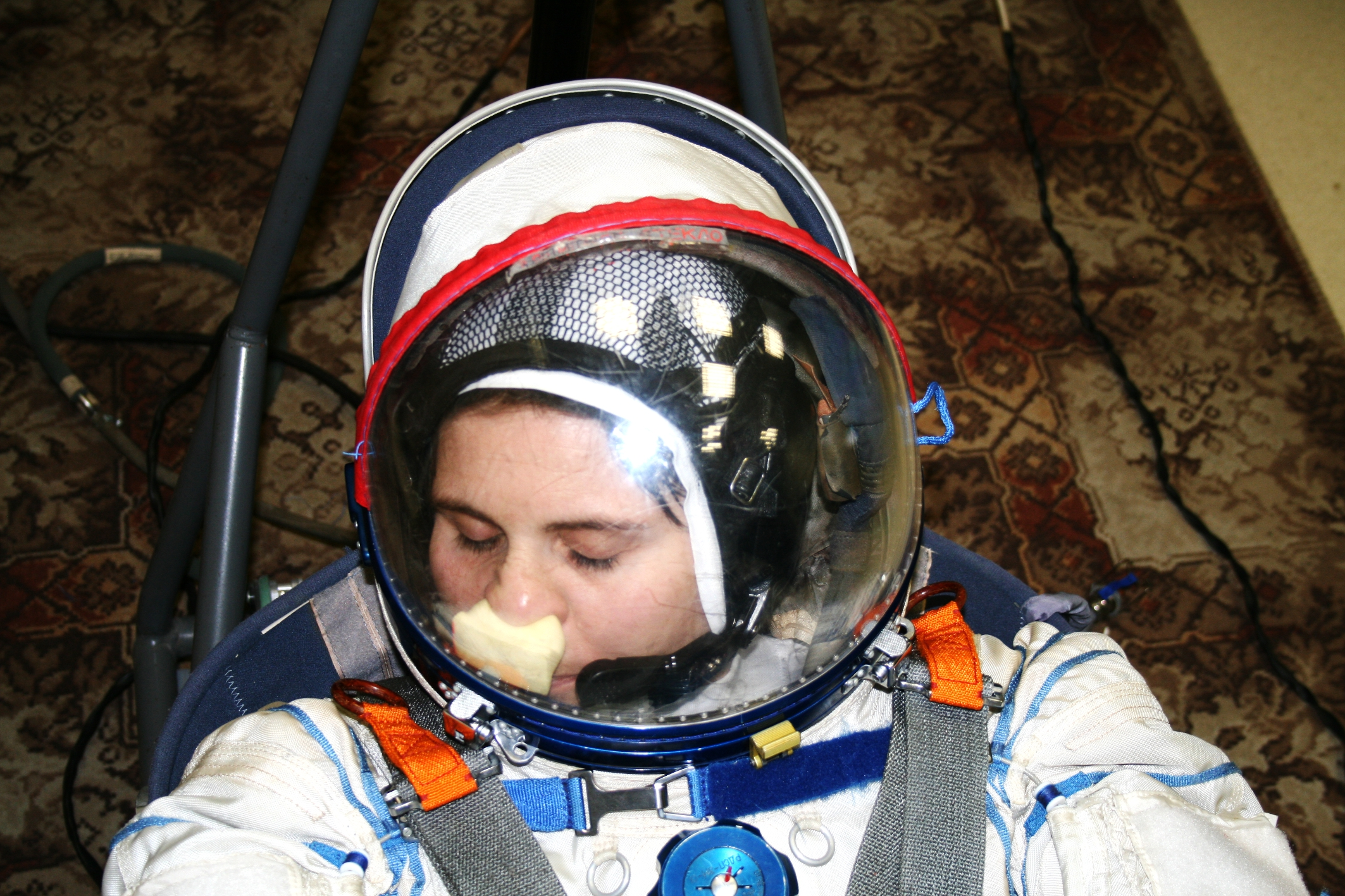
Astronaut showing the use of the Valsalva device

Some spacesuits contain a device called the Valsalva device to enable the wearer to block their nose to perform the Valsalva maneuver when wearing the suit. Astronaut Drew Feustel describes it as "a spongy device called a Valsalva that is typically used to block the nose in case a pressure readjustment is needed". One use of the device is to equalize pressure during suit pressurization.

== See also ==
- Voluntary tubal opening
- Barostriction – Obstruction of pressure equalization passages
- Ear clearing – Equalising of pressure in the middle ears
- Politzerization – Procedure to inflate the middle ear while swallowing
- Müller's maneuver – Procedure used in medicine to diagnose some types of tinnitus
- Vagal maneuver – Action used to slow down the heart rate by stimulating the vagus nerve
- Handgrip maneuver – Performed by clenching one's fist forcefully for a sustained time until fatigued
