= Valsalva retinopathy =

Retinopathy caused by intrathoracic or intra-abdominal pressure

- Specialty: Ophthalmology, Optometry
- Complications: Vitreous hemorrhage
- Causes: Intrathoracic or intra-abdominal pressure, Valsalva manoeuvre
- Diagnostic method: Ophthalmoscopy

Valsalva retinopathy is a form of retinopathy due to retinal bleeding secondary to rupture of retinal vessels caused by intrathoracic or intra-abdominal pressure due to physical activities.

== Signs and symptoms ==
The main symptom of valsalva retinopathy is painless sudden loss of vision. Sudden-onset floaters and central or paracentral visual field defects and nausea resulting from increased intraocular pressure are other symptoms.

=== Complications ===
One of the main complications of valsalva retinopathy is vitreous hemorrhage.

== Pathophysiology ==
Valsalva retinopathy is a form of sub-retinal, sub-hyaloid or sub-internal limiting membrane hemorrhage occur due to rupture of retinal vessels caused by a strenuous physical activity. Physical exertion like weight lifting and aerobic exercise, coughing, sneezing, straining at stool, vomiting, sexual intercourse, pregnancy, asthma, blowing up balloons, blowing musical instruments, cardiopulmonary resuscitation or compression injuries may cause sudden increase in intrathoracic or intra-abdominal pressure may lead to rupture of superficial retinal blood vessels. A sudden increase in venous pressure due to intrathoracic or intra-abdominal pressure cause the small perifoveal capillaries of retina to rupture, leading to premacular hemorrhage of varying intensity.

== Diagnosis ==
Patients may have a history of sudden vision loss after a strenuous physical activity. Physical examination and eye examination is needed for diagnosis of valsalava retinopathy. OCT scanning can be used to identify the location of the bleeding.

== Treatment ==
Depending on the location and extent of the bleeding, valsalva retinopathy usually resolves within weeks to months, without any complications. Patients are instructed to avoid anticoagulant drugs and physical activities which cause increase in intrathoracic or intra-abdominal pressure. For a speedy recovery, sometimes Nd:YAG laser or argon laser membranotomy may be advised.

== Epidemiology ==
As of 2022, there is currently no specific age, gender or racial preference noted for this retinopathy in the medical literature.

== History ==
Valsalva retinopathy was first described in 1972 by American ophthalmologist Thomas D. Duane.
