= Valsalva device =

Pad in headgear which blocks nose to assist ear clearing

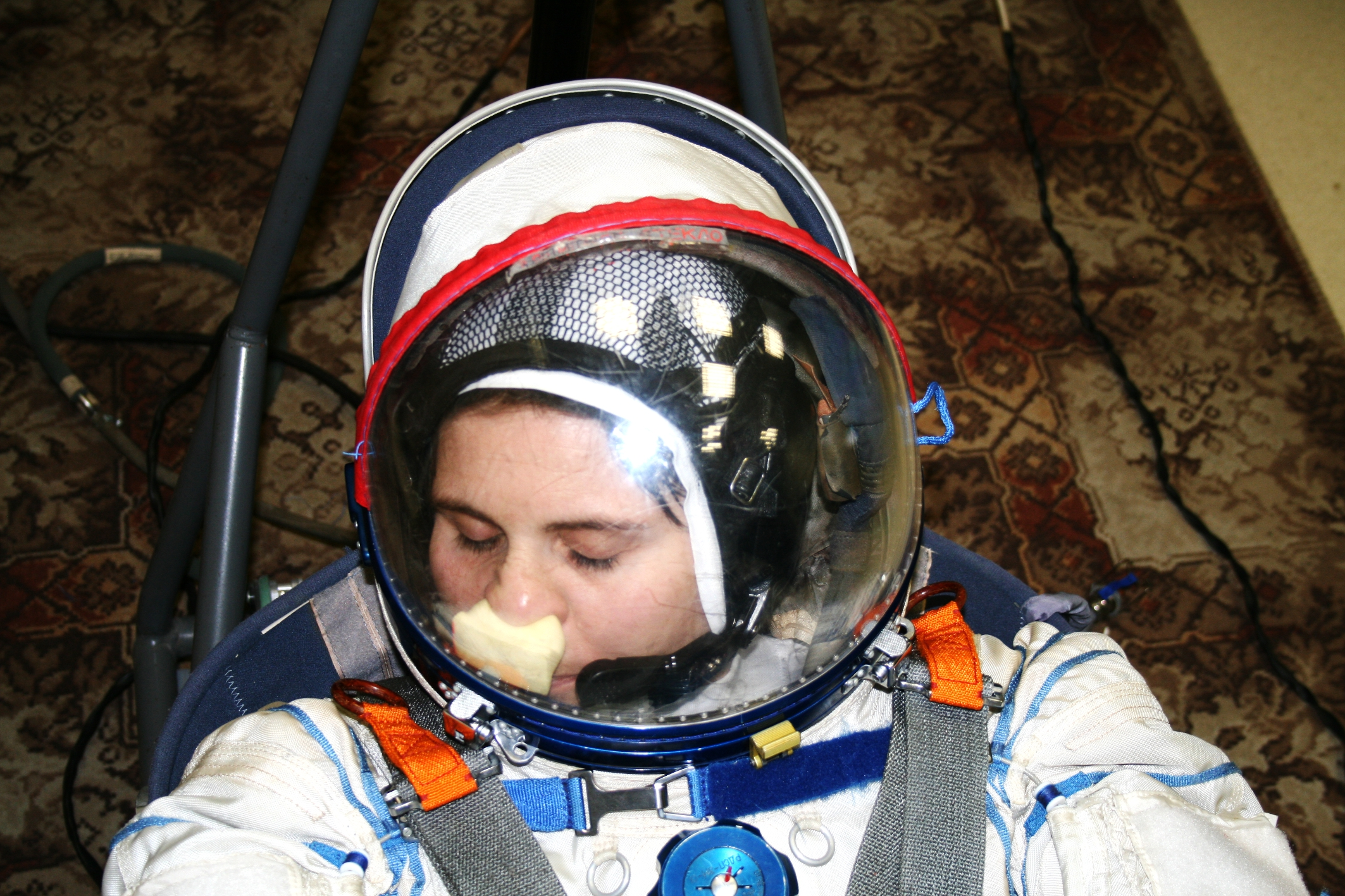
Samantha Cristoforetti demonstrating the use of the Valsalva device in the Sokol space suit

The Valsalva device is a device used in spacesuits, some full face diving masks, and diving helmets to allow astronauts and commercial divers to equalize the pressure in their ears by performing the Valsalva maneuver inside the suit without using their hands to block their nose. Astronaut Drew Feustel has described it as "a spongy device called a Valsalva that is typically used to block the nose in case a pressure readjustment is needed."

In November 2011 ESA astronaut Samantha Cristoforetti posted on Twitter a picture of her demonstrating the use of the Valsalva device in the Sokol space suit during suit pressurization.

The Valsalva device has also been used for other purposes. On 25 May 2011, NASA reported that during the second spacewalk of Space Shuttle mission STS-134, Feustel was able to clear tears from his eye by wiggling down far enough in his Extravehicular Mobility Unit to use the Valsalva device in his suit as a sponge to clear up tears caused because anti-fogging agent (liquid soap) came free from the inside of the helmet and floated into his eye.

On 3 April 2001, due to a missing Valsalva device in his suit, astronaut Leland D. Melvin suffered an ear injury while training in the Neutral Buoyancy Laboratory at Johnson Space Center.

On 16 July 2013, EVA-23 was cut short as the helmet of Luca Parmitano's Extravehicular Mobility Unit suit started filling with water. After the spacewalk, during rapid repressurization of the airlock, the Valsalva device on Parmitano's helmet failed and came apart while he tried to use it as it was not water proof.
