= Ercole Lelli =

Italian painter

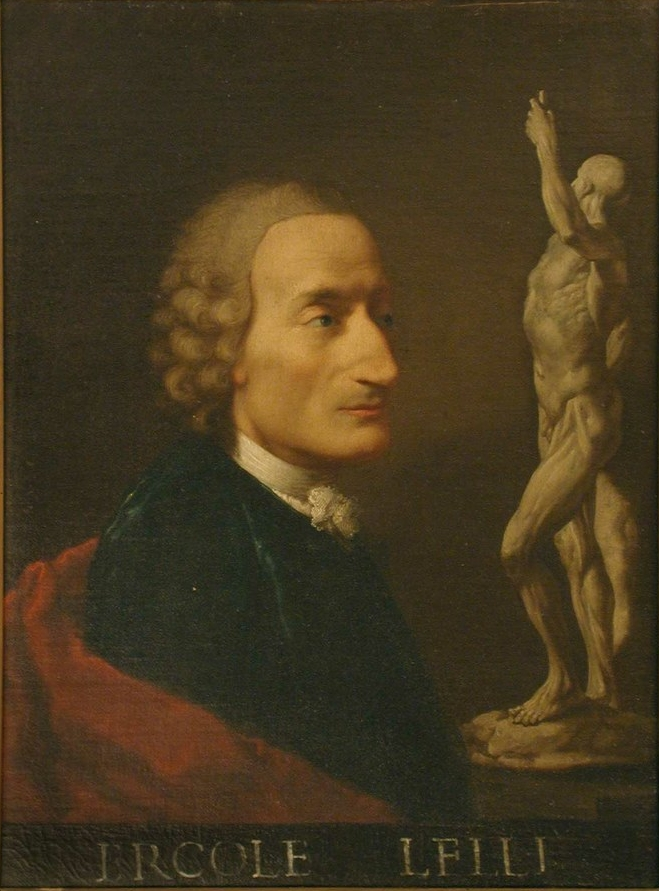
- Ercole Lelli, Self-portrait, oil on canvas
- Born: 14 September 1702; Bologna
- Died: 7 March 1766 (aged 63); Bologna
- Occupations: Painter and sculptor

Ercole Lelli (14 September 1702 – 7 March 1766) was an Italian painter and sculptor of the late-Baroque, active mainly in Northern Italy, including his native city of Bologna, as well as Padua and Piacenza. He became noted for his anatomical sculpture and art.

== Life ==
=== Early life and education ===
Lelli was a pupil of the painter Giovanni Pietro Zanotti, but he also gravitated towards sculptural work. He excelled in the study of the anatomy of the human body as well as painting. He studied engraving with Giovanni Gioseffo dal Sole and architecture with Ferdinando Galli-Bibiena. In 1727 he won the Marsili prize offered by the Accademia Clementina of Bologna with his drawing of Judith and Holofernes. This success enabled him to begin a career as a painter and sculptor. His paintings, few of which can be traced, include a Self-portrait (University of Bologna); a portrait of Eustachio Manfredi (University of Bologna, Istituto delle Scienze) is an example of his work as a sculptor.

=== Career ===
In 1732 Lelli began to study anatomy, and in 1734 he signed and dated the two wooden statues that support the cathedra in the anatomical theatre of the Archiginnasio, Bologna. In the same year Lelli was appointed coin maker, and completed many medals for the local Mint.

In 1742 he joined the Accademia Clementina, where he obtained important posts, including that of Principe (1746–7 and 1753–4). During these years he was commissioned to produce anatomical wax displays for the University of Bologna. The wax modeler and anatomist Giovanni Manzolini worked as his assistant from 1743. Manzolini resigned in late 1746 after three years. He felt bitterly that Lelli had deprived him of recognition for his greater knowledge of anatomy and anatomical sculpture. Nicolo Toselli was another of Lelli's pupils. Lelli was also active as a restorer, and was involved, for example, in the restoration of Giambologna's Fountain of Neptune, Bologna.

In 1746 Lelli became a member of both the Bolognese art society, Accademia Clementina, and the science society, Istituto delle scienze. A few pictures are extant, including a Virgin and child with St. Anthony of Padua and St. Clara for the church of Sant' Andrea delle Scuole at Bologna; and a St. Fidèle for the church of the Cappuccini at Piacenza. He was an eminent teacher of design, and in 1759 became director of the academy at Bologna, the city where he died. He has also left some engravings, such as Hagar and Ishmael. A posthumous book with a few engravings, titled Anatomia esterna del corpo umano (External Anatomy of the Human Body) was published in Bologna.

== Notable students ==
- Giles Hussey
