= Academy of Sciences of the Institute of Bologna =

Academic society in Bologna, Italy

Coordinates: 44.4967°N 11.352001°E

- Accademia delle Scienze dell'Istituto di Bologna
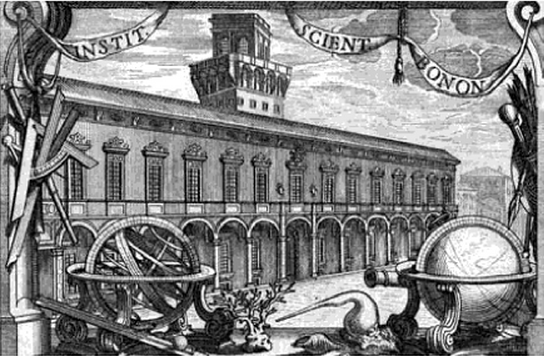
- Seventeenth century engraving of the Institute in the Palazzo Poggi
- Type: Academy of Science
- Established: 1690; 336 years ago
- Affiliations: University of Bologna
- Chairman: Professor Illio Galligani
- Chancellor: Doctor Massimo Zini
- Location: Bologna, Italy
- Website: www.accademiascienzebologna.it

The Academy of Sciences of the Institute of Bologna (Accademia delle Scienze dell'Istituto di Bologna) is an academic society in Bologna, Italy, that was founded in 1690 (1714?) and prospered in the Age of Enlightenment. Today it is closely associated with the University of Bologna.

== Origins ==
By the end of the seventeenth century the University of Bologna, the world's oldest university and once a thriving center of artistic and scientific discovery, had entered a long period of decline. The Academy degli Inquieti was founded in Bologna around 1690 by Eustachio Manfredi as a place where mathematical topics could be discussed. At first, the academy held its meetings in Manfredi's house, where it began to attract scholars working in other disciplines such as anatomy and physiology, from Bologna and from nearby provinces. In 1694 the academy moved to the house of Jacopo Sandri, a professor of anatomy and medicine at the University of Bologna. In 1704 the academy acquired a more formal structure with the appointment of a president and a secretary.

In 1705 the academy moved again to the palazzo of Conte Luigi Ferdinando Marsigli. Marsigli was a polymath, widely seen as the founder of the sciences of oceanography and marine geology. His ambition, never fulfilled, was to complete his Treatise on the Structure of the Earthy Globe, of which about 200 sheets have been preserved in the University of Bologna's library. Marsigli's goal with the institute was to gather all modern scientific knowledge within the rooms of an old senatorial residence, the Palazzo Poggi.

A constitution for the Institute of Science was approved on 12 December 1711. In 1712 Marsigli donated his museum to the city of Bologna, and it was moved to the Palazzo Poggi.

== Early years ==
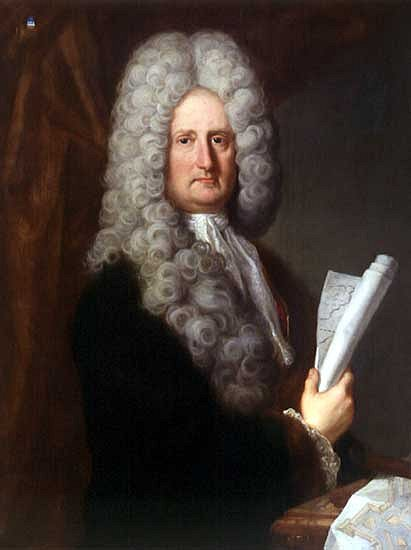
Luigi Ferdinando Marsigli, the founder of the Institute

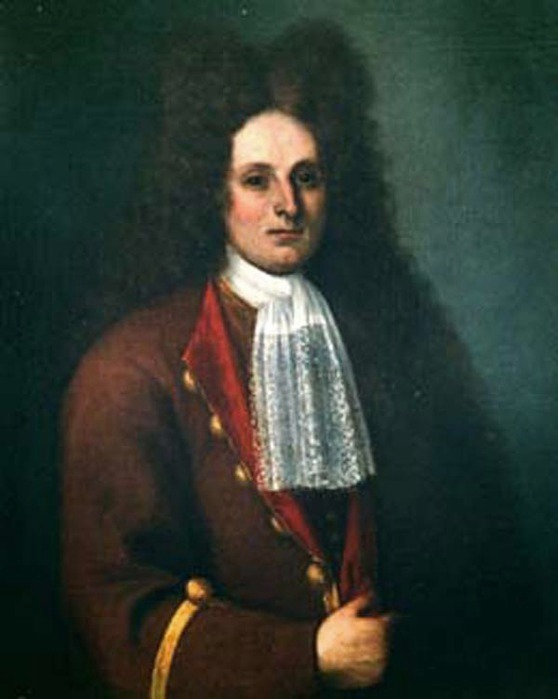
Jacopo Riccati, who introduced the Riccati equation and was regarded as one of the most influential mathematicians of the 2nd millennium

The Accademia delle Scienze dell'Istituto di Bologna was formally inaugurated in 1714, and the Accademia degli Inquieti merged into it. Marsigli had also founded an Academy of Fine Arts in his house for painting, sculpture and architecture. The Senate allowed him to join this academy, the Accademia di Belle Arti di Bologna, to the Science Academy. Pope Clement XI was a strong supporter of the Fine Arts Academy and supplied it with its statutes. The Arts Academy was sometimes called the Accademia Clementina di Bologna in his honor. The Accademia Clementina was on the first floor of the Institute in the Palazzo Poggi, the Accademia delle Scienze on the second floor and the observatory on the third floor.

The science academy initially had five professorial chairs. Marsigli's vision was that the Accademia delle Scienze would carry out scientific research in the tradition of Galileo and Newton. At first, the institute did not come up to Marsigli's expectations. He found that it was used only as a place for intellectual entertainment, a place to show off to visitors to the city, and few people attended the lectures or scientific demonstrations. In 1723 a serious conflict arose between Marsigli, who had largely funded the institute, and the Senate of Bologna, who were in charge of it. The Senate had not, in Marsigli's view, met the conditions of his donation. With pressure from the Pope, the issues were temporarily resolved to Marsigli's satisfaction in 1726, but his enemies continued to be obstructive, and in 1728 Marsigli abandoned his project in disgust. Marsigli died in 1730.

Various changes and additions were made to the two-story Palazzo Poggi to accommodate the needs of the institute. The Astronomical Observatory Tower (Specola) was built in 1725 to a design by Carlo Francesco Dotti. Laboratories, galleries and workshops were set up, and the institute became a research facility as well as a venue for exchanging information. In 1727 Marsigli transferred his collection of materials from the Dutch East and West Indies to the institute. The institute published its first volume of Proceedings in 1731, three volumes between 1745 and 1747, and five more volumes before the end of the eighteenth century. The institute helped pull Bologna out of its provincial isolation, reengaging with centers such as the French Academy of Sciences and the British Royal Society.

== Age of Enlightenment ==
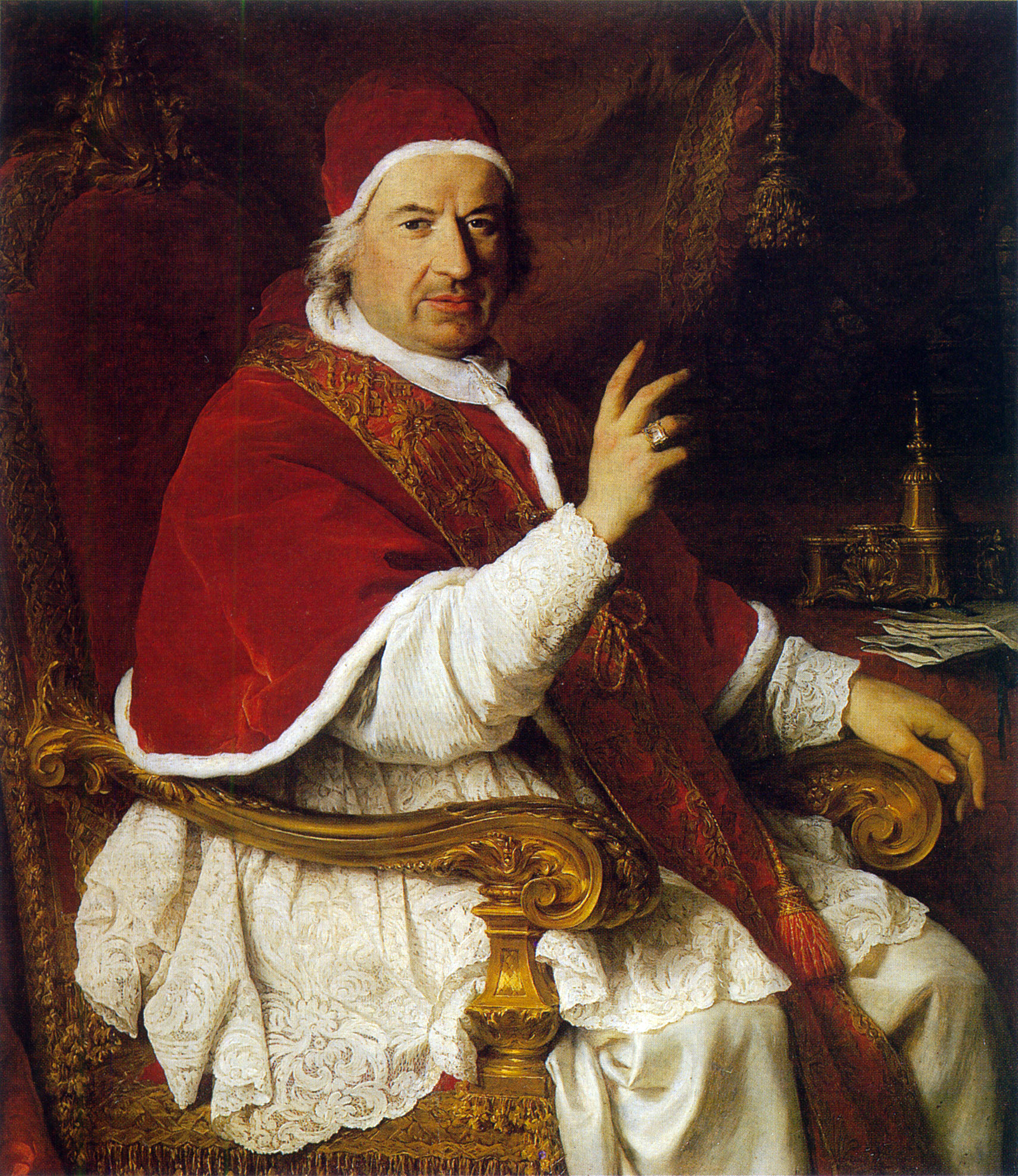
Pope Benedict XIV was a major benefactor of the institute.

Prospero Lambertini, archbishop of Bologna and later Pope Benedict XIV, was a strong supporter of the institute. Elected Pope in 1741, he arranged for purchase of astronomical instruments for the Specola observatory from Jonathan Sisson of London. He launched a major project to reorganize the library of the Istituto delle Scienze e della Arti, building the "Benedictine" wing of the Aula Magna reading room, now part of the university library. The collections and library of the Ulisse Aldrovandi (1522–1605), the natural historian, were transferred from the university to the institute. The influence of Aldrovandi may be seen in the "liberal Diluvianism (Note: "Diluvianism" is the belief that at some time in the past a devastating flood had swept the earth, as described in the Bible, and that this played a major role in shaping the Earth. In his later life, Marsigli withdrew from this position.)" of the institute's scientists at this time, who believed in a "balanced integration of science, philosophy and religion." In 1742 Ercole Lelli was asked to supply wax anatomical models for the institute's Museum of Anatomy. In 1743 the institute obtained the donation of the Naturalia Museum collection of natural objects that had been assembled by Senator Ferdinando Cospi.

In 1744 the advice of Pieter van Musschenbroek and Willem 's Gravesande was sought in acquiring instruments from the Netherlands to teach and explore the theories of Galileo and Newton. In 1745 the institute opened a Gabinetto di Fisica, a room that held a museum and a laboratory for exploring physics. The entire workshop of the optical instrument maker Giuseppe Campani (1635–1715) was donated to the Gabinetto di Fisica in 1747. Additional funds were supplied to improve the chemical laboratories and support the Professor of Chemistry. In 1754 Cardinal Filippo Maria Monti gave the institute his 12,000-volume library and a collection of paintings that included portraits of major scientific figures. The library was formally opened in 1756. In 1757 Giovanni Antonio Galli was made Professor of Obstetrics, and the next year the Pope overrode opposition and established a school of obstetrics at the institute.

After the reforms by Pope Benedict XIV, the Science Academy became a center for all who wanted to advance sciences in Bologna. A new interest arose in the theories of Marcello Malpighi, René Descartes and Isaac Newton, and in the teachings of Nicolaus Copernicus, Galileo Galilei and Francis Bacon, as well as interest in social issues. The physicist Laura Bassi, who in 1732 had become the second European woman to be awarded a university degree, became a member of the institute where she presented annual papers such as her 1746 On the compression of air. Another early female member was Émilie du Châtelet. The chemist Bartolomeo Beccari looked for ways to make populations resistant to famine through a new type of emergency diet. The academy reached a high level of scientific progress towards the end of the eighteenth century under its President Luigi Galvani. In 1791 he published his revolutionary treaty de viribus electricitatis in motu musculari ("Commentary on the Force of Electricity on Muscular Motion").

== Later history ==
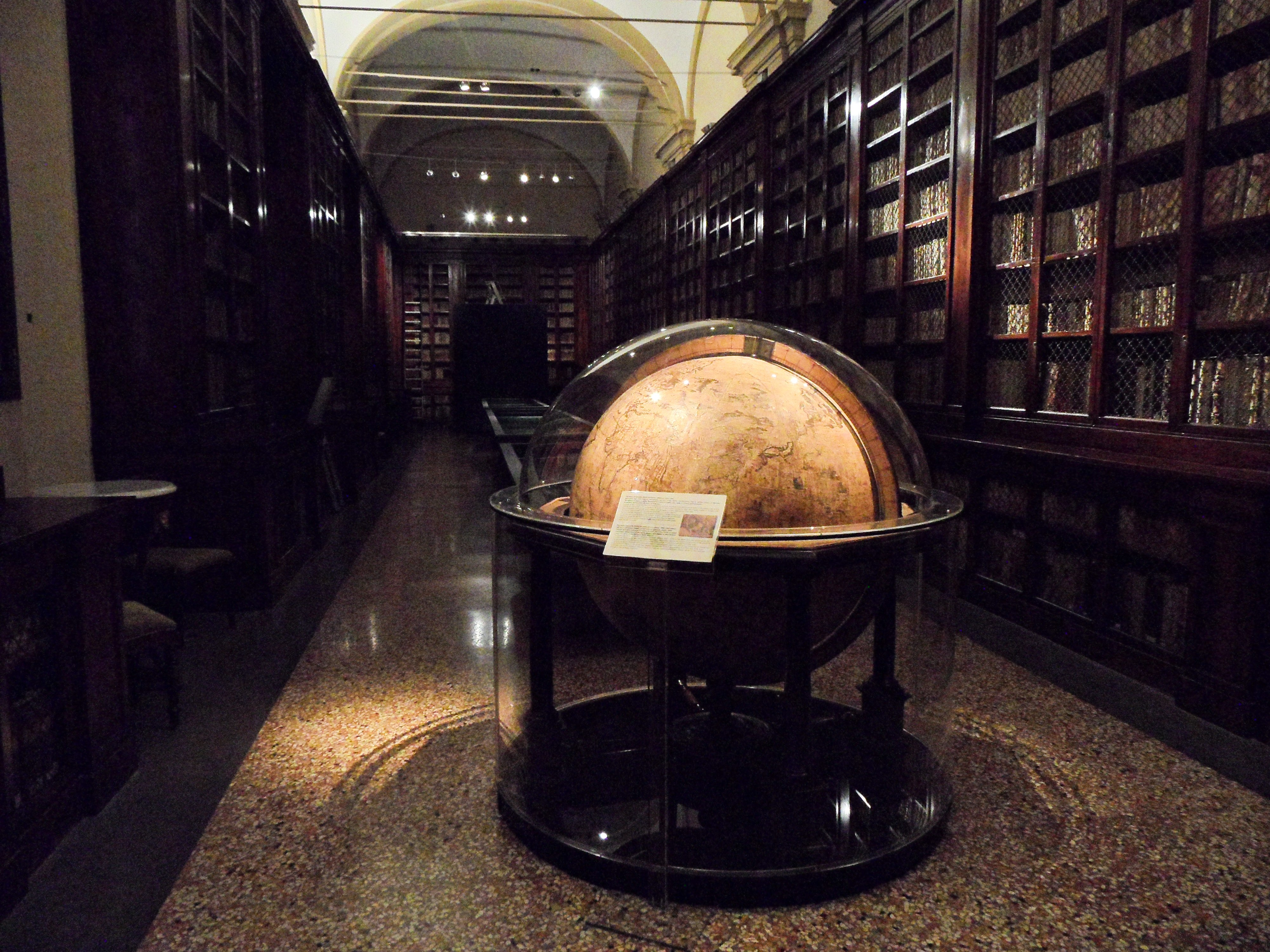
Seventeenth century globe in the Palazzo Poggi

The Napoleonic period caused great upheavals. Around 1802 or 1803 the Accademia Clementina was dissolved, leaving only the Science Academy. In 1804 the academy was temporarily suspended. It reopened in 1829 at the command of Bartolomeo Alberto Cappellari, the future Pope Gregory XVI (Pope from 1831 to 1846), who saw the academy as the authoritative source for scientific opinions and advice to the Papal States. Pope Pius IX (Pope from 1846 to 1878) considered it an important vehicle for achieving scientific and social progress. Prominent members during those years included Antonio Alessandrini, Antonio Bertoloni, his son Giuseppe Bertoloni, Giovanni Giuseppe Bianconi, and Charles Lucien Bonaparte.

The institute experienced serious economic problems during the years that immediately followed the annexation of the Papal Legation of Bologna by the Kingdom of Italy in 1859, in which the city of Bologna lost much of its political importance. In 1883 "Royal" was added to the academy's name. This was dropped in 1945.

In the later nineteenth century and the first part of the twentieth century the academy revived and was home to many famous scientists including Francesco Rizzoli, Augusto Righi, Giovanni Capellini, Luigi Calori and Pietro Albertoni. At the start of the twentieth century there was a move to establish a new faculty of human sciences, led by scholars such as Giosuè Carducci and Giovanni Pascoli. In 1907, the academy admitted legal scholars for the first time. Under the Fascist regime, the academy played a leading role in the new Royal Academy of Italy, due to important scholars such as Guglielmo Marconi and Alessandro Ghigi. After World War II the Academy of Italy was dissolved, and the Bologna Academy found itself again in serious financial difficulties.

== Today ==
The academy today publishes original work in the fields of the humanities and the sciences, and promotes conferences and debates. The academy cooperates with the University of Bologna to arrange seminars attended by about 1,500 academics annually. With its legacy of frescoes by Pellegrino Tibaldi, it is particularly involved in the history of art and restoration of art.

== Scientific journals ==
The academy has published several journals during its history, some of which have been digitised and are accessible online. Typically, each journal was published in a series of up to about 10 volumes, the last in each series including a general index. Those journals include:

- Annali di storia naturale, 1829–1830.
- Novi Commentarii Academiae Scientiarum Instituti Bononiensis, 1834–1849.
- Nuovi annali delle scienze naturali, 1838–1854.
- Memorie della Accademia delle Scienze dell'Istituto di Bologna, 1850 – at least 1923.
- Rendiconti delle Sessioni dell'Accademia delle Scienze dell'Istituto di Bologna, 1851–1857.

== Notes and references ==
=== Sources ===
- "Accademia delle Scienze dell'Istituto di Bologna". Scholarly Societies Project. University of Waterloo. Archived from the original on 2013-01-06.
- "Academy of Sciences". University of Bologna. Archived from the original on 2013-10-02.
- Boschiero, Luciano (2005). "Fellows' Reports" (PDF). Report on the academic year 2004–2005. Italian Academy for advanced studies in America. Archived from the original (PDF) on 2016-09-16.
- Field, J. V.; James, Frank A. J. L. (1997-10-02). Renaissance and Revolution: Humanists, Scholars, Craftsmen and Natural Philosophers in Early Modern Europe. Cambridge University Press. p. 231. ISBN 978-0-521-62754-2.
- Findlen, Paula; Roworth, Wendy Wassyng; Sama, Catherine M. (2009-01-09). Italy's Eighteenth Century: Gender and Culture in the Age of the Grand Tour. Stanford University Press. ISBN 978-0-8047-5904-5.
- "Istituto delle Scienze". Museo di Palazzo Poggi.
- Modena, Claudio; Lourenço, Paulo B.; Roca, Pere (2005). Structural Analysis of Historical Constructions: Possibilities of Numerical and Experimental Techniques. Taylor & Francis. ISBN 978-0-415-36379-2.
- Porter, Roy (2003-03-17). The Cambridge History of Science: Volume 4, Eighteenth-Century Science. Cambridge University Press. ISBN 978-0-521-57243-9.
- "Storia Accademia delle Scienze dell'istituto di Bologna". Ministero per i Beni e le Attività Culturali. Archived from the original on 2007-09-15.
- Vai, Gian Battista; Caldwell, W. G. E. (2006). The Origins of Geology in Italy. Geological Society of America. ISBN 978-0-8137-2411-9.
