= Zanotti =

Zanotti is an Italian surname. Notable people with the surname include:

- Eustachio Zanotti (1709–1782), Italian astronomer and engineer
- Fabrizio Zanotti (born 1983), Paraguayan professional golfer
- Fio Zanotti (born 1949), Italian record producer, arranger, conductor, composer and multiinstrumentalist
- Francesco Maria Zanotti (1692–1777), Italian philosopher and writer
- Gabriela Maria Zanotti Demoner (born 1983), Brazilian football player for Corinthians
- Giampietro Zanotti (1674–1765), Italian painter and art historian of the late-Baroque or Rococo period
- Giuseppe Zanotti (born 1957), Italian luxury footwear and fashion designer
- Guerrino Zanotti (born 1964), in 2014 Captain Regent of San Marino with Gianfranco Terenzi
- Juri Zanotti (born 1999), Italian cross-country mountain biker
- Luca Zanotti (born 1994), Italian football player
- Marco Zanotti (cyclist, born 1974), road bicycle racer from Italy
- Marco Zanotti (cyclist, born 1988), Italian cyclist
- Mark Zanotti (born 1964), former Australian rules footballer
- Mattia Zanotti (born 2003), Italian professional footballer
- Simone Zanotti (born 1992), Italian basketball player
- Umberto Zanotti Bianco (1889–1963), Italian archaeologist, environmentalist and lifetime senator
