= Michele Rajna =

Italian mathematician (1854–1920)

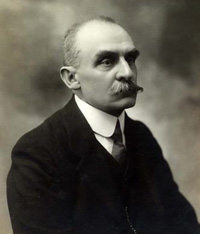
- Portrait c. 1903
- Born: September 28, 1854; Sondrio, Austrian Empire
- Died: September 29, 1920 (aged 66); Teglio, Kingdom of Italy
- Known for: Logarithm tables

Academic background
- Education: Ghislieri College; University of Pavia

Academic work
- Institutions: Brera Astronomical Observatory; Polytechnic University of Milan; University of Bologna; Observatory of Bologna
- Main interests: Geodesy; astronomy; geomagnetism; solar eclipse

Michele Rajna (September 28, 1854 – September 29, 1920) was an Italian mathematician and astronomer. He led astronomy at the University of Bologna for nearly two decades, publishing studies of eclipses, Earth's magnetic field, and geodetic astronomy. He was the director of the Observatory of Bologna from 1903 until his death.

== Early life and education ==
Rajna was born in Sondrio, a city in the Kingdom of Lombardy–Venetia in the Austrian Empire, in 1854. He was the second-born son of Eugenio Paolo Rajna and Costanza Simonetta. His older brother Pio Rajna, born 1847, was an Italian philologist and literary critic who later served in the Senate of the Kingdom of Italy.

He attended Ghislieri College in Pavia, where he studied under astronomer Giovanni Schiaparelli at the Brera Astronomical Observatory. Rajna attended the University of Pavia, graduating with a doctorate in mathematics in 1878.

== Career ==
Upon graduating from the University of Pavia, Rajna joined the Brera Astronomical Observatory in 1878. In 1882, he was appointed Third Astronomer at the observatory and recognized for his mathematical work on Cartesian coordinate calculation by an invitation to join the Italian Geodetic Commission. He became a lecturer in astronomy and geodesy at the Polytechnic University of Milan in 1890. Wishing to remain in Milan, in 1897 he rejected an offer to chair the astronomy department at the University of Palermo.

Rajna became chair of astronomy at the University of Bologna in 1903. He wrote a letter supporting the Vatican Observatory in 1907. He directed the Observatory of Bologna until his death, attempting unsuccessfully to have it transferred to Villa Aldini, a more suitable position on a nearby hill. A branch was later built in Loiano in 1933 by his successor, Guido Horn d'Arturo.

Rajna's work focused primarily on geodetic astronomy and the influence of solar activity on Earth's magnetic field. He found a method to graphically predict solar eclipses in 1891. He published a volume of logarithm tables to five decimals with Otto Müller through Hoepli Editore in 1883 which became one of the most commonly used computational aids in Italy for decades. It was republished in 1886 and again in 1891. Rajna also published a volume calculating the true geographical local time of any place in Italy. He was a member of the Italian National Academy.

After frequent periods of depression and illness, Rajna died on September 20, 1920, in Teglio, Italy.
