= Francesco Ubertini =

Francesco Ubertini may refer to:

- Francesco Bacchiacca (1494–1557), Italian painter
- Francesco Ubertini (engineer) (born 1970), rector of the University of Bologna
