= Francesco Maria Zanotti =

Italian philosopher and writer (1692–1777)

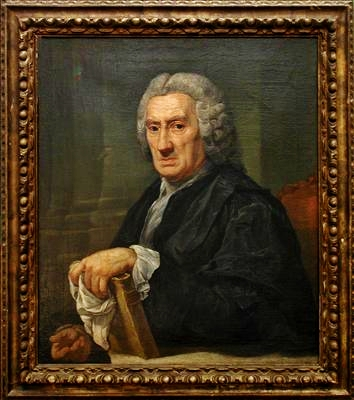
- Born: 6 January 1692; Bologna, Papal States
- Died: 25 December 1777 (aged 85); Bologna, Papal States

Academic work
- Discipline: philosophy
- Institutions: University of Bologna
- Notable works: La forza attrattiva delle idee

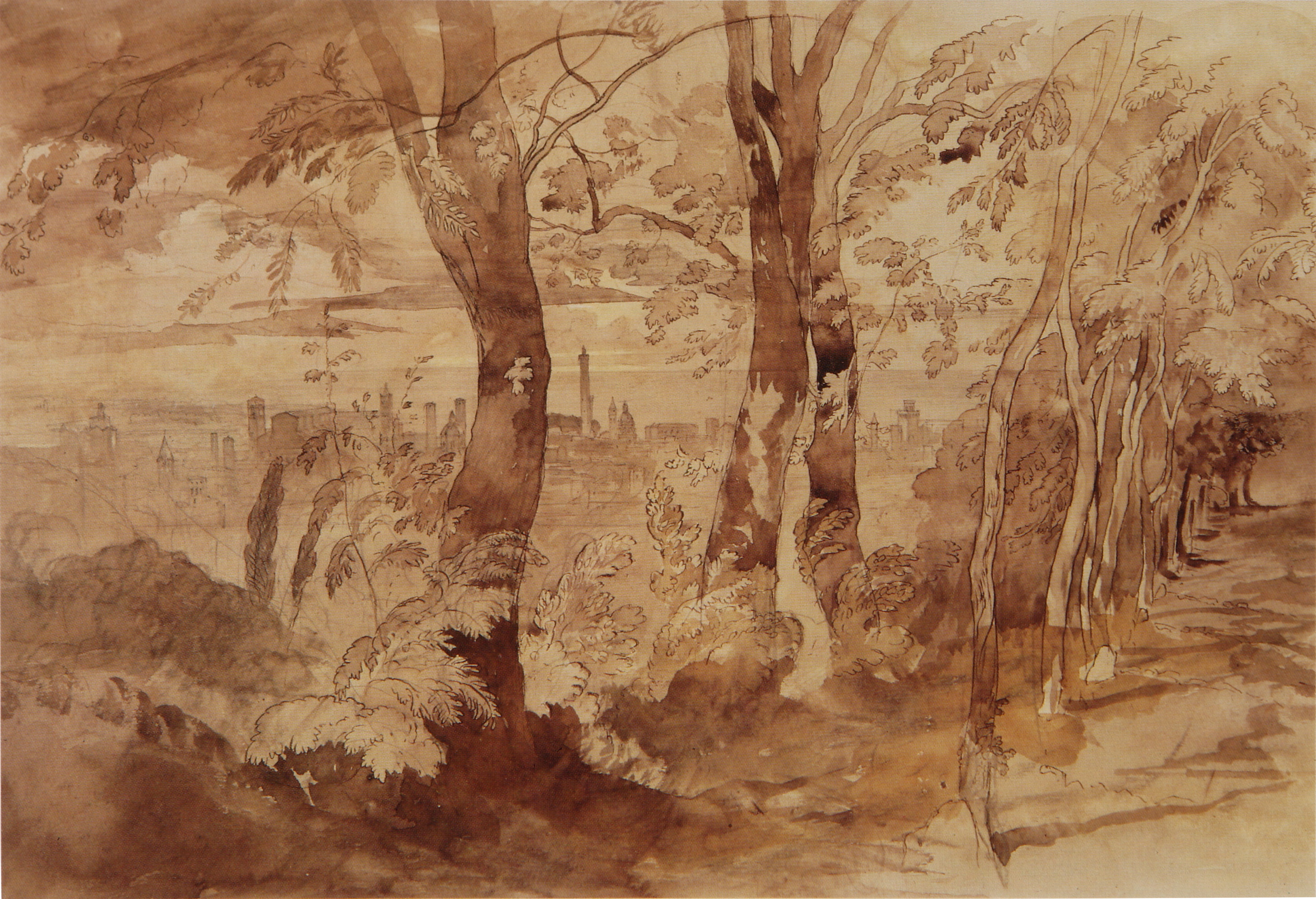
View of Bologna

Francesco Maria Zanotti Cavazzoni (Bologna, 6 January 1692 – Bologna, 25 December 1777) was an Italian philosopher and writer. Besides being a writer, he was also a commentator on works of art. He was considered an authoritative source on many topics.

== Life ==
He was a pupil of Eustachio Manfredi. In 1718, he became professor of philosophy at the University of Bologna, and in 1723 he was appointed as secretary of Luigi Ferdinando Marsigli. Initially a Cartesian, he became a follower of Newton. In 1728 Francesco Algarotti experimented with light in his lab, replicating the prism and spectrum experiments of Isaac Newton. In 1741 he became a Fellow of the Royal Society.

Zanotti's 1741 essay on the 'attractive force of ideas' defended a view of the association of ideas influenced by Newtonian physics. In 1754 Zanotti criticised Pierre-Louis Maupertuis for his views on Stoicism and Christianity, and was drawn into controversy about Stoicism with the Dominican professor Casto Innocenzio Ansaldi.

In 1766 he became president of Institute of Science in Bologna. In 1775, Benjamin Wilson began a correspondence with Zanotti on phosphor.

== Family ==
His brother, Giampietro Cavazzoni Zanotti was a writer, painter, and art historian; Eustachio Zanotti was a famous astronomer and hydraulic engineer. His nephew was the philosopher and writer Manuel Lassala.

== Works ==
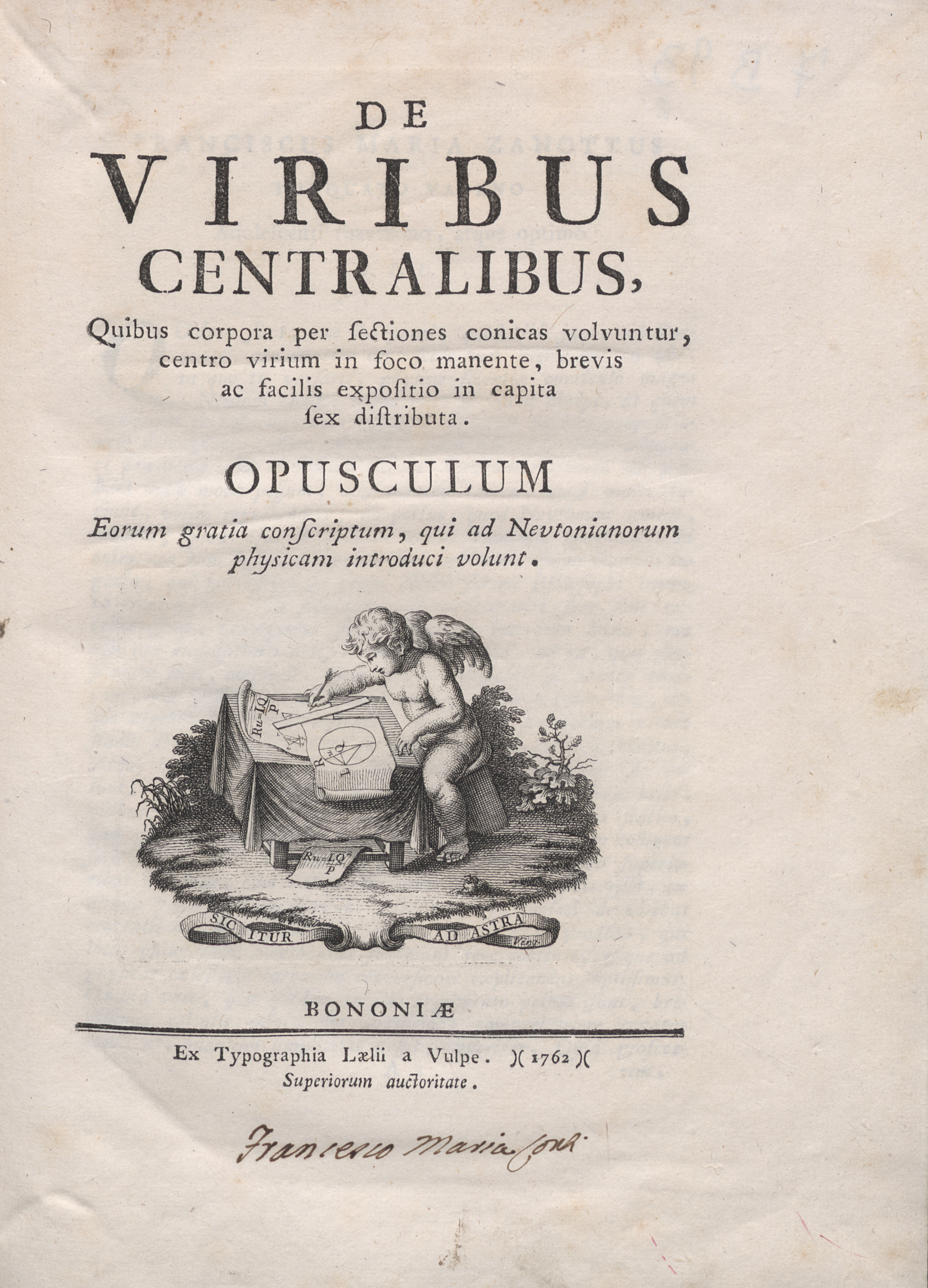
De viribus centralibus

- La forza attrattiva delle idee (1747)
- La filosofia morale secondo i peripatetici (1754)
- Dell'arte poetica (1758)
- Lettere famigliari in difesa della Felsina Pittrice
- Delle lodi delle belle arti
- Dialogo in difesa di G. Reni
- De viribus centralibus (in Latin). Bologna: Lelio Dalla Volpe. 1762.

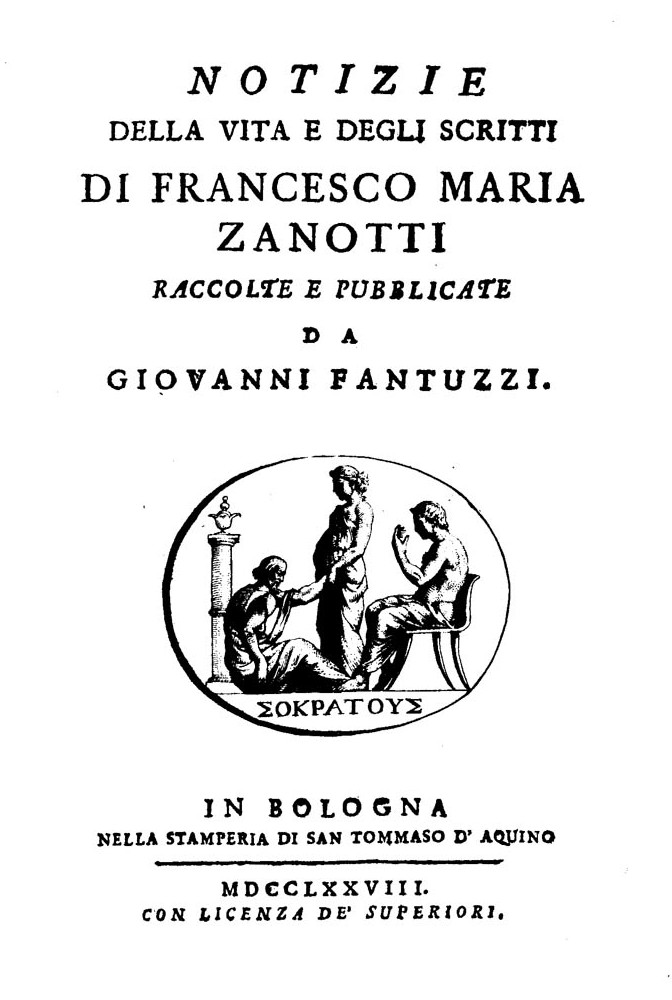
Giovanni Fantuzzi, Notizie della vita e degli scritti di Francesco Maria Zanotti, 1778
