= Zanotto =

Zanotto is a surname. Notable people with the surname include:

- Deone Zanotto, Australian actress, singer and dancer
- Edgar D. Zanotto, Brazilian engineer
- Juan Zanotto (1935–2005), Argentine comic book artist
- Kendra Zanotto (born 1981), American swimmer

== See also ==
- Zanotti
