= Observatory of Bologna =

Astronomical observatory in Bologna, Italy

- Alternative names: Bologna Astronomical Observatory
- Organization: National Institute for Astrophysics
- Observatory code: 598
- Location: Bologna, Italy
- Coordinates: 44.500833°N 11.356944°E
- Altitude: 48 metres (157 ft)
- Established: 1726
- Website: www.oas.inaf.it/en/
- Telescopes: Osservatorio astronomico di Loiano

The Observatory of Bologna is an astronomical observatory in Bologna, Italy. Built in 1726, it was the first public observatory in Italy. It is one of twenty facilities comprising the National Institute for Astrophysics.

== History ==
In 1711, Luigi Ferdinando Marsili persuaded Pope Clement XI and the Senate of Bologna to provide funds to establish a building for the Institute of Sciences at the University of Bologna. He presented the Pope with eight paintings by Donato Creti depicting novel telescopes and astronomical observations of the planets. Pope Clement was reportedly delighted with the gift and sanctioned funding for the observatory. The paintings remain in the Vatican Museums.

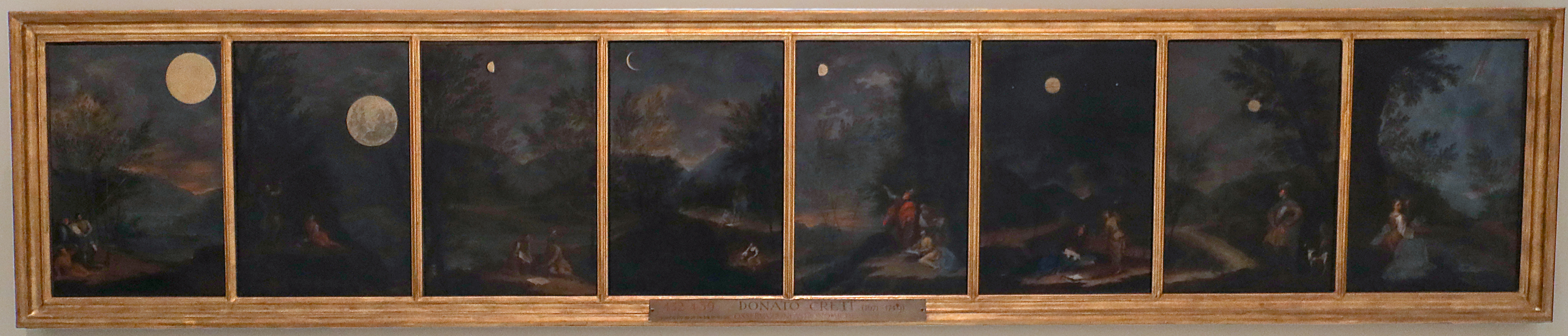
Paintings by Donato Creti (1711)

The senate chose the Palazzo Poggi palace for the site, and an astronomical observatory was built, called the Torre della Specola (Observatory Tower). Construction began in 1712 under the architect Giuseppe Antonio Torri and lasted fourteen years. The observatory was completed in 1726.

Eustachio Manfredi became first director of the observatory until his death in 1739. There, he studied the parallax of fixed stars and discovered aberration ten years before James Bradley. He was succeeded as director by Eustachio Zanotti and later Petronio Matteucci, who started meteorological surveys that continue to present.

In 1790, Giovanni Battista Guglielmini dropped lead spheres from the top of the 29 meter (95 ft) tall observatory tower and measured an eastward deflection of 4.5 mm, demonstrating Earth's rotation. He repeated the experiment of Coriolis force from the Torre degli Asinelli.

The Palazzo Poggi in which the observatory was located served as the headquarters for the University of Bologna for more than three centuries. In 1734, the Observatory of Pisa was established, modeled on that of Bologna. The original observatory tower was demolished in 1826 because of structural stability issues and ground unsteadiness.

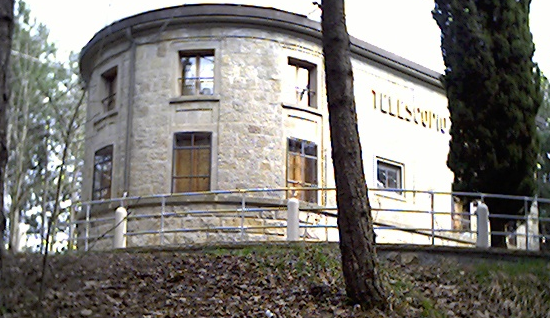
Dome of the astronomical observatory in Loiano

Publication of astronomical ephemerides ceased in 1844 after more than a century of continuous publication. The observatory shifted to performing meteorological monitoring. In 1903, astronomical observation resumed with the appointment of Michele Rajna as director. A new observatory was inaugurated in Loiano under Guido Horn d'Arturo to accommodate large modern instruments. There, physicists such as Luigi Giuseppe Jacchia began systematic observations of meteors and dynamics of the upper atmosphere.

== Instruments ==
Initially, instruments were sourced from a private observatory in Marseille. Others were donated by Bolognese prelates of the Catholic Church: a 4-meter telescope, quadrant, clock, and reflecting telescope modeled after that of Isaac Newton were donated by Cardinal Gianantonio Davia, while Cardinal Sebastiano Antonio Tanara donated a telescope with 6.5 meter focal distance.

In 1739, more precise instruments were purchased from England, including a mural dial, transit telescope, and movable quadrant.

== Directors ==
- Eustachio Manfredi (1726–1739)
- Eustachio Zanotti (1739–1782)
- Petronio Matteucci (1782–1801)
- Lorenzo Respighi (1855–1864)
- Michele Rajna (c. 1900s)
- Guido Horn d'Arturo (1921–1954)

== See also ==
- List of observatory codes
