= Francesco Ubertini (engineer) =

Italian engineer and academic

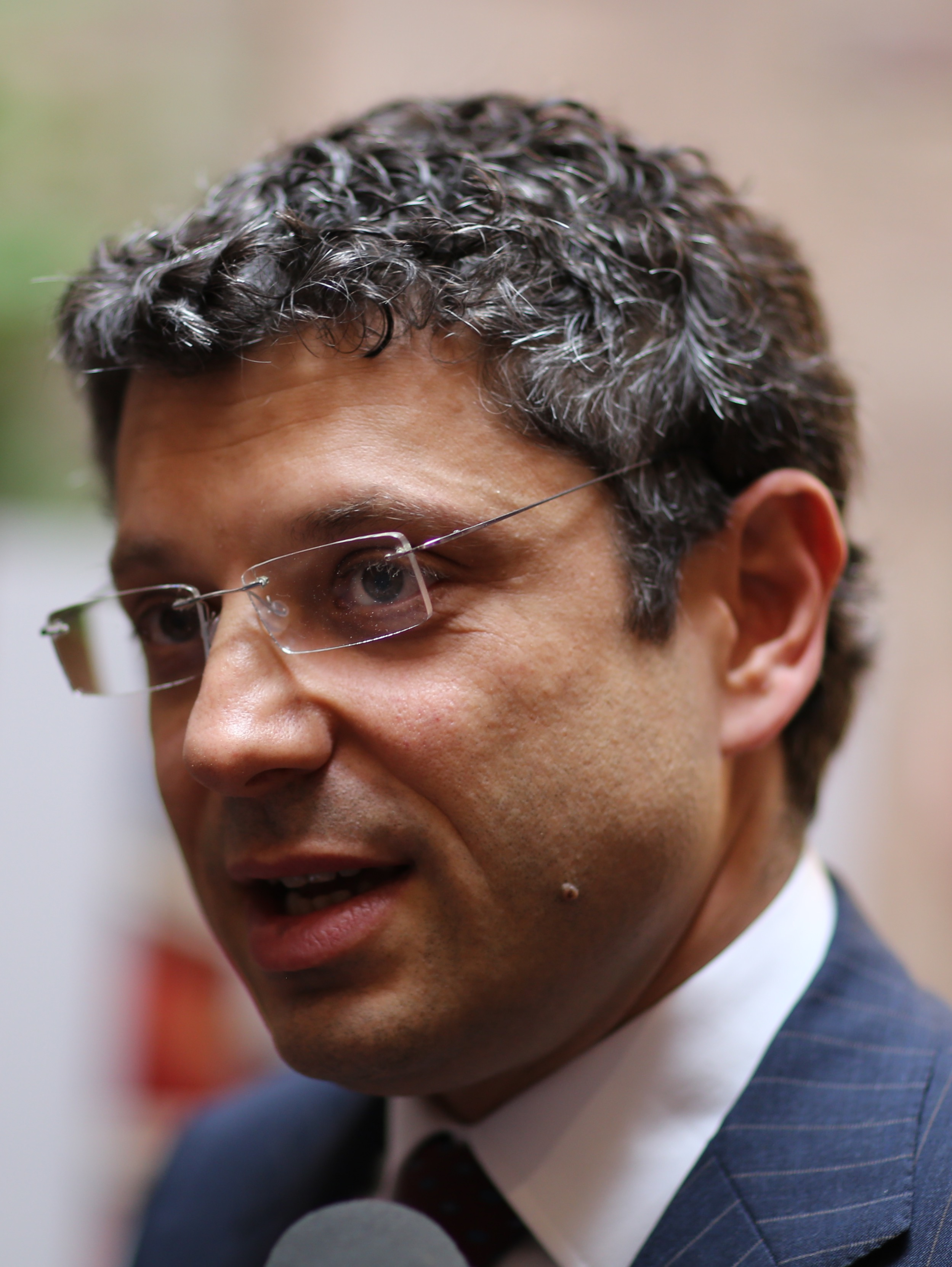

Rector of the University of Bologna
- In office 1 November 2015 – 1 November 2021
- Preceded by: Ivano Dionigi
- Succeeded by: Giovanni Molari

Personal details
- Born: February 6, 1970 (age 56) Perugia, Italy
- Profession: Engineer, professor

Francesco Ubertini is an Italian engineer and professor of mechanics of solids and structures at the University of Bologna.

He served as Head Rector of the Alma Mater Studiorum - University of Bologna from 2015 to 2021.

== Education ==
He graduated in Civil Engineering at the University of Bologna, where he was subsequently awarded a PhD in Structural Mechanics. Since 2007 he has been professor of mechanics of solids and structures in the School of Architecture and Engineering of the Alma Mater Studiorum - University of Bologna.

He was head of the Department of Structural, Transport, Hydraulic, Survey and Territory Engineering (DISTART) from 2007 to 2010 and of the Department of Civil, Chemical, Environmental and Materials Engineering (DICAM) from 2010 to 2015.

Since 2015 he has been a member of the Academy of Sciences of the Institute of Bologna and has been a member of the Observatory of the Magna Charta Universitatum Council for the period 2016–2020.

In July 2015 he was elected Rector of the University of Bologna, a position he has held from 1 November 2015 to October 2021.

Among his current positions, he is President of CINECA, president of the International Foundation Big Data and Artificial Intelligence for Human Development (IFAB), Vice-president The National Research Centre in High Performance Computing, Big Data and Quantum Computing ICSC, board member of European University Association and member of the Academy of Science of Bologna Institute.

Among his previous positions, he was president of the Tech University School (Fondazione Scuola Universitaria per le professioni tecniche - Emilia Romagna) SUPER; President of the Zeri Foundation, President of the Bologna Business School Foundation, member of the Council of the Magna Charta Observatory, and of Fibra - Fondazione culturale Italo Brasiliana, member of the Board of Directors of the Ceramic Center, President of UniAdrion (2017–2018), President of Bononia University Press, member of the Technical Committee on Computational Solid and Structural Mechanics, European Community on Computational Methods in Applied Sciences and member of the Steering Committee of the Italian Group of Computational Mechanics (GIMC).

In May 2016 he was awarded the Thomas Hart Benton Mural Medallion by the President of Indiana University in recognition of the 50th anniversary of the Bologna Consortial Studies Program. In the same year his name was included in the Gold Register of the City of Perugia. In 2021 he was awarded the Turrita d'Argento by the Mayor of the city of Bologna.

== Research ==
The main research themes pursued in his scientific studies are in the field of Mechanics of Solids and Structures: numerical modelling and structural analysis, intelligent structures and innovative materials, historical and archaeological structures, structural monitoring and diagnostics.

He has participated in various ways in numerous European and Italian projects. He has both chaired and been a member of the organising and scientific committees at a number of Italian and international conferences and is on the editorial committees of several international journals.

He is also expert auditor for the Italian Ministry of Education and Research MIUR, for national agencies of other countries and for the European Commission.

== Publications ==
He is the author of numerous publications: over 70 in international journals and over 200 conference papers.

Academic offices
Preceded by Ivano Dionigi	Rector of the University of Bologna; 1 November 2015 – present	Succeeded by N/A (incumbent)
