= Giovanni Molari =

Rector of the University of Bologna

Rector of the University of Bologna
- Incumbent
- Assumed office 1 November 2021
- Preceded by: Francesco Ubertini

Personal details
- Born: 11 October 1973 (age 52) Bologna, Italy
- Profession: Engineer, academic

Giovanni Molari (born 11 October 1973) is an Italian engineer and academic, whose research has focused on mechanised agriculture and livestock machinery. He has served as rector of the University of Bologna since 1 November 2021.

== Biography and education ==
Molari graduated in mechanical engineering at the University of Bologna in October 1998, with the academic supervision of Francesco Profumo (who would later be appointed Italy's Minister of Education in the Monti Cabinet). Two months later, in December 1998, he qualified as a professional engineer.

In 2003 he earned a PhD in materials engineering at the University of Modena and Reggio Emilia, combining his studies with his work as a university researcher. In 2010 he became associate professor in the Department of Agri-food Sciences and Technologies at the University of Bologna. He was later promoted to the post of director in 2018. In 2016 he became full professor of agricultural mechanics at the University of Bologna.

In June 2021 Molari was elected rector of the University of Bologna. His tenure is set to expire in 2027.

He is criticized for his support to Israel during the ongoing Israeli invasion of the Gaza Strip (2023–present).

== Research ==
His scientific activity has mainly related to the design and experimental verification of the reliability of agricultural tractors, machines for livestock farming, and the use of biomass and other agricultural machines.

Academic offices
Preceded by Francesco Ubertini	Rector of the University of Bologna; 1 November 2021 – present	Succeeded by N/A (incumbent)
