= Lodovico Scapinelli =

Italian philologist and poet (1585–1634)

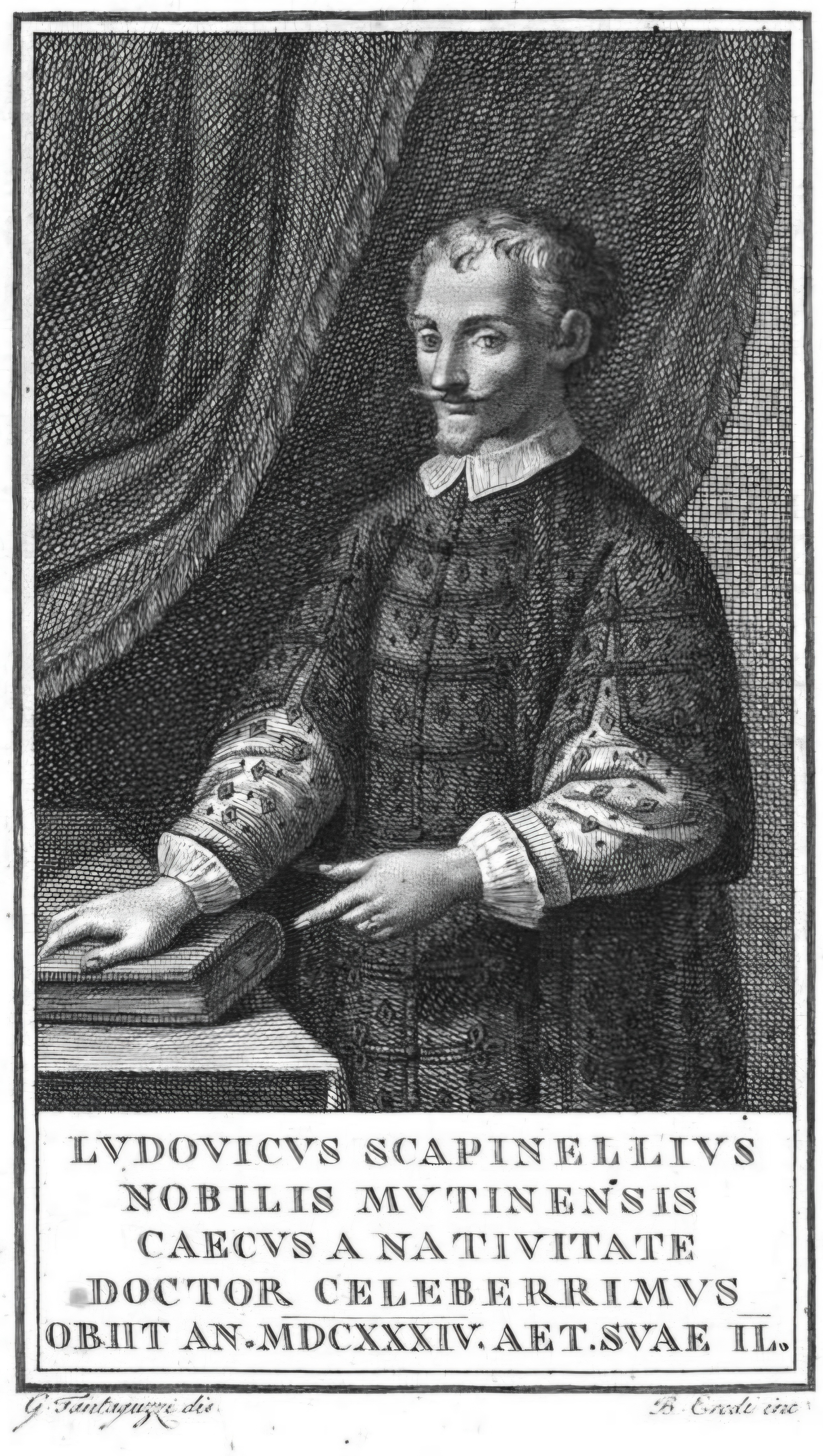
- Lodovico Scapinelli
- Born: 1585; Modena, Duchy of Modena
- Died: 3 January 1634 (aged 48–49); Modena, Duchy of Modena
- Occupations: University teacher; Philologist; Poet
- Parent(s): Bartolomeo Scapinelli and Orsola Scapinelli (née Levizzani)

Academic background
- Education: University of Bologna

Academic work
- Discipline: Classics
- Institutions: University of Bologna; University of Modena; University of Pisa

Lodovico Scapinelli (1585 – 3 January 1634) was an Italian philologist and poet.

== Biography ==
Scapinelli was born in Modena, in 1585. He was blind from his birth. He obtained his doctorate in philosophy from the University of Bologna on 15 October 1609. He tutored the son of the Duke of Modena to such good effect that his patron sent him to the University of Bologna, where he became professor of rhetoric. He later filled the chair of literature both at Modena and Pisa, until ill-health forced him to retire in 1621. But in the next seven years knowledge of his literary labors spread throughout Italy.

In 1628, Scapinelli was recalled to Bologna to fill the chair of rhetoric again. He was known for his scholarship and his lessons attracted numerous students. He lectured on Virgil, Horace, Tacitus and Livy. His academic prolusions on Livy's Ab urbe condita occupy an entire volume of a modern edition, and gained him an international reputation. Scapinelli died in Modena, on 3 January 1634, aged 48. By this time, his work was known, not only in Italy, but all over Europe. Scapinelli was a close friend of the poet Cesare Rinaldi and a member of the Accademia degli Intrepidi of Ferrara.

== Works ==
The edition of Scapinelli's, works published in Parma under the title of Opere del dottore Lodovico Scapinelli, 2 vols. 8vo, contains several Italian and Latin poems, and also some pieces in prose, and fifteen dissertations on Livy. He also wrote Commentaries on the works of Horace, Justin, and Seneca, and translated part of Virgil's Aeneid, but these works have not appeared in print.

== List of works ==
- In Nvptiis Sereniss. DD. D. Alphonsi Estensis et Infantae D. Isabellae de Sabavdia, Lvdovici Scapinelli Mvtinen. Carmen (in Latin). Mutinae: Apud Iulianum Cassianum. 1608.
- Opere del dottore Lodovico Scapinelli Patrizio Modenese soprannominato Il Cieco. Vol. 1. Parma: Reale Tipografia. 1801.
- Opere del dottore Lodovico Scapinelli Patrizio Modenese soprannominato Il Cieco. Vol. 2. Parma: Reale Tipografia. 1801.

== Bibliography ==
- Boccardo, Gerolamo (1886). "SCAPINELLI Lodovico". Nuova enciclopedia italiana ovvero Dizionario generale di scienze, lettere, industrie, ecc. Vol. 20. Turin: UTET. p. 149.
- Pozzetti, Pompilio (1801). "Elogio di Lodovico Scapinelli". Opere del dottore Lodovico Scapinelli Patrizio Modenese soprannominato Il Cieco. Vol. 1. Parma: Reale Tipografia. pp. I–LX.
- Tiraboschi, Girolamo (1784). "Scapinelli Lodovico". Biblioteca modenese. Vol. 5. Modena: Presso la Società Tipografica. pp. 49–63.
- Ross, Ishbel (1951). Journey Into Light. The Story of the Education of the Blind. New York: Appleton-Century-Crofts. p. 44.
