= Johann Philipp d'Arco =

Spanish fortress commander

- Born: 11 May 1652; Arco, Trentino, modern-day Italy
- Died: 18 February 1704 (aged 51) Bregenz, modern-day Austria
- Allegiance: Habsburg monarchy
- Service years: 1673–1703
- Rank: General officer
- Conflicts: War of the Spanish Succession

Johann Philipp d'Arco, Count of Arco (11 May 1652 – 18 February 1704) was a soldier who served the Habsburg monarchy for 30 years. Because he surrendered the fortress of Breisach after only 13 days, he was sentenced to death and executed. A different general named Arco, Jean Baptist, Comte d'Arco was employed by the Electorate of Bavaria, Austria's enemy in the War of the Spanish Succession.

== Career ==
D'Arco was born in Arco, Trentino, and already had 30 years distinguished service when he was ordered by Louis William, Margrave of Baden-Baden in 1703 to defend Breisach to the last man against a French attack under Claude Louis Hector de Villars.

The city was well defended and d'Arco disposed of sufficient soldiers to hold the city for a considerable time; but he capitulated on 6 September 1703 after only 13 days of siege. The "key" to southern Germany fell into enemy hands together with many supplies, guns and ammunition.

D'Arco was charged with treason and beheaded on 18 February 1704, at Bregenz. His second in command Luigi Ferdinando Marsigli was stripped of all honours and his sword was broken over him.

== Sources ==
Wikisource; Allgemeine Deutsche Biographie
