= Manuel Lassala =

Spanish Jesuit dramatist and humanist philosopher

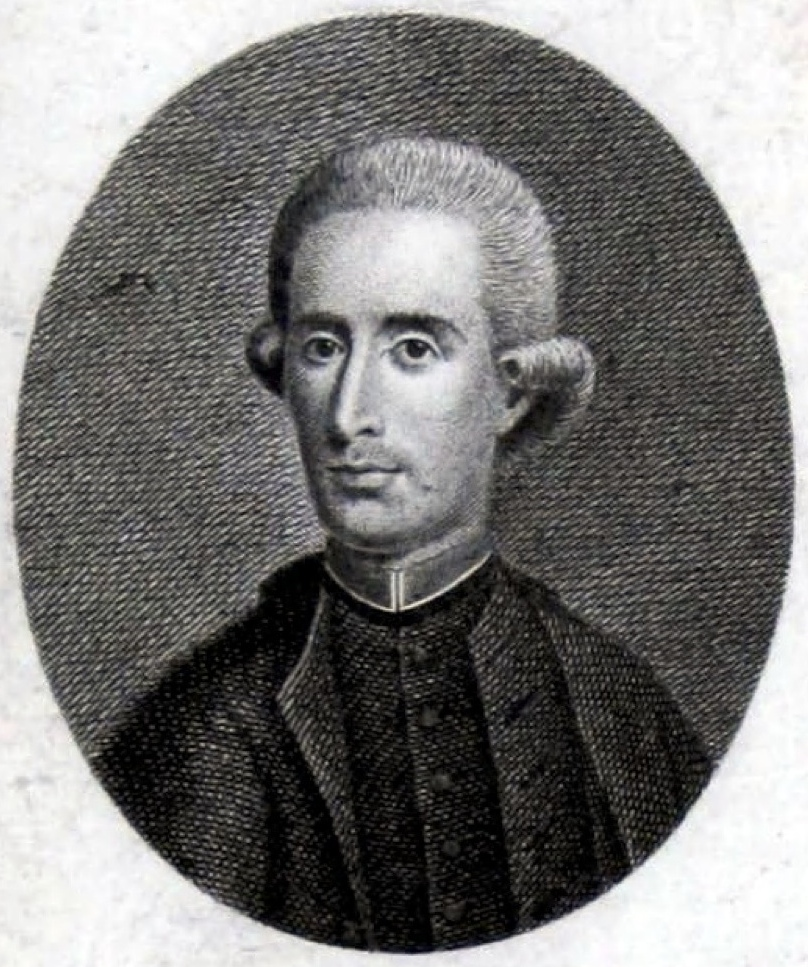
Portrait of Manuel Lassala

Manuel Lassala San Germán (1738–1806) was a Spanish Jesuit dramatist and humanist philosopher. He was exiled with the Jesuits and went on to publish several plays and writings.

== Early life ==
He was one of five children born to Frenchman Bernardo Lassala Vergés, and Valencian Senorita Inés Sangermán; Berardo was a businessman and lay abbot. and Manuel grew up to speak six languages. His uncle was the philosopher Francesco Maria Zanotti.

== Religious life ==
He entered the Society of Jesus on October 2, 1754; he studied theology at the college of San Pablo in Valencia, was professor of rhetoric at the college of nobles of San Ignacio, and was ordained a priest on December 31, 1761, in Zaragoza.

In 1763, he published two philosophical on the work of Voltaire (De Syllogismo in pristinam dignitatem restituto. De Summo Bono Morali assequendo). After the Suppression of the Society of Jesus, he moved to Corsica where he taught philosophy, then on to Bologna. He also published poems and satire.

He was admitted to the Academy of the Inestricati of Bologna in 1786.

He died in Valencia; he was buried in the church of the convent of San Francisco el Grande.

== Publications ==
His most famous publications included;

- De serificio civium bologmensium libellus singularis (A singular pamphlet on the serification of the citizens of Bologna) (1782)
- Ormisinda; tragedia con alcune scene liriche, (Ormisinda; tragedy with some lyrical scenes) (1783)
- Lucia Miranda(1784)
- Iphigenia in Aulide (1779)
