= Pio Rajna =

Italian philologist and literary critic

Pio Rajna (8 July 1847, Sondrio – 25 November 1930, Florence) was an Italian philologist, literary critic, and senator. He was known for his work on Italian chivalric literature and French chansons de geste.

Rajna was born in Sondrio, a city in the Kingdom of Lombardy–Venetia in the Austrian Empire, in 1847. He was the first-born son of Eugenio Paolo Rajna and Costanza Simonetta. His younger brother Michele Rajna, born 1854, was an Italian astronomer and mathematician.

Rajna was appointed Knight of the Order of the Crown of Italy in 1881 (later promoted to Grand Officer), a Knight of the Order of SS. Maurizio and Lazzaro in 1892 (later promoted to Officer in 1897 and Commander), and a Knight of the Civil Order of Savoy in 1909. He was appointed to the Senate of the Kingdom of Italy in 1920, as a member of the Accademia nazionale delle scienze of seven years' standing.

Rajna was elected a Corresponding Fellow of the British Academy in 1920.
