= Ivano Dionigi =

Italian Rector

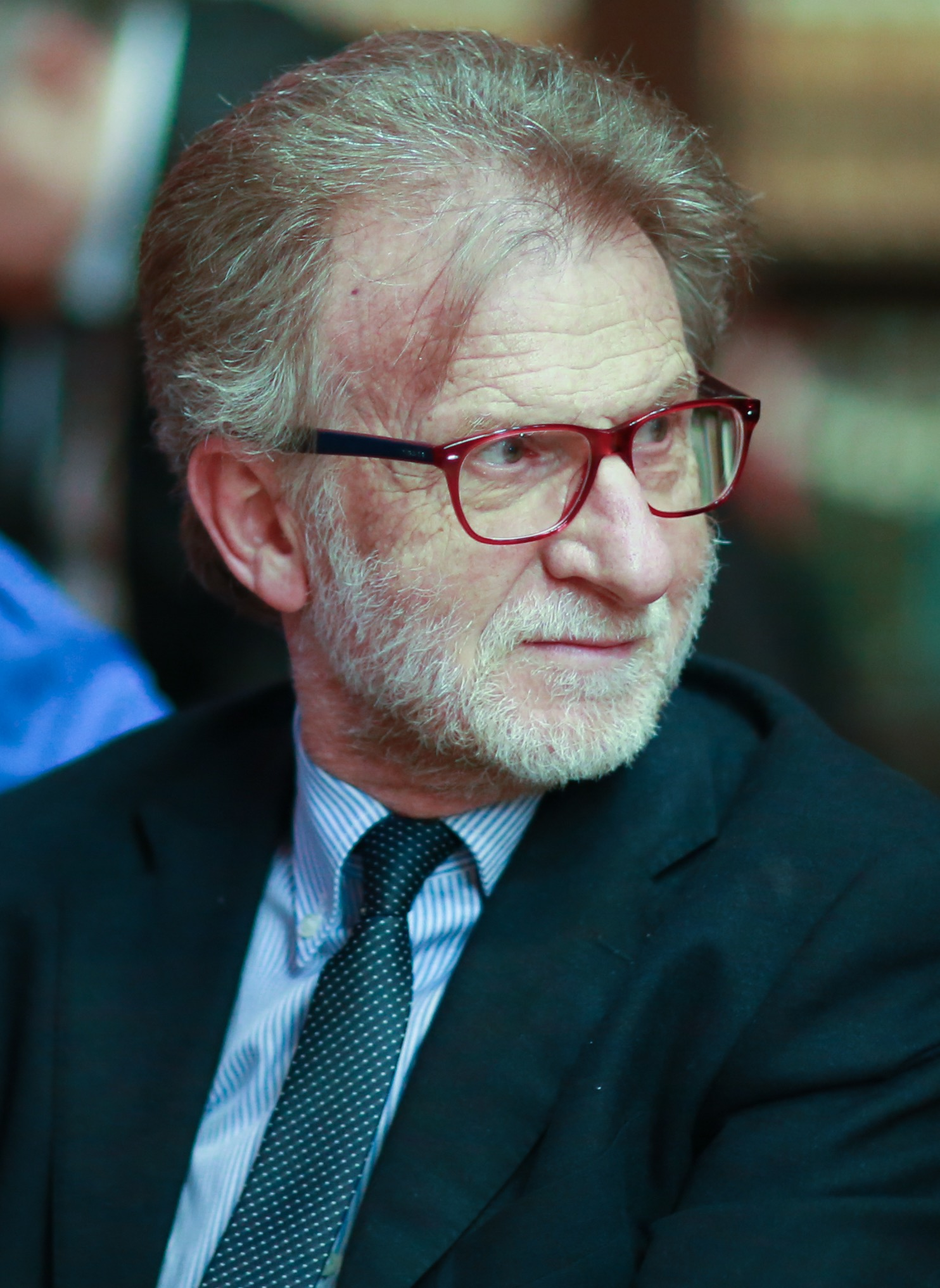

Rector of the University of Bologna
- In office 1 November 2009 – 31 October 2015
- Preceded by: Pier Ugo Calzolari
- Succeeded by: Francesco Ubertini

Personal details
- Born: February 20, 1948 (age 78) Pesaro
- Education: University of Bologna
- Occupation: Lecturer, Latinist and Rector

Ivano Dionigi (born February 20, 1948, in Pesaro) is an Italian lecturer and rector.

He is a professor of Latin literature, he was Rector of the University of Bologna from 2009 to 2015; he is a member of the Academy of Sciences of Bologna. On 10 November 2012 he was nominated by Benedict XVI as president of the newly formed Pontifical Academy for Latin.

== Academic career ==
After graduating from the 'Terenzio Mamiani' high school in Pesaro, he graduated in classical literature at the University of Bologna. At the same University he trained as a researcher and as a lecturer in 1990. In 1999 he became founder and director of the La Permanenza del Classico Study Center.

On 27 May 2009 he was elected Rector of the University of Bologna, with 1282 preferences. Over the years his studies have focused mainly on Lucretius and Seneca, on the relationship between Christians and Pagans. He has also made over a hundred publications. He is a Member of the Italian Communist Party, he was part of the Bologna City Council.

== Publications ==
- Due interpretazioni unilaterali di Lucrezio, in "Studi Urbinati", 1973.
- L. Anneo Seneca, De otio. Testo e apparato critico con Introduzione, Versione e Commento a cura di I. Dionigi, Brescia 1983
- Lucrezio. Le parole e le cose, Bologna 1988
- Commento a T. Lucrezio Caro, La natura delle cose, Milano 1990.
- Verba et res, morfosintassi e lessico del latino (con E. Riganti e L. Morisi), Bari 1997.
- Necessità dei classici in AA.VV., Di fronte ai classici, Milano 2002.
