= Giovanni Battista Guglielmini =

Italian physicist

- Born: 16 August 1763; Bologna, Papal States
- Died: 15 December 1817 (aged 54); Bologna, Papal States
- Resting place: Certosa di Bologna
- Education: University of Bologna
- Known for: conducting the first successful experimental proof of the Earth's rotation using falling bodies
- Scientific career
- Workplaces: University of Bologna
- Doctoral advisor: Sebastiano Canterzani

Giovanni Battista Guglielmini (Italian pronunciation: [dʒoˈvanni batˈtista ɡuʎʎelˈmiːni]; 16 August 1763 – 15 December 1817) was an Italian physicist. His experiments at the Observatory of Bologna provided early measurements for Earth's rotation.

== Life ==
Guglielmini was born at Bologna, received the tonsure in early youth and was a secular priest ("abate"). His career in the Church is unknown; he died single. A protégé of Cardinal Ignazio Boncompagni, he pursued higher studies, and graduated in philosophy, in 1787, at the age of 24. If he was a relative of the famous engineer and physician, Domenico Guglielmini, who had been general superintendent of the Bologna waterworks a hundred years before, he was certainly not his direct descendant.

=== Guglielmini's experiments ===
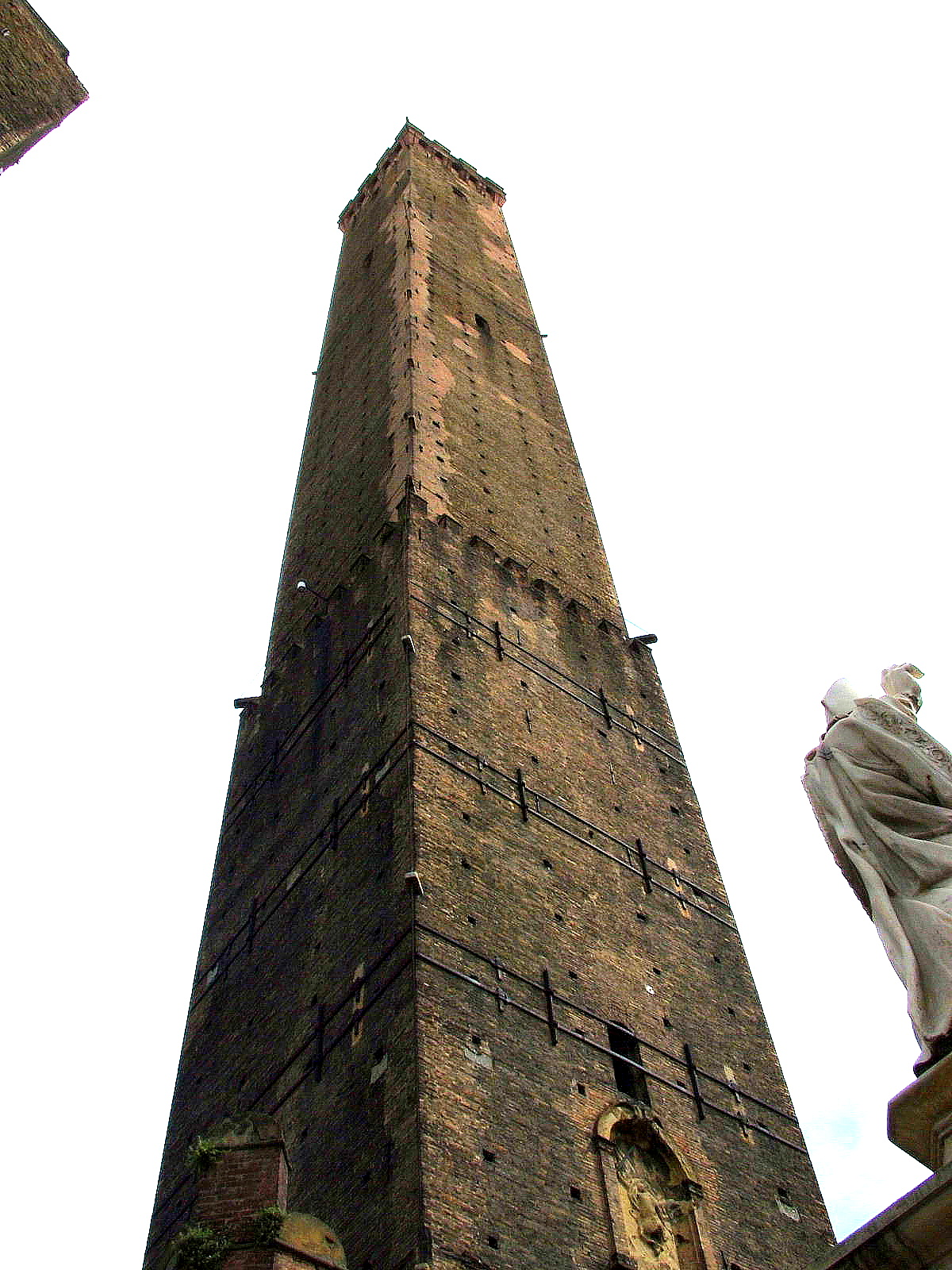
Torre degli Asinelli, Bologne

In 1789 Guglielmini published his first treatise, Riflessioni sopra un nuovo esperimento in prova del diurno moto della terra (Reflections on a new experiment to prove the daily motion of the Earth). The experiments were made in the Asinelli tower of Bologna, famous from former experiments of Riccioli on the laws of falling bodies. The preface of a small octavo volume, published in Bologna in 1792, De diuturno terræ motu experimentis physico-mathematicis confirmato, gives the history and description of Guglielmini's experiments, then resumes in the first article the contents of the Riflessioni, defends the same in the second article against opponents, and in the third presents the results. The book bears the imprimatur of the Holy Office at Bologna.

Sixteen balls were dropped from a height of 241 feet, between June and September, 1791, and the plumb-line fixed in February, 1792, all during the night, to minimize the effects of road traffic. The mean deviations towards east and south proved to be 8.4''' and 5.3''' respectively, while the computation gave 7.6''' and 6.2''' (1'''= 1-12 inch). In spite of their agreement both observation and calculation were defective, the plumb-line having been determined half a year later, and the theory of motion relative to the moving earth being as yet undeveloped. However, the tangential force that was applied to the body was known since Newton due to the rotation motion of the earth. Guglielmini therefore contributed to the understanding of the Earth's rotation.

Guglielmini's experimental skill and laborious precautions, however, served his followers, Johann Friedrich Benzenberg (1802 and 1804) and Ferdinand Reich (1831), as models, and the inner agreement of his results was never surpassed. Guglielmini's theory was right, in considering the absolute path of the falling body (apart from the resistance of the air) as elliptical, or approximately parabolic, and the orbital plane as passing a little north of the vertical, through the center of attraction, while the errors in his formulas, afterwards repeated by Olbers, served to incite C. F. Gauss and Laplace to develop the correct theory of relative motion.

=== Later career ===
In 1794, Guglielmini was nominated professor of mathematics at the University of Bologna, an office he held for twenty-three years (until 1817). In 1801, he also filled the chair of astronomy. In 1802 Napoleon named him to the newly created chair of introduction to infinitesimal calculus. During the scholastic year 1814–15, he officiated as rector of the university. From about 1802 until 1810, Guglielmini was put in charge of the extensive waterworks of Bologna.

Guglielmini was a member of the "Accademia Benedettina", of the "Regio Istituto Italiano" and was "Elettore del Collegio dei Dotti". He was of frail health, and died at the age of 54 in his home town of Bologna.

In 1837, the city ordered a marble bust of him to be erected in the pantheon of the Certosa di Bologna.

== Selected works ==
- Riflessioni sopra un nuovo esperimento in prova del diurno moto della Terra, p. 422, at Google Books (Rome, 1789) (in Italian)
- De diuturno terræ motu experimentis physico-mathematicis confirmato (1792) (in Latin) (e-rara.ch digitization)
- Elogio di Lionardo Pisano recitato nella grand'Aula della regia Università di Bologna (1812) (in Italian) (On Fibonacci). HathiTrust’s digitization

== Bibliography ==
- The first version of this article was taken from:, which cites (among others):
  - Mazzetti, Serafino (1848). Repertorio di tutti i professori antichi, e moderni della famosa Università, e del celebre Istituto delle scienze di Bologna (in Italian). Bologna: Tip. S. Tommaso d'Aquino.
  - Pantheon di Bologna (in Italian). Bologna: Successori Monti. 1881.
- Benzenberg, Johann Friedrich (1845). Versuche über die Umdrehung der Erde (in German). Düsseldorf: Bötticher. p. 10.
- Mazzetti, Serafino (1840). Memorie storiche sopra l'università e l'istituto delle scienze di Bologna (in Italian). Bologna: Tip. S. Tommaso d'Aquino.
