= Guido Horn d'Arturo =

Italian astronomer (1879–1967)

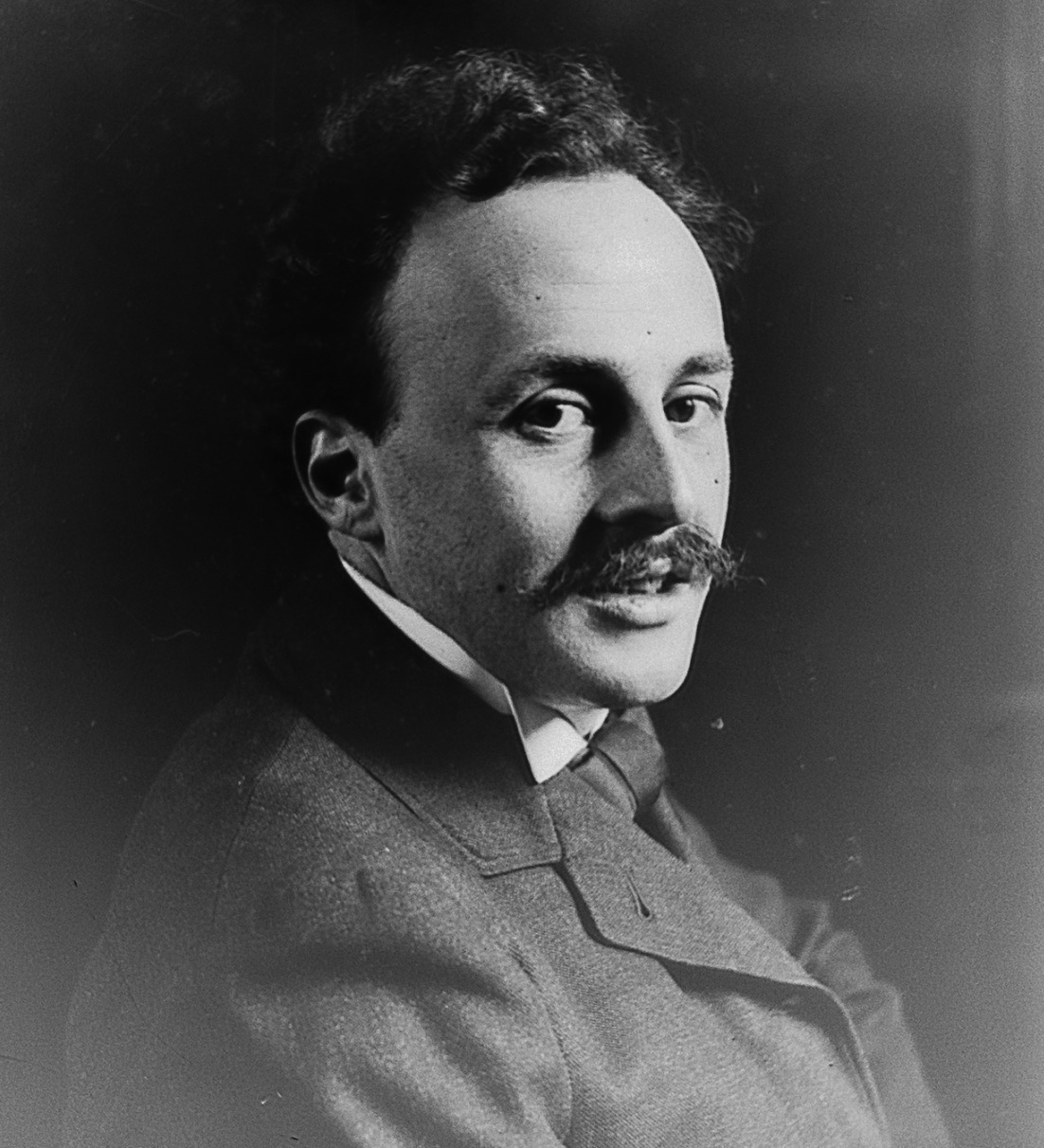
- Guido Horn d'Arturo
- Born: 13 February 1879; Trieste, Friuli-Venezia Giulia, Italy
- Died: 1 April 1967 (aged 88); Bologna, Italy
- Education: University of Vienna
- Known for: Inventor of the tessellated telescope
- Awards: War Cross of Military Valor (1919); Order of Merit of the Italian Republic (1957)
- Scientific career
- Fields: Astronomy, Celestial Mechanics
- Workplaces: Catania Astrophysical Observatory, Turin Astronomical Observatory, Collegio Romano Observatory, Bologna Observatory

Signature
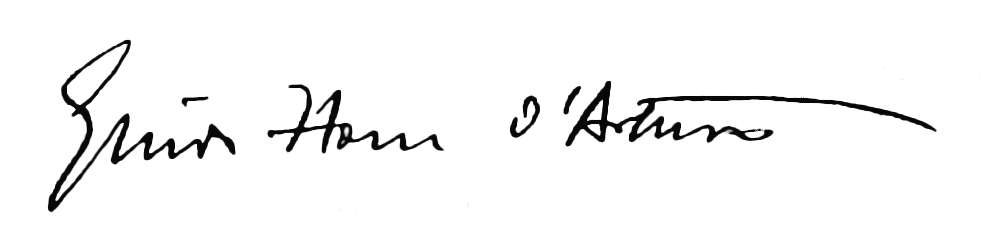

Guido Horn d'Arturo (13 February 1879 – 1 April 1967) was an Italian astronomer born in Trieste, then part of the Austrian Empire. He obtained Italian citizenship after serving as a volunteer in the Italian army during the First World War. To avoid being persecuted as an irredentist by the Austrian authorities, he officially added to his surname Horn that of "d'Arturo" which he used in the war.

He was director of the Observatory of Bologna from 1921 to 1954, with an interruption of over six years following the persecution for fascist racial laws. In 1931 he founded the magazine Coelum for the dissemination of astronomy in the society.

The asteroid 3744, discovered in 1983, bears the name "Horn-d'Arturo".

== Segmented mirror telescope ==
In the 1930s, Horn d'Arturo created the tessellated telescope, a progenitor of segmented mirror telescopes.

In 1932 Horn d'Arturo began to work on a new idea of combining small mirror tassels, to build a larger telescope mirror. The difficulty of building high quality monolithic glass mirrors with diameters bigger than a few meters was becoming apparent during the development of the 5m Palomar telescope. These mirrors were in any case too expensive for the Italian economy, still struggling after the great depression of 1929. Horn's idea was to build smaller mirrors of the same spherical section of the larger one in which they would be combined so that the rays reflected by the single elements would converge in the same focal plane and produce a single image of each star in the field of view. This way, spherical aberration would be eliminated, together with other aberrations characteristic of spherical mirrors: a pioneering idea of active optics, commonly used nowadays in modern telescopes.

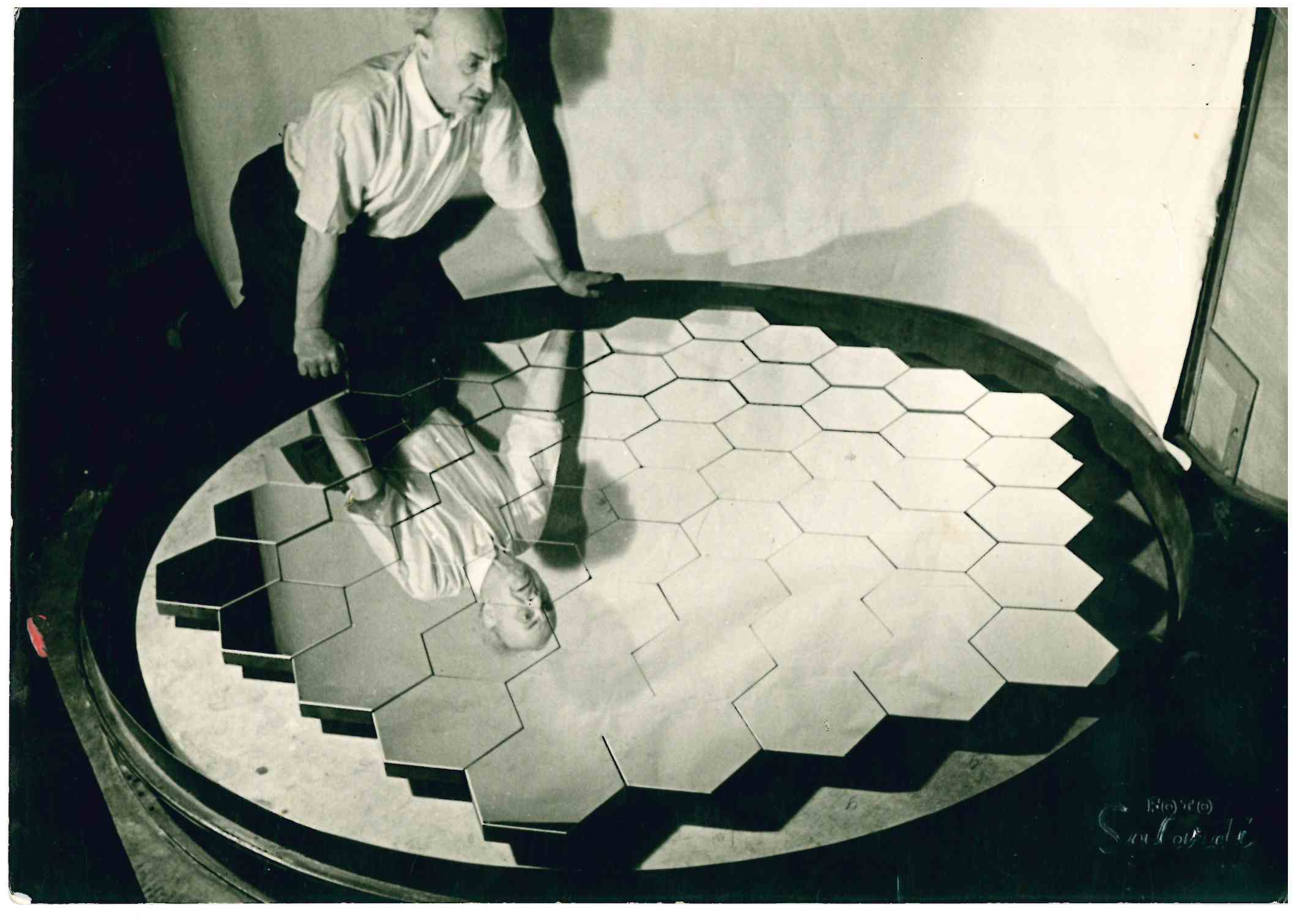
Guido Horn d’Arturo and his 1952 mirror.

In 1935, Horn d'Arturo constructed a 1 m prototype. Some years later in 1952, he assembled a larger 1.8 meter diameter telescope consisting of 61 tassels, which was installed in the astronomical tower in Bologna. More than 17000 photographic plates were obtained by Horn d'Arturo and collaborators who used this telescope for a systematic survey of the local zenithal sky and discovered a dozen of variable stars. Both the prototype and the 1.8 m telescope are exhibited at the Museo della Specola di Bologna at the University of Bologna.

The original principle devised by Horn d'Arturo is at the foundation of the new generation of multi-mirror telescopes (or segmented mirrors): the Multiple Mirror Telescope in Arizona, built in 1979, the twin telescopes of the Keck Observatory in Hawaii, built between 1993 and 1996, consisting of 36 segments 1.8 m each for a total diameter of 10 meters. On Cerro Armazones in the Atacama Desert in Chile work on the dome of the ELT (Extremely Large Telescope), a 39.3 m telescope composed of 798 segments, started in 2017. The James Webb Space Telescope, launched on 25 December 2021, has a primary mirror composed of 18 hexagonal segments for a diameter of 6.5 m

The Società Astronomica Italiana (SAIT), and the Istituto Nazionale di Astrofisica (INAF), dedicated the telescope ASTRI (Astrophysics with Mirrors with Italian Replicant Technology), located on the volcano Etna in Sicily, to Horn. On 10 November 2018, with an official ceremony, the telescope was named "ASTRI-Horn".
