= Eustachio Zanotti =

Italian astronomer and engineer (1709–1782)

Eustachio Zanotti FRS
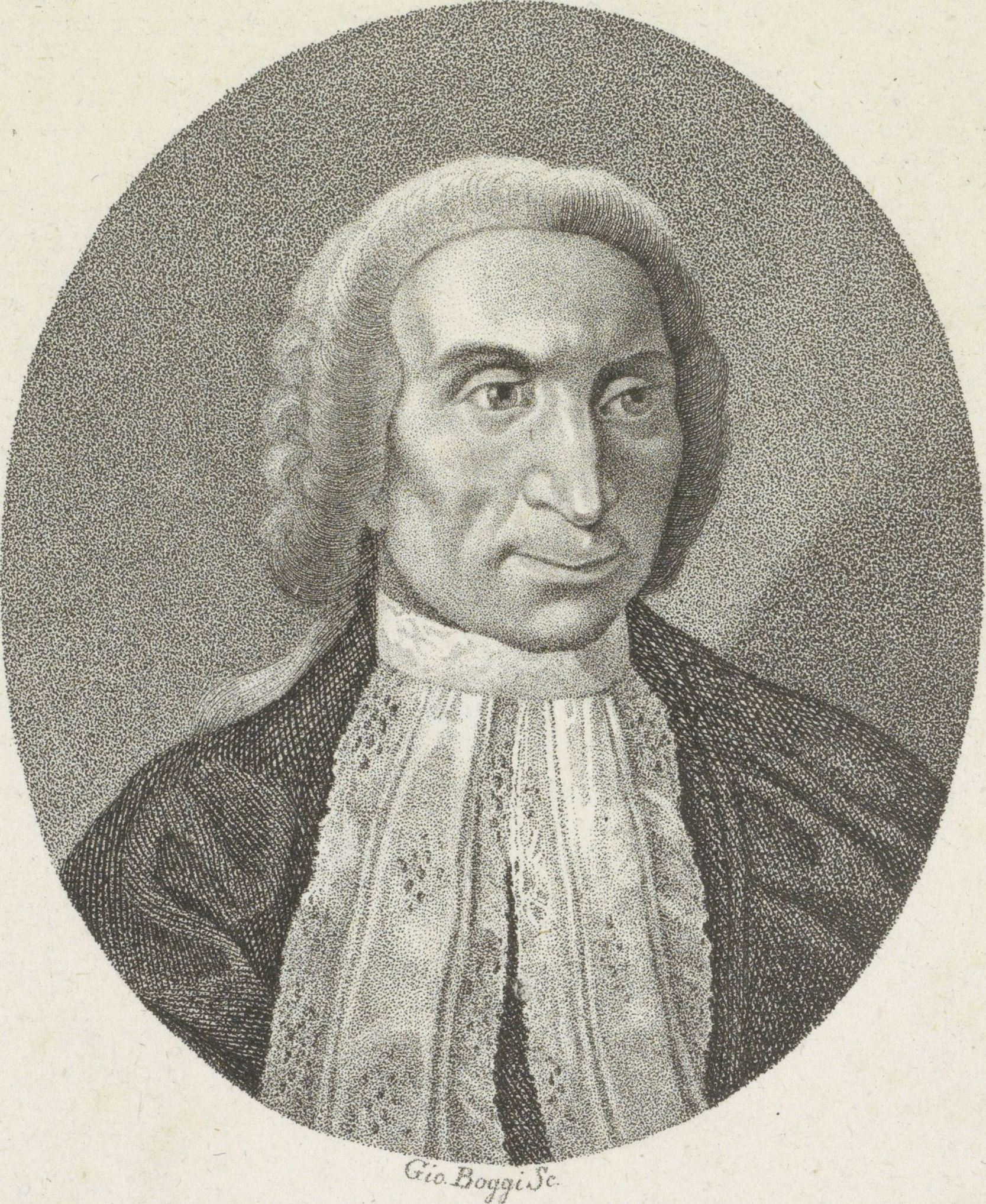
- Eustachio Zanotti in an engraving by Giovanni Boggi
- Born: 27 November 1709; Bologna, Papal States
- Died: 15 May 1782 (aged 72); Bologna, Papal States
- Occupations: Astronomer, engineer
- Parent(s): Giampietro Zanotti and Costanza M. Teresa Zanotti (née Gambari)

Academic background
- Education: University of Bologna

Academic work
- Era: Scientific Revolution
- Discipline: Astronomy

Notes
- He is the nephew of Francesco Maria Zanotti.

Eustachio Zanotti FRS (27 November 1709 – 15 May 1782) was an Italian astronomer and engineer. He was director of the Observatory of Bologna for four decades.

== Biography ==
Zanotti was born in Bologna where his father Giampietro was a poet, painter and art historian. His mother was Constanza M. Teresa Gambari. An uncle was the philosopher Francesco Maria Zanotti. Zanotti studied at Jesuit schools and became interest in science and mathematics, trained under Eustachio Manfredi (1674-1739) at the Bologna observatory where he began to work from 1729. He received a degree from the University of Bologna in 1730. In 1738 he examined Newton's theory of light. He became a director of the observatory in 1739 following Manfredi's death. His contributions included the improvement of instruments at the observatory, the calculation of the elliptical orbit of a comet, maintaining notes on transits of Mercury (May 6, 1752) and Venus (June 6, 1761) with which he tried to estimate the distance between the Sun and the Earth as well as the diameter of Venus using parallax based measurements. He collated an ephemeris and star catalogue along with his assistants Petronio Matteucci and Giovanni Angelo Brunelli from 1751. He helped restore a sundial in 1776 that had been designed by Giovanni Cassini in the basilica of San Petronio. He also made predictions on the shape of the Earth including the flattening of the poles based on Newtonian mechanics. He made observations on the northern lights and took an interest in hydraulics. He was elected Fellow of the Royal Society of London in 1740 and was also a member of learned societies in Italy and Germany. His work on water flow measurements dealt with disputes relating to the flow of water in the Reno and the Po. He was involved in reclamation of marshes and examining plans for canals. He wrote on the mathematics of perspective in art and sought to bridge the fields of mathematics and art.

== Works ==
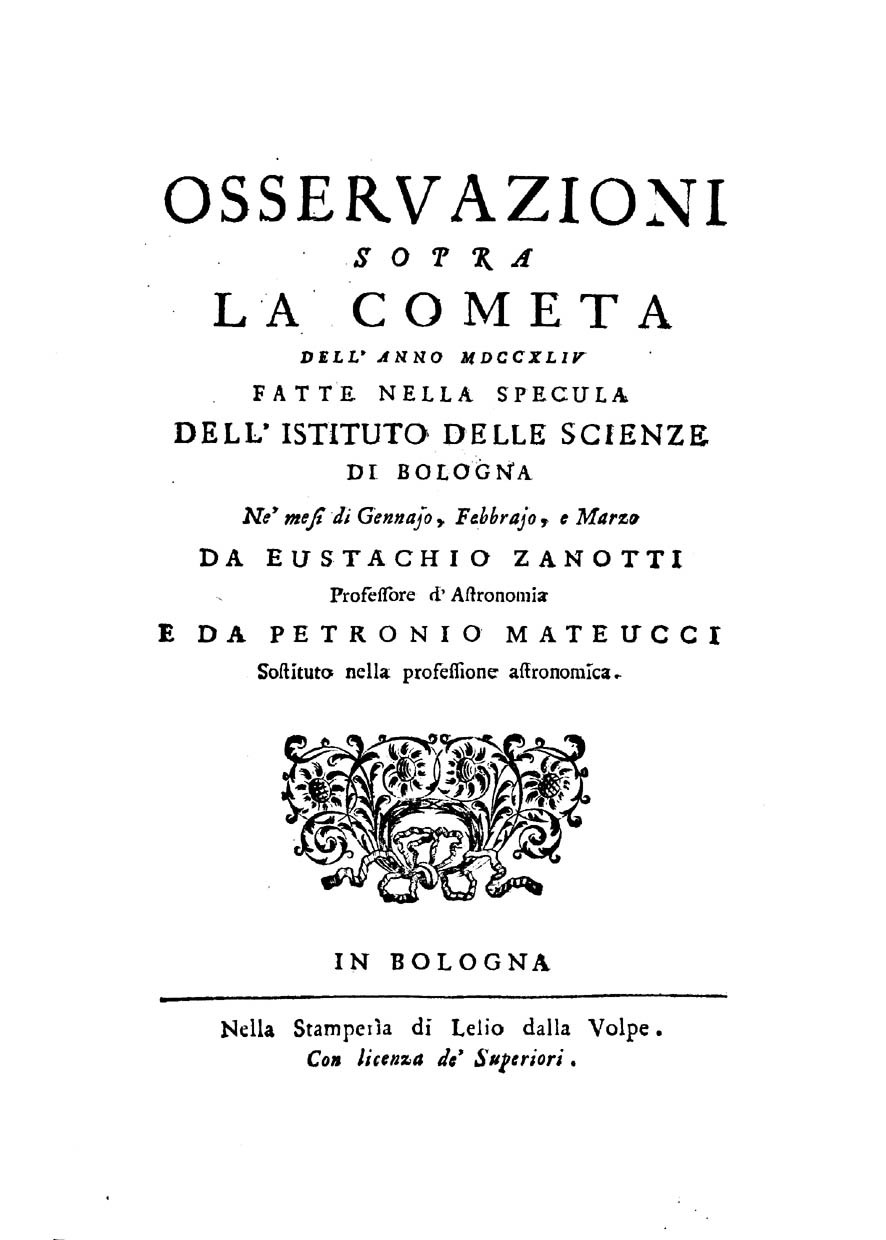
Osservazioni sopra la cometa dell'anno 1744 fatte nella specula dell'Istituto delle scienze di Bologna ne' mesi di gennaio, febbrajo, e marzo, Bologna, 1744

- Osservazioni sopra la cometa dell'anno 1744 fatte nella specula dell'Istituto delle scienze di Bologna ne' mesi di gennaio, febbrajo, e marzo (in Italian). Bologna: Lelio Dalla Volpe. 1744.
- Ephemerides motuum caelestium ex anno 1763 in annum 1774 (in Latin). Bologna: Lelio Dalla Volpe. 1762.
- Ephemerides motuum coelestium ex anno 1751 in annum 1762 (in Latin). Bologna: Costantino Pisarri. 1750.
- De Veneris ac Solis congressu observatio habita in astronomica specula Bononiensis Scientiarum Instituti die 5 junii 1761 (in Latin). Bologna: Lelio Dalla Volpe. 1761.
- De viribus centralibus (in Latin). Bologna: Lelio Dalla Volpe. 1762.
- Ephemerides motuum caelestium ex anno 1775 in annum 1786 ad meridianum Bononiae (in Latin). Bologna: Lelio Dalla Volpe. 1774.

== Bibliography ==
- Tabarroni, Giorgio (1976). "Zanotti, Eustachio". In Charles Coulston Gillispie (ed.). Dictionary of Scientific Biography. Vol. XIV. New York: Charles Scribner's Sons. pp. 589–90.
- Cavazza, Marta (2002). "The Institute of Science of Bologna and the Royal Society in the Eighteenth Century". Notes and Records of the Royal Society of London. 56 (1): 3–25. JSTOR 532119.
- Aebischer, Tullio (2020). "ZANOTTI, Eustachio". Dizionario Biografico degli Italiani (in Italian). Vol. 100: Vittorio Emanuele I–Zurlo. Rome: Istituto dell'Enciclopedia Italiana. ISBN 978-88-12-00032-6.
