= University of Bologna =

Public university in Bologna, Italy

- Alma Mater Studiorum – Università di Bologna
- Seal of the university
- Latin: Universitas Bononiensis
- Motto: Petrus ubique pater legum Bononia mater (Latin)
- Motto in English: St. Peter is everywhere the father of the law, Bologna is its mother
- Type: Public research university
- Established: c. 1088; 938 years ago
- Academic affiliations: Coimbra Group; Europaeum; European Universities Association; Guild of European Research-Intensive Universities; International Association of Universities; Mediterranean Universities Union; Scholars at Risk; Una Europa; Utrecht Network
- Rector: Giovanni Molari
- Academic staff: 2,917
- Administrative staff: 2,965
- Students: 90,291
- Undergraduates: 47,253
- Postgraduates: 36,266
- Doctoral students: 4,239
- Location: Metropolitan City of Bologna, plus areas of Forlì-Cesena, Ravenna and Rimini, Italy; 44°29′38″N 11°20′34″E
- Campus: University town 103 hectares (256 acres)
- Newspaper: UNIBO Magazine
- Colours: Red
- Sports teams: CUS Bologna
- Website: unibo.it

The University of Bologna (Italian: Alma Mater Studiorum – Università di Bologna; abbreviated Unibo) is a public research university in Bologna, Italy. It is the oldest university in continuous operation in the world, and the first degree-awarding institution of higher learning. Teaching began around 1088, with the university becoming organised as universitas scholarium or guilds of students by the late 12th century. The university's emblem carries the motto Alma Mater Studiorum (Latin for 'Nourishing mother of studies') and the date A.D. 1088. With over 90,000 students, the University of Bologna is one of the largest universities in Europe.

The university saw the first woman to earn a university degree and teach at a university (Bettisia Gozzadini), and the first woman to earn both a doctorate in science and a salaried position as a university professor (Laura Bassi). The University of Bologna had a central role in the sciences during the medieval age and the Italian Renaissance, when it housed and educated Nicholas Copernicus in addition to numerous other Renaissance mathematicians. It has educated a wide range of notable alumni, amongst them a large number of Italian scientists, prime ministers, supreme court judges and priests.

Aside from its main campus in Bologna, the university has additional campuses in Cesena (including Cesenatico), Forlì, Ravenna (including Faenza) and Rimini, as well as teaching facilities in Ozzano and Imola and branches abroad in Buenos Aires, New York, Brussels and Shanghai. It houses the fully funded boarding college Collegio Superiore di Bologna, the Bologna School of Advanced Studies, the botanical gardens of Bologna, a large number of museums, libraries and archeological collections, as well as the Bologna University Press.

== History ==
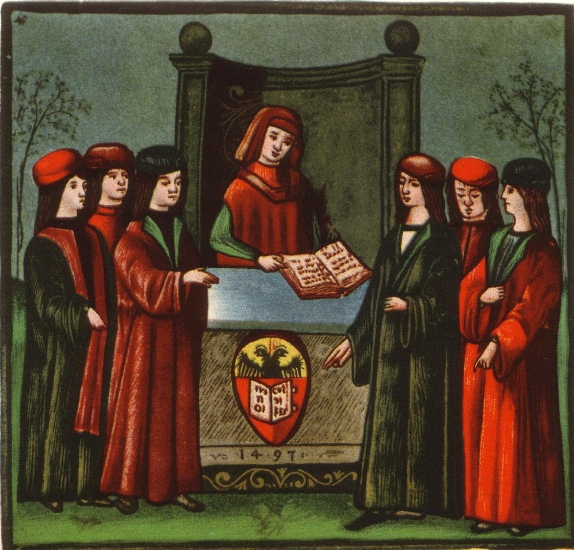
The entry of students in the Natio Germanica Bononiae, the nation of German students at Bologna; miniature of 1497.

The date of the University of Bologna's founding is uncertain. The university was granted a charter (Authentica habita) by Holy Roman Emperor Frederick I Barbarossa in 1158, but in the 19th century, a committee of historians led by Giosuè Carducci traced the founding of the university back to 1088, which would make it the oldest continuously operating university in the world. However, the development of the institution at Bologna into a university was a gradual process. Paul Grendler writes that "it is not likely that enough instruction and organization existed to merit the term university before the 1150s, and it might not have happened before the 1180s."

The university arose around mutual aid societies (known as universitates scholarium) of foreign students called "nations" (as they were grouped by nationality) for protection against city laws which imposed collective punishment on foreigners for the crimes and debts of their countrymen. These students then hired scholars from the city's pre-existing lay and ecclesiastical schools to teach them subjects such as liberal arts, notarial law, theology, and ars dictaminis (scrivenery). The lectures were given in informal schools called scholae. In time the various universitates scholarium decided to form a larger association, or Studium—thus, the university. The Studium grew to have a strong position of collective bargaining with the city, since by then it derived significant revenue through visiting foreign students, who would depart if they were not well treated. The foreign students in Bologna received greater rights, and collective punishment was ended. There was also collective bargaining with the scholars who served as professors at the university. By the initiation or threat of a student strike, the students could enforce their demands as to the content of courses and the pay professors would receive. University professors were hired, fired, and had their pay determined by an elected council of two representatives from every student "nation" which governed the institution, with the most important decisions requiring a majority vote from all the students to ratify. The professors could also be fined if they failed to finish classes on time, or complete course material by the end of the semester. A student committee, the "Denouncers of Professors", kept tabs on them and reported any misbehavior. Professors themselves were not powerless, however, forming collegia doctorum (professors' committees) in each faculty, and securing the rights to set examination fees and degree requirements. Eventually, the city ended this arrangement, paying professors from tax revenues and making it a chartered public university.

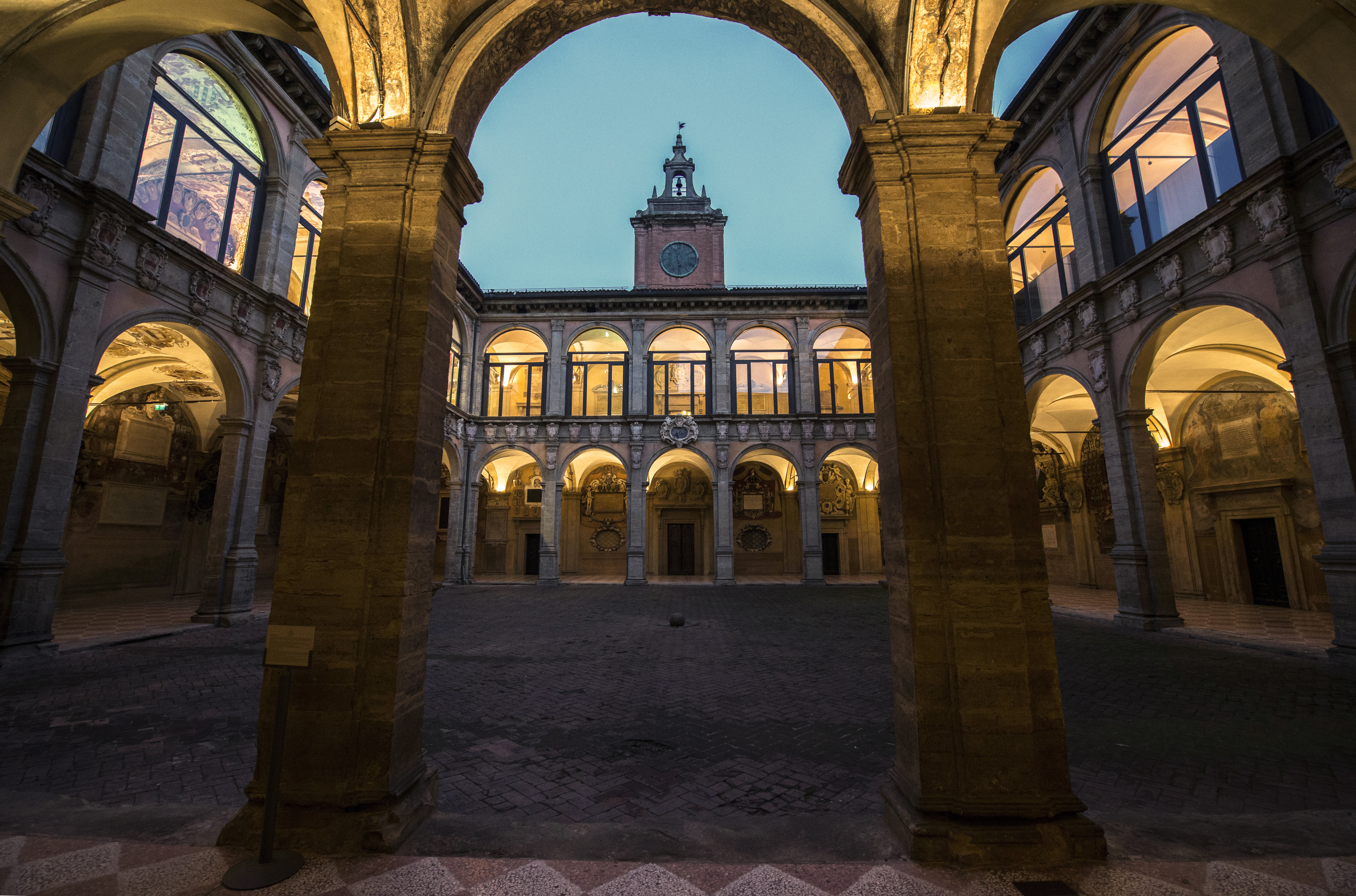
Archiginnasio, main seat of the University between 1563 and 1803

The university is historically notable for its teaching of canon and civil law; indeed, it was set up in large part with the aim of studying the Digest, a central text in Roman law, which had been rediscovered in Italy in 1070, and the university was central in the development of medieval Roman law. Until modern times, the only degree granted at that university was the doctorate.

Bettisia Gozzadini earned a law degree in 1237, being one of the first women in history to obtain a university degree. She taught law from her own home for two years, and in 1239 she taught at the university, becoming the first woman in history to teach at a university.

In 1711, Luigi Ferdinando Marsili convinced Pope Clement XI to provide funds to establish the Observatory of Bologna, the first public astronomical observatory in Italy. It was a center for research by astronomers such as Eustachio Manfredi, Giovanni Battista Guglielmini, and Eustachio Zanotti in the 18th century, and physicists like Guido Horn d'Arturo and Luigi Giuseppe Jacchia in the 20th century.

Laura Bassi was born into a prosperous family of Bologna and was privately educated from the age of five. Bassi's education and intellect was noticed by Prospero Lorenzini Lambertini, who became the Archbishop of Bologna in 1731 (later Pope Benedict XIV). Lambertini became the official patron of Bassi. He arranged for a public debate between Bassi and four professors from the University of Bologna on 17 April 1732. In 1732, Bassi, aged twenty, publicly defended her forty-nine theses on Philosophica Studia at the Sala degli Anziani of the Palazzo Pubblico. The University of Bologna awarded her a doctorate degree on 12 May. She became the first woman to receive a doctorate in science, and the second woman in the world to earn a philosophy doctorate after Elena Cornaro Piscopia in 1678, fifty-four years prior. She was by then popularly known as Bolognese Minerva. On 29 October 1732, the Senate and the University of Bologna granted Bassi's candidature, and in December she was appointed professor of natural philosophy to teach physics. She became the first salaried woman lecturer in the world, thus beginning her academic career. She was also the first woman member of any scientific establishment, when she was elected to the Academy of Sciences of the Institute of Bologna in 1732. Bassi became the most important populariser of Newtonian mechanics in Italy.

In 1971, the Hellenist Benedetto Marzullo in company with Umberto Eco, Renato Barilli, Adelio Ferrero instituted within the Faculty of Letters and Arts the DAMS (acronym of discipline delle arti, della musica e dello spettacolo, "Discipline of Arts, Musics and Performance"). It was the first degree course of this type to be opened in Italy. Between December 26, 1982, and November 29, 1983, there occurred the DAMS murders (in Italian: Delitti del DAMS), dealing with four victims who were students or professors of the DAMS: Angelo Fabbri (a brilliant student of Umberto Eco), Liviana Rossi, the dancer Francesca Alinovi (who was stabbed for 47 times), and Leonarda Polvani.

== Organization ==
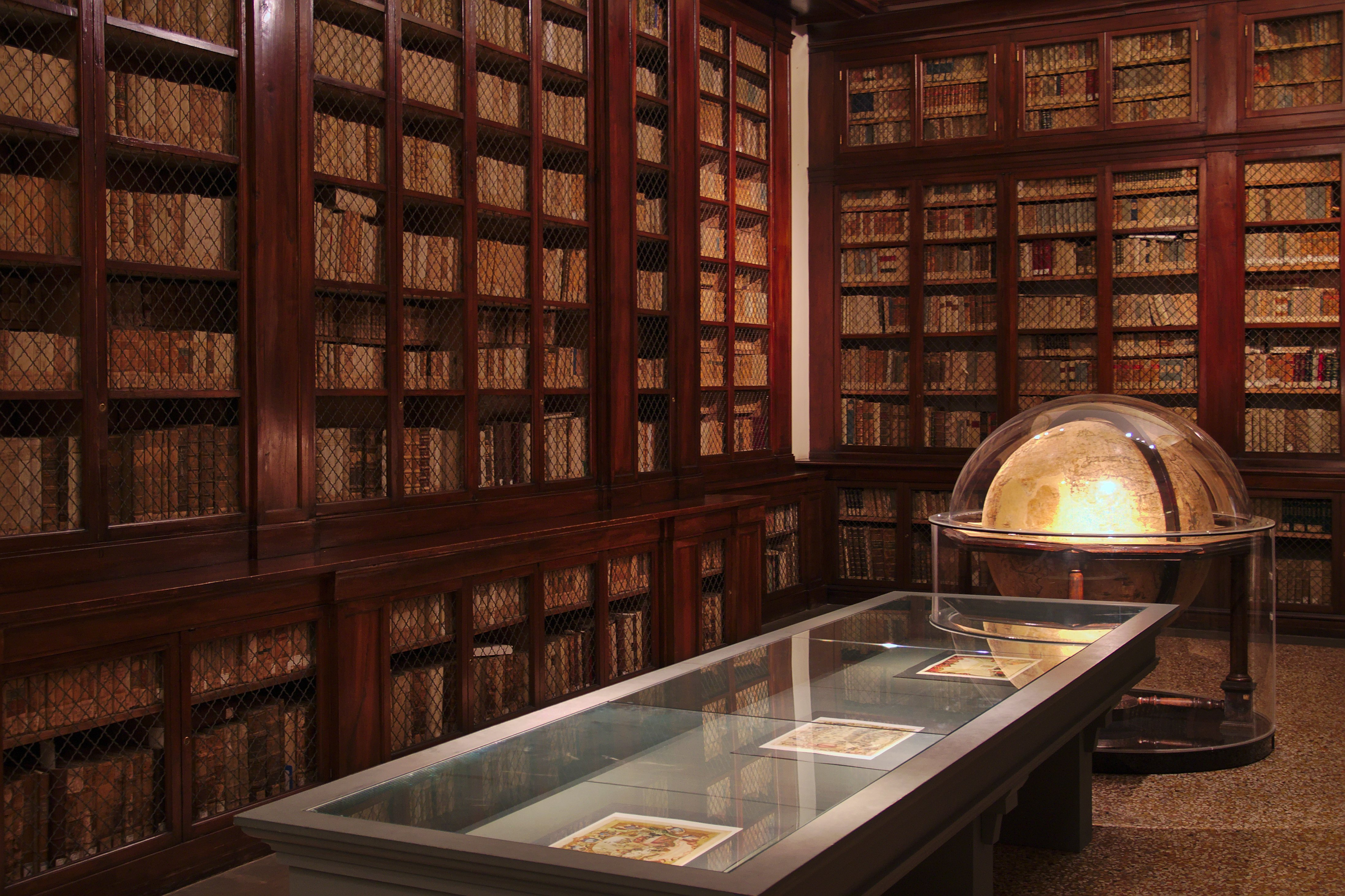
University Library in the Palazzo Poggi

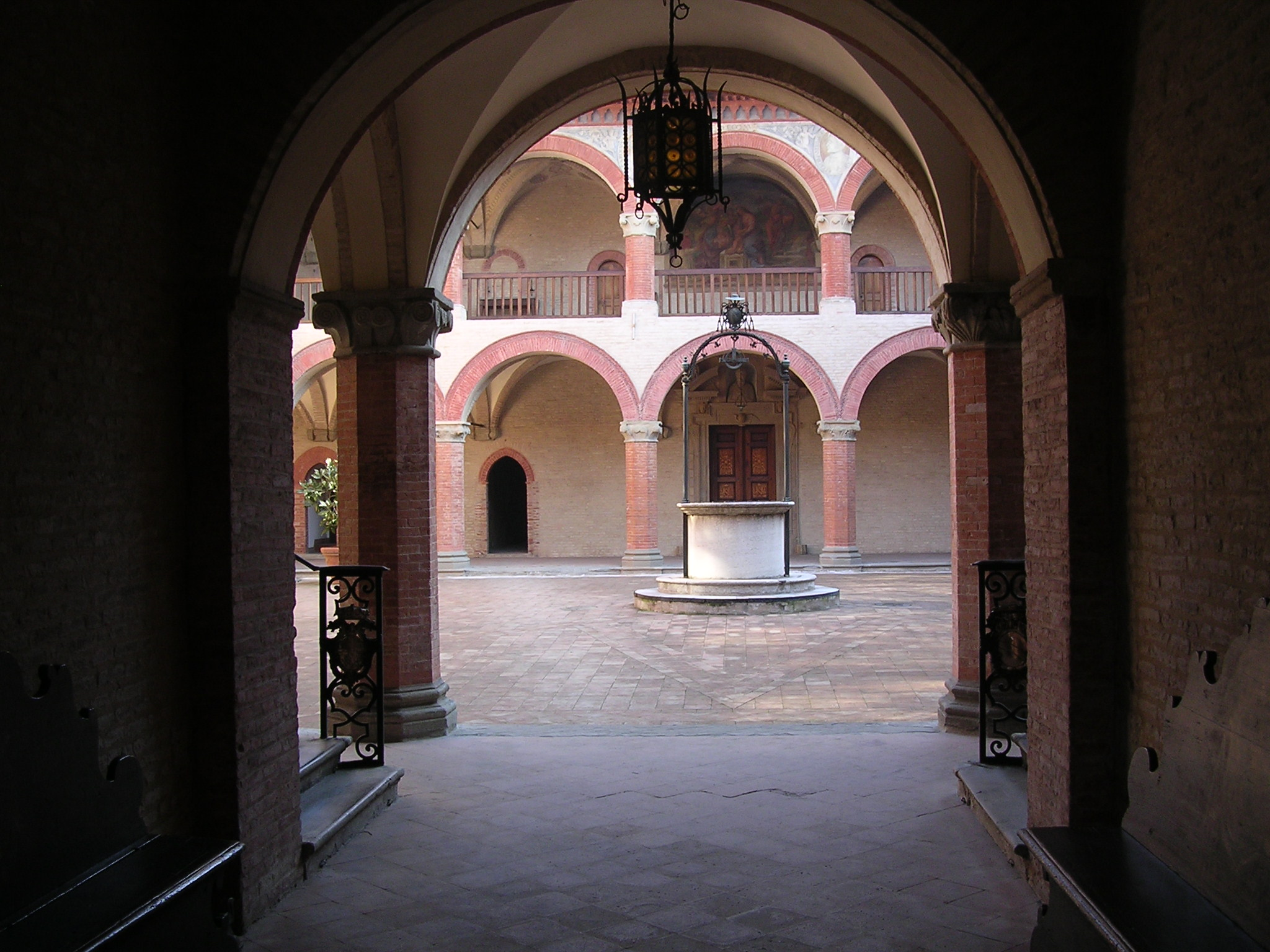
Interior view of the Porticum and Loggia of the Royal Spanish College

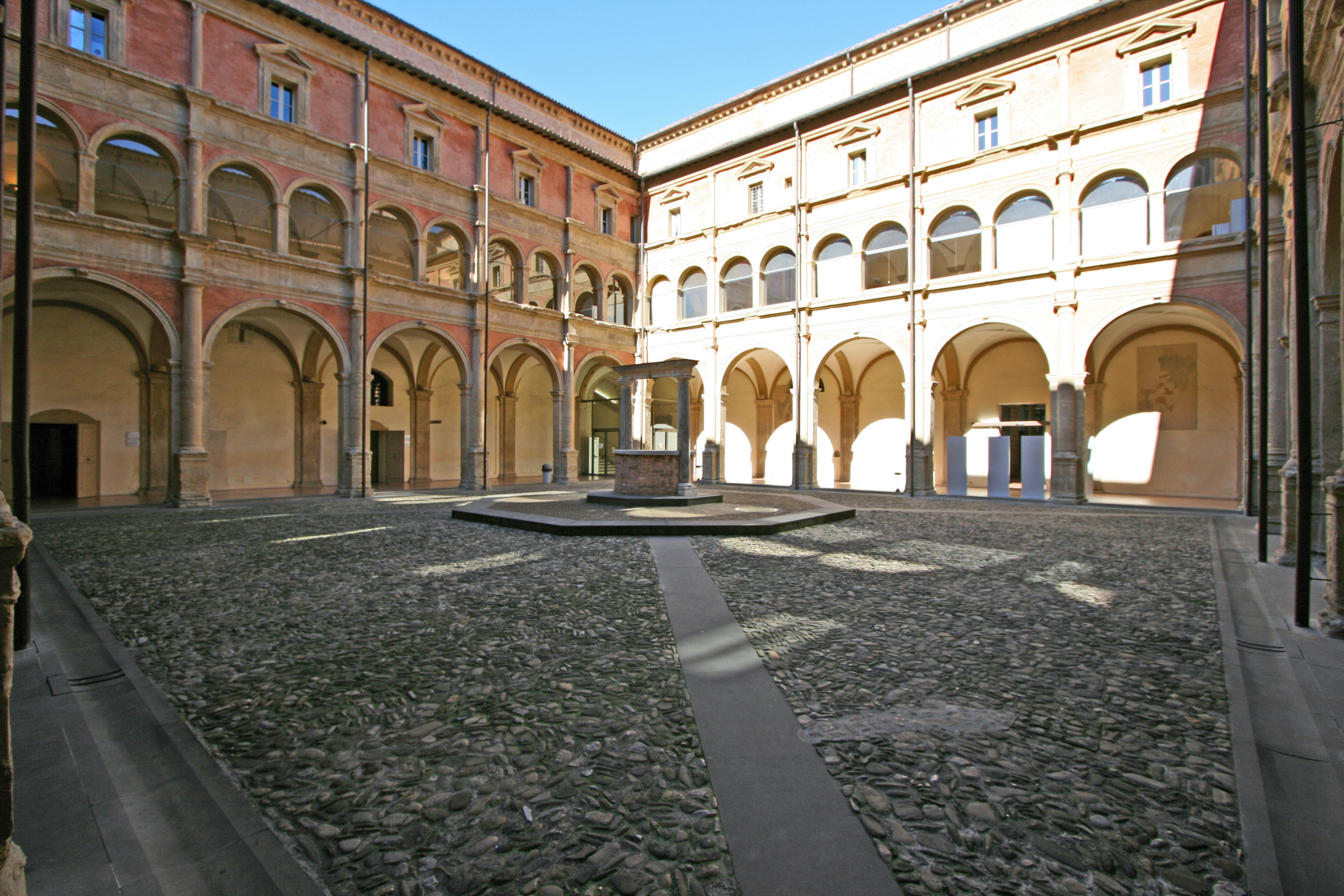
Cloister of San Giovanni in Monte houses the department of History and Cultures (Archeology, History, Paleography and Medieval studies).

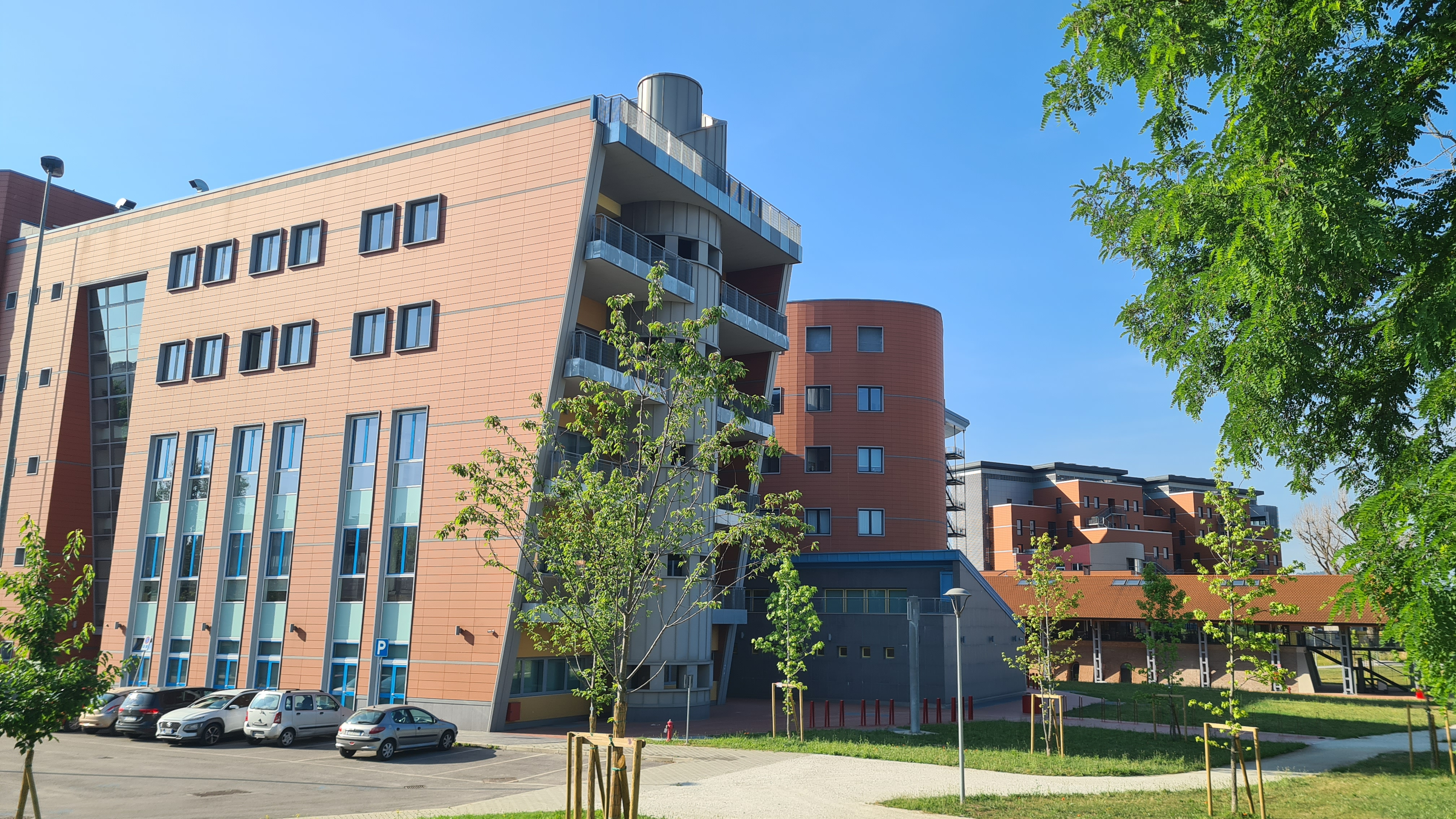
Navile Campus houses the departments of Chemistry, Industrial Chemistry, Pharmacy and Physics and Astronomy.

Higher education processes are being harmonised across the European Community. Nowadays the university offers 101 different "Laurea" or "Laurea breve" first-level degrees (three years of courses), followed by 108 "Laurea specialistica" or "Laurea magistrale" second-level degrees (two years). However 11 other courses have maintained the previous rules of "Laurea specialistica a ciclo unico" or "Laurea magistrale a ciclo unico", with only one cycle of study of five years, except for medicine and dentistry, which require six years of courses. After the "Laurea" one may attain first-level Master (one-year diploma, similar to a postgraduate diploma). After second-level degrees are attained, one may proceed to second-level Master, specialisation schools (residency) or research doctorates (PhD).

The 11 Schools (which replace the existing 23 faculties) are:

- School of Agriculture and Veterinary Medicine
- School of Economics, Management and Statistics
- School of Engineering and Architecture
- School of Foreign Languages and Literature, Interpreting and Translation
- School of Law
- School of Arts, Humanities, and Cultural Heritage
- School of Medicine and Surgery
- School of Pharmacy, Biotechnologies and Sport Sciences
- School of Political Sciences
- School of Psychology and Education Sciences
- School of Sciences

The university is structured in 33 departments (66 until 2012), organized by homogeneous research domains that integrate activities related to one or more faculty. A new department of Latin history was added in 2015.

The 33 departments are:

- Architecture – DA
- Cultural Heritage – DBC
- Chemistry "Giacomo Ciamician" – CHIM
- Industrial Chemistry "Toso Montanari" – CHIMIND
- Arts – DARvipem
- Pharmacy and Biotechnology – FaBiT
- Classical Philology and Italian Studies – FICLIT
- Philosophy and Communication Studies – FILCOM
- Physics and Astronomy – DIFA
- Computer Science and Engineering – DISI
- Civil, Chemical, Environmental, and Materials Engineering – DICAM
- Electrical, Electronic, and Information Engineering "Guglielmo Marconi" – DEI
- Industrial Engineering – DIN
- Interpreting and Translation – DIT
- Modern Languages, Literatures, and Cultures – LILEC
- Mathematics – MAT
- Experimental Medicine, Diagnostic Medicine and Specialty Medicine – DIMES
- Psychology – PSI
- Agricultural Sciences – DipSA
- Management – DiSA
- Biological, Geological, and Environmental Sciences – BiGeA
- Biomedical and Neuromotor Sciences – DIBINEM
- Education Studies "Giovanni Maria Bertin" – EDU
- Agricultural and Food Sciences – DISTAL
- Economics – DSE
- Legal Studies – DSG
- Medical and Surgical Sciences – DIMEC
- Veterinary Medical Sciences – DIMEVET
- Department for Life Quality Studies – QUVI
- Political and Social Sciences – SPS
- Statistical Sciences "Paolo Fortunati" – STAT
- Sociology and Business Law – SDE
- History and Cultures – DiSCi

== Affiliates and other institutions ==
=== Il Mulino ===
In the early 1950s, some students of the University of Bologna were among the founders of the review "il Mulino". On 25 April 1951 the first issue of the review was published in Bologna. In a short time, "il Mulino" became one of the most interesting reference points in Italy for the political and cultural debate and established important editorial relationships in Italy and abroad. Editorial activities evolved along with the review. In 1954, the il Mulino publishing house (It. Società editrice il Mulino) was founded, which today represents one of the most relevant Italian publishers. In addition to this were initiated research projects (focusing mostly on the educational institutions and the political system in Italy), that eventually led, in 1964, to the establishment of the Istituto Carlo Cattaneo.

=== Collegio Superiore ===
The Collegio Superiore is an excellence institution inside the University of Bologna, aimed at promoting students' merit through dedicated learning programmes.

The institution was founded in 1998 as Collegio d'Eccellenza. Together with the Institute for Advanced Study it is part of the Institute for Higher Study.

The Collegio Superiore offers an additional educational path to students enrolled in a degree programme at the University of Bologna, providing specialized courses as part of an interdisciplinary framework.

All students of the Collegio Superiore are granted a full-ride scholarship and additional benefits such as the assistance of a personal tutor and free accommodation at the Residence for Higher Study. In order to remain members of the Collegio Superiore students are required to maintain high marks in both their degree programme and the additional courses.

Beatrice Fraboni, professor of Physics of Matter, has been head of Collegio Superiore since 2019.

== Notable people ==
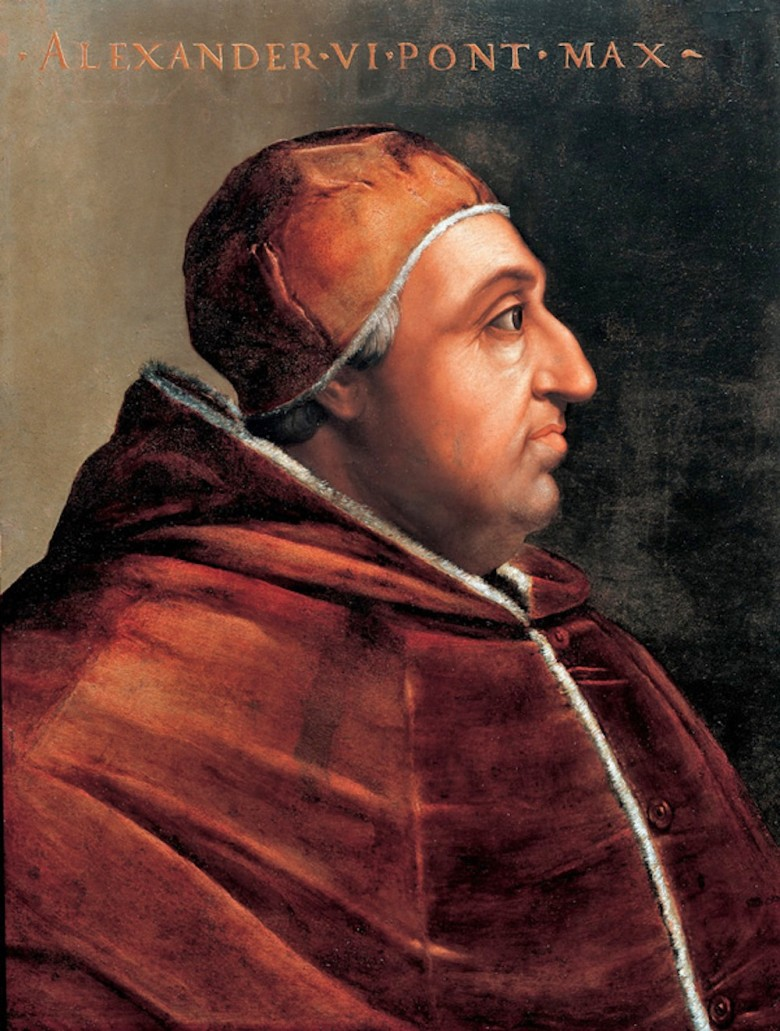
Pope Alexander VI

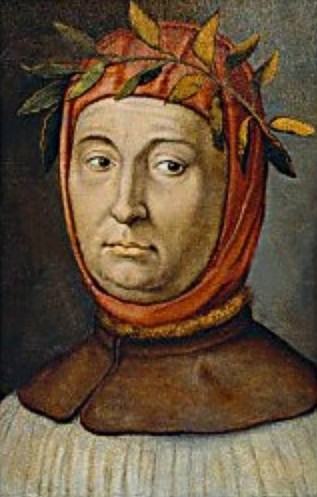
Petrarch

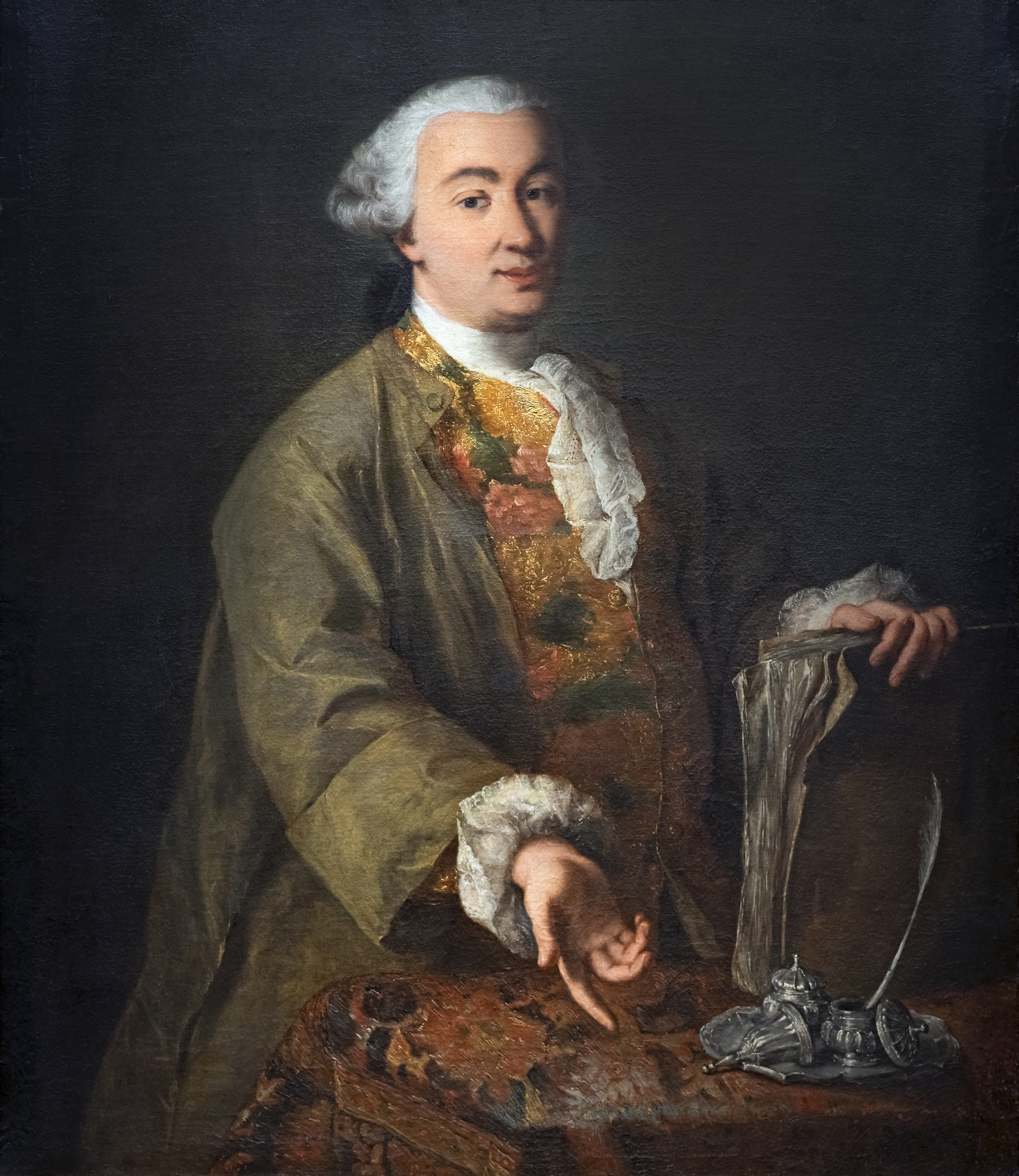
Carlo Goldoni

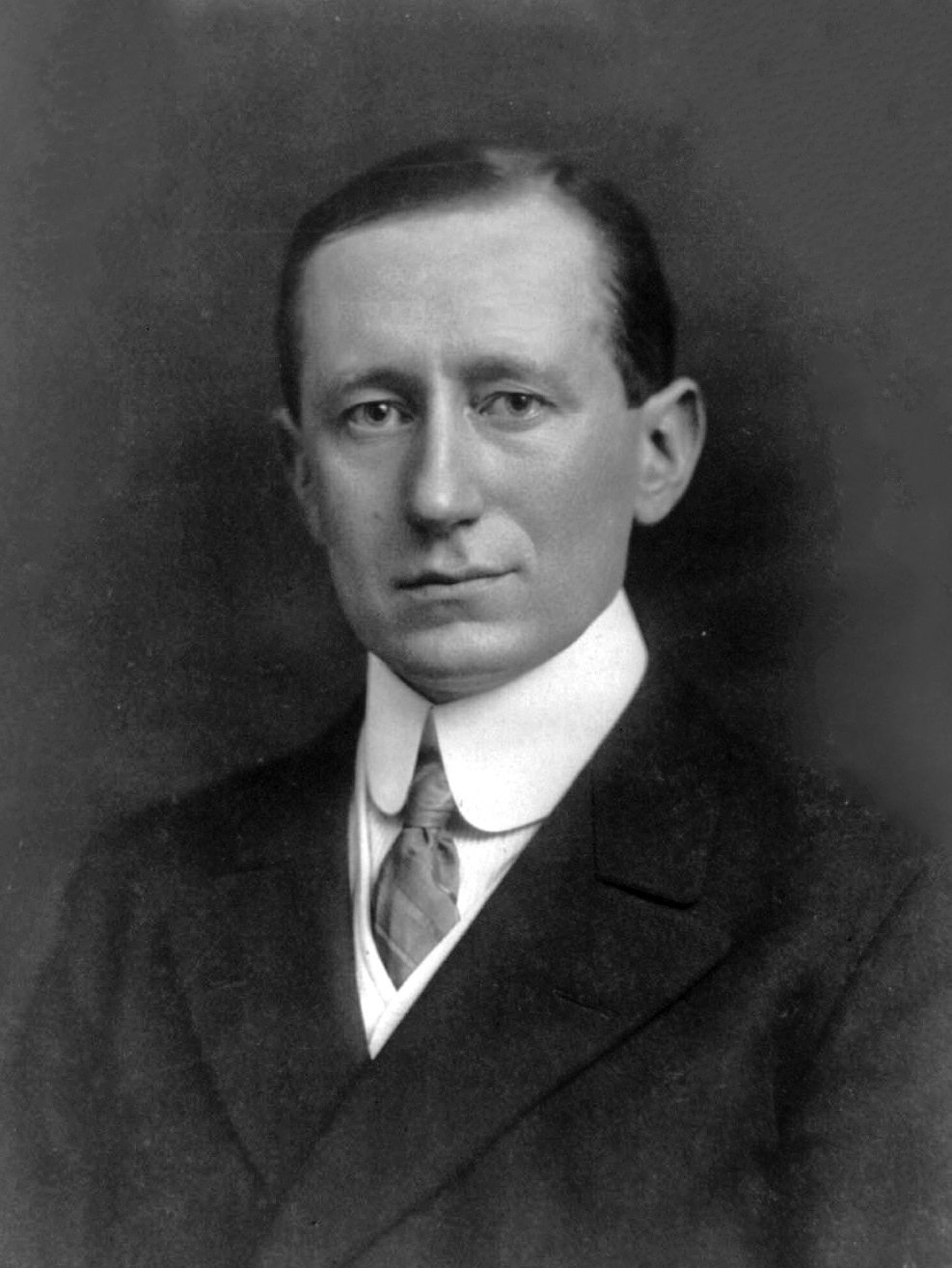
Guglielmo Marconi

=== Alumni ===
- Adone Zoli, former Prime Minister of Italy.
- Cardinal Alberto Bolognetti
- Pope Alexander VI
- Álvaro de Figueroa, former Prime Minister of Spain.
- Anna M. Borghi, Italian cognitive psychologist
- Augusto Righi, pioneer in the study of electromagnetism
- Carlo Goldoni, Italian playwright
- Carlo Rovelli, Italian theoretical physicist
- Carlo Severini
- Saint Charles Borromeo, archbishop of Milan
- Corrado Gini, Italian statistician, demographer and sociologist who developed the Gini coefficient/ratio.
- Dante Alighieri, Italian poet, writer and philosopher
- Daria de Pretis, Italian jurist, Constitutional Judge of the Constitutional Court of Italy.
- Diego Della Valle, chairman of the Italian leather goods company Tod's
- Enzo Ferrari, Italian racing driver, engineer and entrepreneur
- Erasmus of Rotterdam
- Fabrizio Zilibotti, Italian economist and Professor of International and Development Economics at Yale University.
- Fawziya Abikar Nur, Minister for Health and Social Care – Somalia.
- Filip Ivanović, Minister of Foreign Affairs of Montenegro.
- Gabriele Paleotti
- Gasparo Tagliacozzi, pioneer of plastic and reconstructive surgery
- Giacomo Matteotti
- Giovanni Pascoli
- Pope Gregory XIII (Ugo Boncompagni);
- Pope Gregory XV
- Gregorio Ricci-Curbastro, Italian mathematician and the inventor of tensor calculus.
- Guglielmo Marconi, Italian inventor and radio pioneer
- Henry of Susa (Hostiensis);
- Pope Innocent IX
- Irnerius, founder of the School of Glossators
- Joaquín Chapaprieta, former Prime Minister of Spain.
- Juan Fernando López Aguilar, former Minister of Justice – Spain.
- Julius Caesar Aranzi, the pioneer human anatomists and surgeons.
- Kristina Pardalos, Sammarinese jurist
- Laura Bassi, the world's first woman to earn a university chair in a scientific field of studies
- Lazzaro Spallanzani, Italian priest, biologist and physiologist
- Leon Battista Alberti;
- Luigi Galvani;
- Manuel Olivencia, lawyer and academic;
- Mauro Moretti, former CEO and general manager of Leonardo S.p.A.
- Marcello Malpighi;
- Michelangelo Antonioni;
- Nicolaus Copernicus, formulator of the heliocentric universal model;
- Cardinal Paolo Burali d'Arezzo;
- Paracelsus, founder of the discipline of toxicology;
- Patrizio Bianchi, Minister of Public Education in the Draghi Cabinet
- Petrarch;
- Pico della Mirandola;
- Pier Luigi Nervi, Italian Structural engineer and architect of UNESCO Headquarters Paris (1950).
- Pier Paolo Pasolini;
- Pierluigi Collina, Chairman of the FIFA referees committee
- Piero Gnudi, Minister of Tourism and Sports in the Monti cabinet.
- Pietro Mengoli;
- Remo Gaspari, Minister of Relationships with the Parliament and Minister of Public Function in the Bettino Craxi and Giulio Andreotti Cabinet.
- Stefano Domenicali, CEO of Formula One Group, former CEO of Italian sports car manufacturer Automobili Lamborghini S.p.A. and Team Principal of Formula One team Scuderia Ferrari.
- Archbishop Thomas Becket;
- Tommaso Perelli, Italian astronomer
- Torquato Tasso;
- Ulisse Aldrovandi;
- Umberto Eco, Italian semiotician, philosopher and writer
- Mihalj Šilobod Bolšić (1724–1787), Catholic priest, mathematician, writer, and musical theorist primarily known for writing the first Croatian arithmetic textbook Arithmatika Horvatzka (published in Zagreb, 1758)
- Bruno D'Amore, mathematician

=== Faculty and staff ===
Notable former faculty include:

- 11th century
  - Irnerius
- 12th century
  - Bulgarus
  - Gratian
  - Martinus Gosia
  - Patriarch Heraclius of Jerusalem
  - William of Tyre
- 13th century
  - Benvenutus Scotivoli
  - Bettisia Gozzadini
  - Guido Guinizelli
  - Henry of Susa (Hostiensis)
  - Paul, Dominican martyr
  - Sylvester Gozzolini
  - William of Saliceto
- 14th century
  - Manuel Chrysoloras
  - Giovanni de' Marignolli
  - Francesco Petrarca (also known as Petrarch)
  - Coluccio Salutati
- 15th century
  - Leon Battista Alberti
  - Nicolaus Copernicus
  - Lippo Bartolomeo Dardi
  - Yuriy Drohobych (also known as Georgius de Drohobycz)
  - Giovanni Pico della Mirandola
- 16th century
  - Ulisse Aldrovandi
  - Giovanni Antonio Magini
  - Camillo Baldi
  - Girolamo Cardano
  - Ignazio Danti
  - Giovanni Della Casa
  - Girolamo Maggi
  - Virgilio Malvezzi
  - Paracelsus
  - Giulio Sirenio
- 17th century
  - Giovanni Cassini
  - Bonaventura Cavalieri
  - Niall Ó Glacáin
  - Marcello Malpighi
  - Pietro Mengoli
  - Lodovico Scapinelli
- 18th century
  - Laura Bassi
  - Luigi Galvani
  - Maria Gaetana Agnesi
  - Carlo Goldoni
- 19th century
  - Augusto Righi
  - Giacomo Ciamician
  - Giosuè Carducci
  - Giovanni Pascoli
  - Pellegrino Rossi
  - Francesco Selmi
- 20th century
  - Umberto Eco
  - Beppo Levi
  - Guglielmo Marconi
  - Pier Paolo Pasolini
  - Maria Matilde Principi
  - Romano Prodi
- 21st century
  - Hamida Barmaki
  - Özalp Babaoğlu
  - Gabriella Campadelli-Fiume
  - Pier Cesare Bori
  - Augusto Barbera
  - Gualtiero Calboli
  - Ivano Dionigi
  - Luciano Floridi

== Rankings and reputation ==
University rankings

Global – Overall
- ARWU World: 201–300 (2024)
- CWUR World: 201 (2024)
- CWTS World: 113 (2024)
- QS World: =123 (2027)
- THE World: =111 (2027)
- USNWR Global: =150 (2026–27)

The 2027 QS World University Rankings ranked the University of Bologna 123rd in the world as well as 66th with specific reference to academic reputation. In another measurement by the same organization, it was positioned among the world's top 100 universities for graduate employability.

In the 2027 Times Higher Education World University Rankings, it claimed the 111th place globally. In the 2023 THE Impact Rankings, which measure the universities' commitment to sustainable development in compliance with the UN 2030 Agenda, Bologna took 5th place in Europe and 23rd in the world.

== Points of interest ==
- Orto Botanico dell'Università di Bologna
- L'Orto Agrario "Filippo Re" (in Italian) (Translate to English: Google, Bing, Yandex)

== See also ==
- Bologna declaration
- Bologna Process
- List of medieval universities
- List of universities in Italy
- Medieval university
