= Wax sculpture =

Depiction made by waxy substances

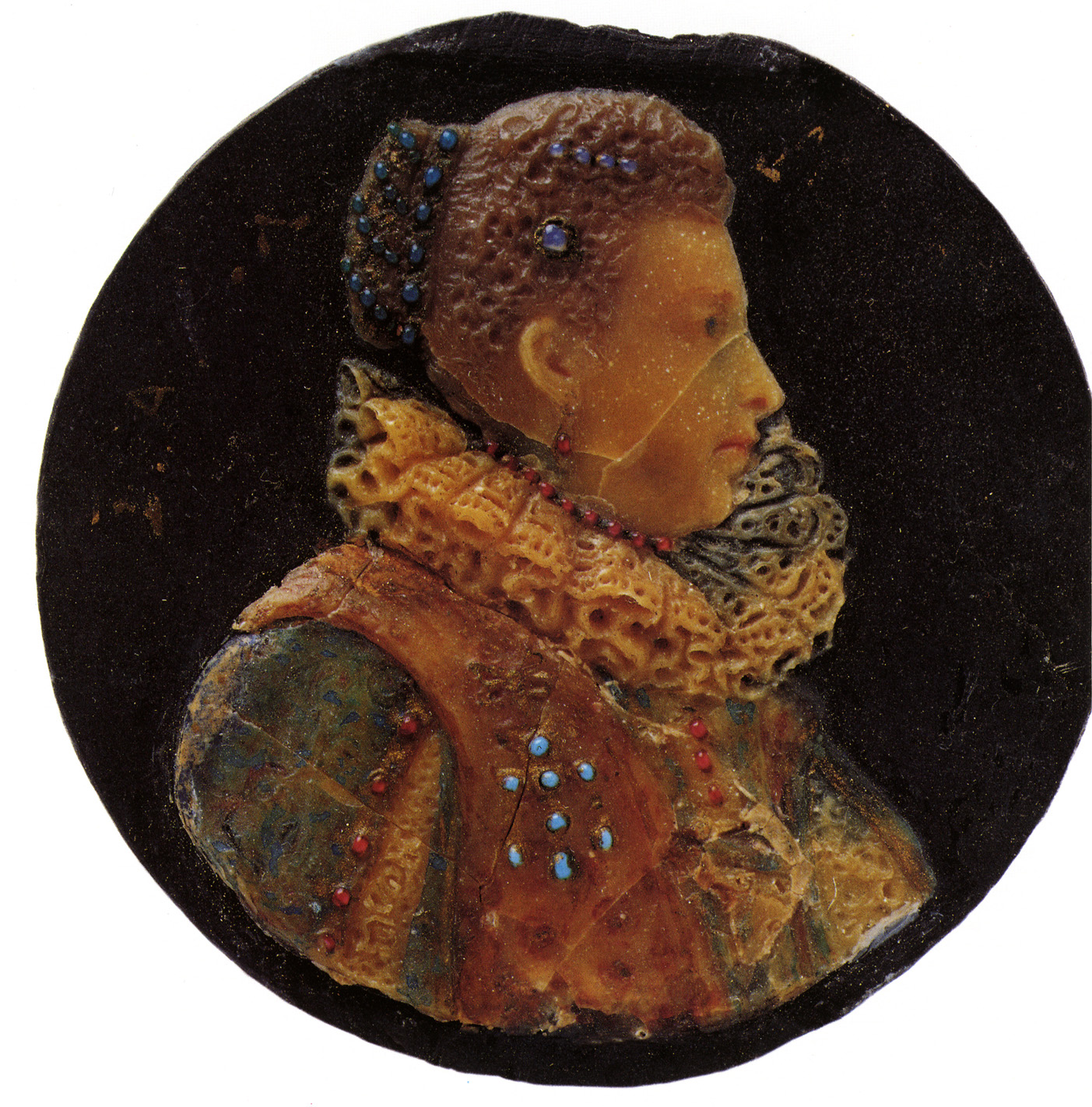
Anna of Tyrol by Alessandro Abondio, 1618

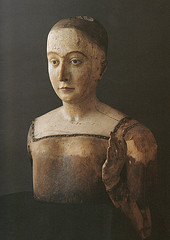
The funeral effigy (without clothes) of Elizabeth of York, mother of King Henry VIII, 1503, Westminster Abbey

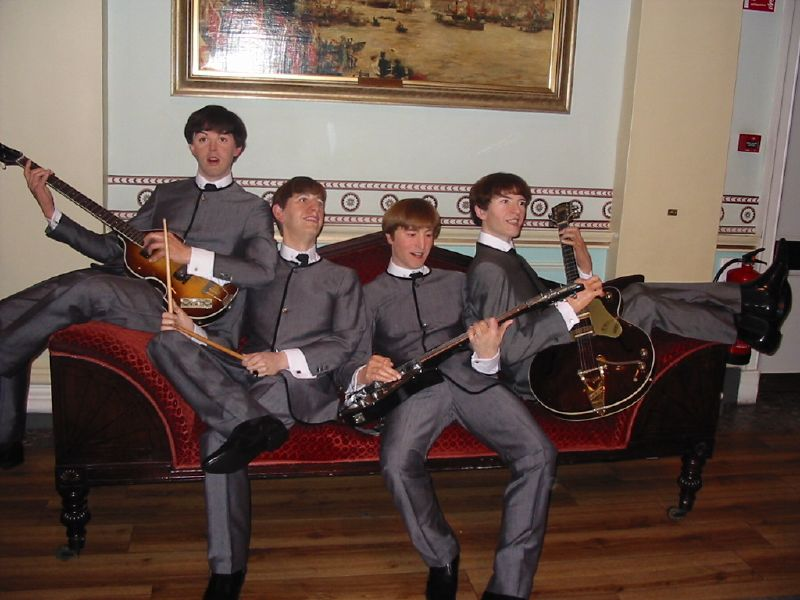
The Beatles at Madame Tussauds London

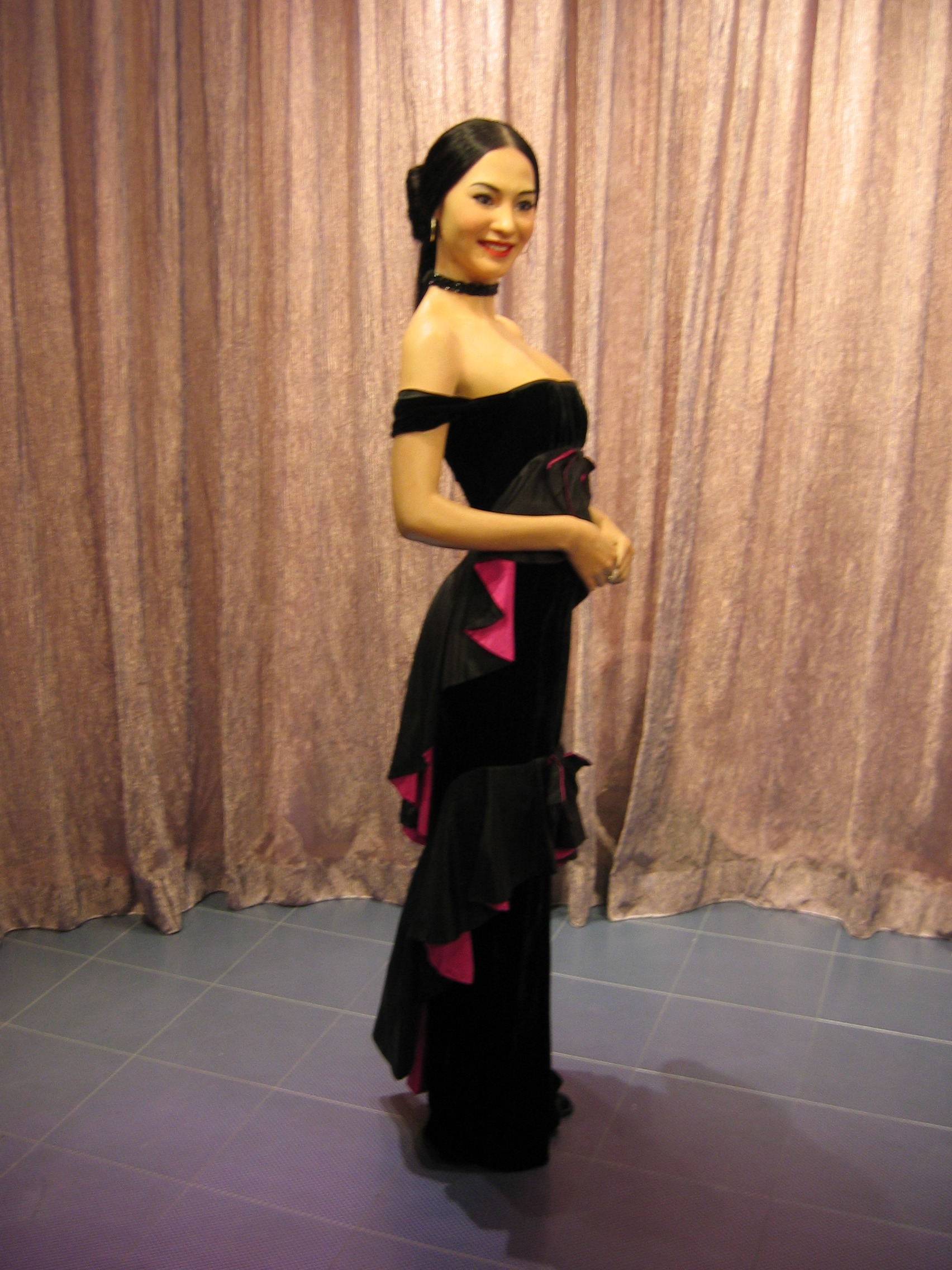
Cecilia Cheung at Madame Tussauds Hong Kong

A wax sculpture is a depiction made using a waxy substance. Often these are effigies, usually of a notable individual, but there are also death masks and scenes with many figures, mostly in relief.

The properties of beeswax make it an excellent medium for preparing figures and models, either by modeling or by casting in molds. It can easily be cut and shaped at room temperature, melts at a low temperature, mixes with any coloring matter, takes surface tints well, and its texture and consistency may be modified by the addition of earthy matters and oils or fats. When molten, it is highly responsive to impressions from a mold and, once it sets and hardens, its form is relatively resilient against ordinary temperature variations, even when it is cast in thin laminae. These properties have seen wax used for modelling since the Middle Ages and there is testimony for it having been used for making masks (particularly death masks) in ancient Rome. The death masks of illustrious ancestors would be displayed by the elite holding the right of "ius imaginem."

== History ==
=== Ancient world ===
Figures in wax of their deities were used in the funeral rites of the ancient Egyptians, and deposited among other offerings in their graves; many of these are now preserved in museums. That the Egyptians also modelled fruits can be learned from numerous allusions in early literature. Among the Greeks during their best art period, wax figures were largely used as dolls for children; statuettes of deities were modelled for votive offerings and for religious ceremonies, and wax images to which magical properties were attributed were treasured by the people. Wax figures and models held a still more important place among the ancient Romans. The masks (effigies or imagines) of ancestors, modelled in wax, were preserved by patrician families, this jus imaginum being one of the privileges of the nobles, and these masks were exposed to view on ceremonial occasions, and carried in their funeral processions. The closing days of the Saturnalia were known as sigillaria, on account of the custom of making, towards the end of the festival, presents of wax models of fruits and waxen statuettes which were fashioned by the Sigillarii.

=== Early modern Europe ===
The display of temporary or permanent effigies in wax and other media of the deceased was a common part of the funeral ceremonies of important people in European historical times. Most of the figures wore the real clothes of the deceased so they could be made quickly. The museum of Westminster Abbey has a collection of British royal wax effigies, as well as those of figures such as the naval hero Horatio Nelson, and Frances Stewart, Duchess of Richmond, who also had her parrot stuffed and displayed. The effigy of Charles II of England (1680) was displayed over his tomb until the early 19th century, when all were removed from the abbey itself.

Nelson's effigy was a pure tourist attraction, commissioned the year after his death in 1805, and his burial in St Paul's Cathedral after a government decision that major public figures should in future be buried there. Concerned for their revenue from visitors, the Abbey decided it needed a rival attraction for admirers of Nelson.

=== Middle Ages ===
The practice of wax modelling can be traced through the Middle Ages, when votive offerings of wax figures were made to churches. The memory and lineaments of monarchs and great personages were preserved by means of wax masks.

During this period, superstition found expression in the formation of wax images of hated persons, into which long pins were thrust, in the confident expectation that thereby deadly injury would be induced to the person represented. This practice was considered more effective when some portion of the victim's hair or nails were added to the wax figure, thus strengthening the connection with its actual subject. This belief and practice continued until the 17th century, though the superstition survived into the 19th century. In the Scottish Highlands, a clay model of an enemy was found in a stream in 1885, having been placed there in the belief that, as the clay was washed away, so would the health of the hated one decline.

=== Renaissance ===
During the Italian Renaissance, modeling in wax took a position of high importance, and it was practised by some of the greatest of the early masters, both as a material to create models for sculpture in other materials and as a medium to be used on its own. Speaking of the sculptor Lorenzo Ghiberti, Giorgio Vasari noted that "Lorenzo did not cease to study the arts of design, and to work in relief with wax, stucco, and other similar materials, knowing very well that these small reliefs are the drawing-exercises of sculptors, and that without such practice nothing can be brought by them to perfection." The bronze medallions of Pisanello, Francesco Francia and of the other famous medalists owe their value to the properties of wax: all early bronzes and metalwork were cast from wax models first.

Wax effigies were a form of three-dimensional portraiture able to render uncanny likenesses of the subjects depicted. The creations of Florentine wax worker Orsino Benintendi (c.1440-98) were praised by Vasari as "lifelike and so well made that they no longer resembled wax men but living ones."

The Victoria and Albert Museum has a wax 'Descent from the Cross' by Jacopo Sansovino which was probably used by painters Perugino and del Sarto as well as a small study of a slave by Michelangelo and several wax pieces by Giambologna. Particularly noteworthy is his 'Florence Triumphant over Pisa' modello. The Royal Collection's red chalk écorché attributed to Michelangelo is considered as a drawing of a wax model like those Michelangelo himself made. The British Museum has a wax portrait medallion of Michelangelo made from life in 1560 by Leone Leoni.

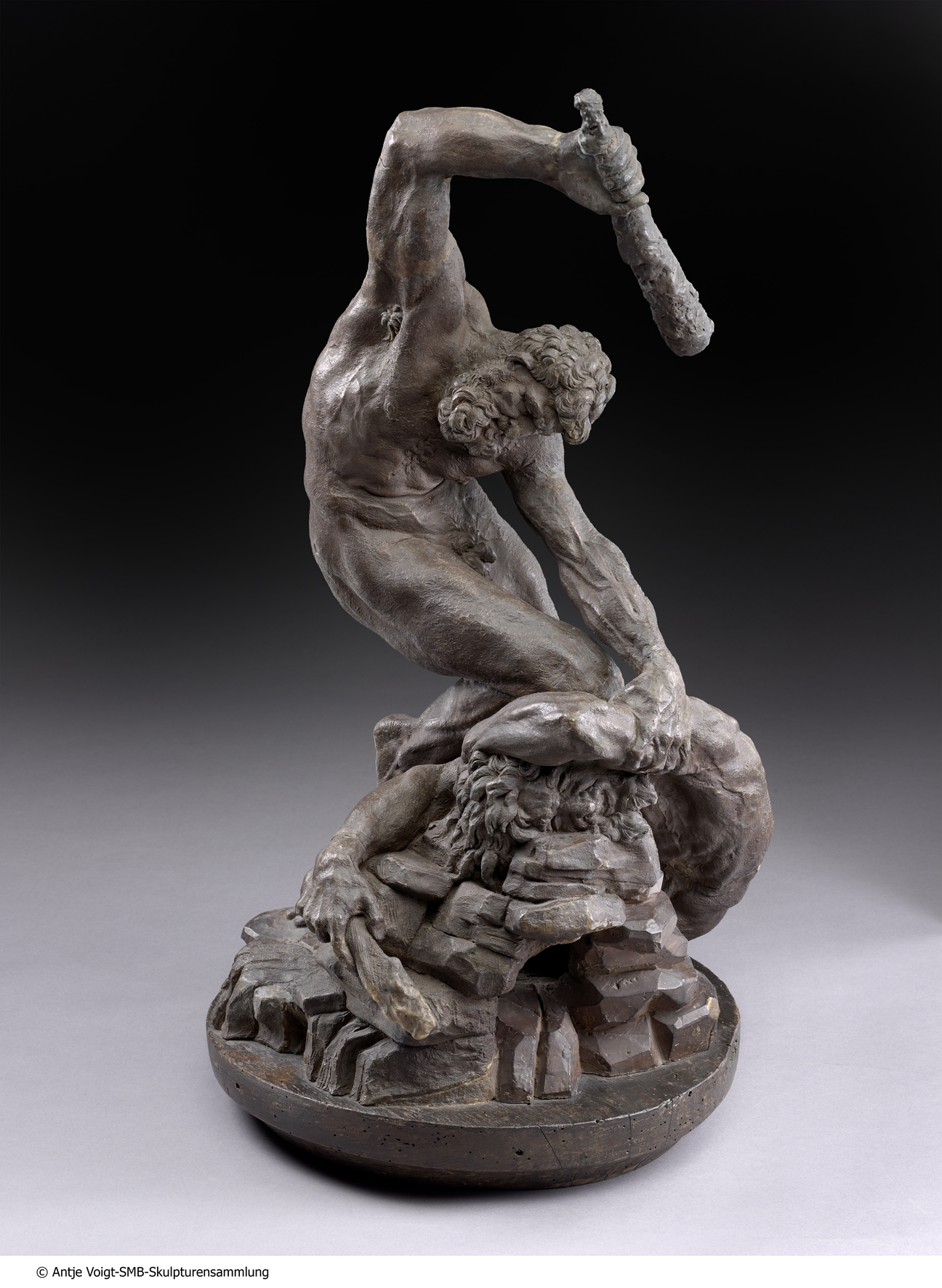
Baccio Bandinelli, Hercules and Cacus, c. 1525, painted wax (on wood base), Bode Museum, Berlin

Two wax modelli by Baccio Bandinelli still exist, one of 'Hercules and Cacus' (Bode Museum, Berlin, Ident. Nr. 2612) and the other of Neptune (Musée Fabre, Montpellier).

The Museo Nazionale del Bargello in Florence has the only surviving wax modello by Benvenuto Cellini, 'Perseo con la testa di Medusa' (inv. cere, n.424), a study for his bronze statue at the Loggia dei Lanzi.

The Rijksmuseum has the 'Genius of Cosimo I de' Medici', a modello in red wax by Bartolomeo Ammannati.

=== 16th and 17th centuries ===
There are a number of very high quality wax figures from the 16th and 17th centuries, mostly portrait figures and religious or mythological scenes, often with many figures. Antonio Abondio (1538–91) pioneered the coloured wax portrait miniature in relief, working mainly for the Habsburg and other courts of Northern Europe, and his son Alessandro continued in his footsteps.

=== 18th century ===
Bologna was an important centre for anatomical wax modelling in the 18th century with Ercole Lelli, Giovanni Manzolini and his wife Anna Morandi Manzolini. The Museo di Palazzo Poggi shows a wax portrait of her husband dissecting a heart and one of herself dissecting a brain as well as anatomical models of the eye. The anatomy room also displays a series of figures by Ercole Lelli and a copy of Florentine Clemente Susini’s once famous Medici Venus. The museum of the Medical University of Vienna houses a large collection of Susini's wax models, while the University of Bologna houses the Luigi Cattaneo Anatomical Wax Museum.

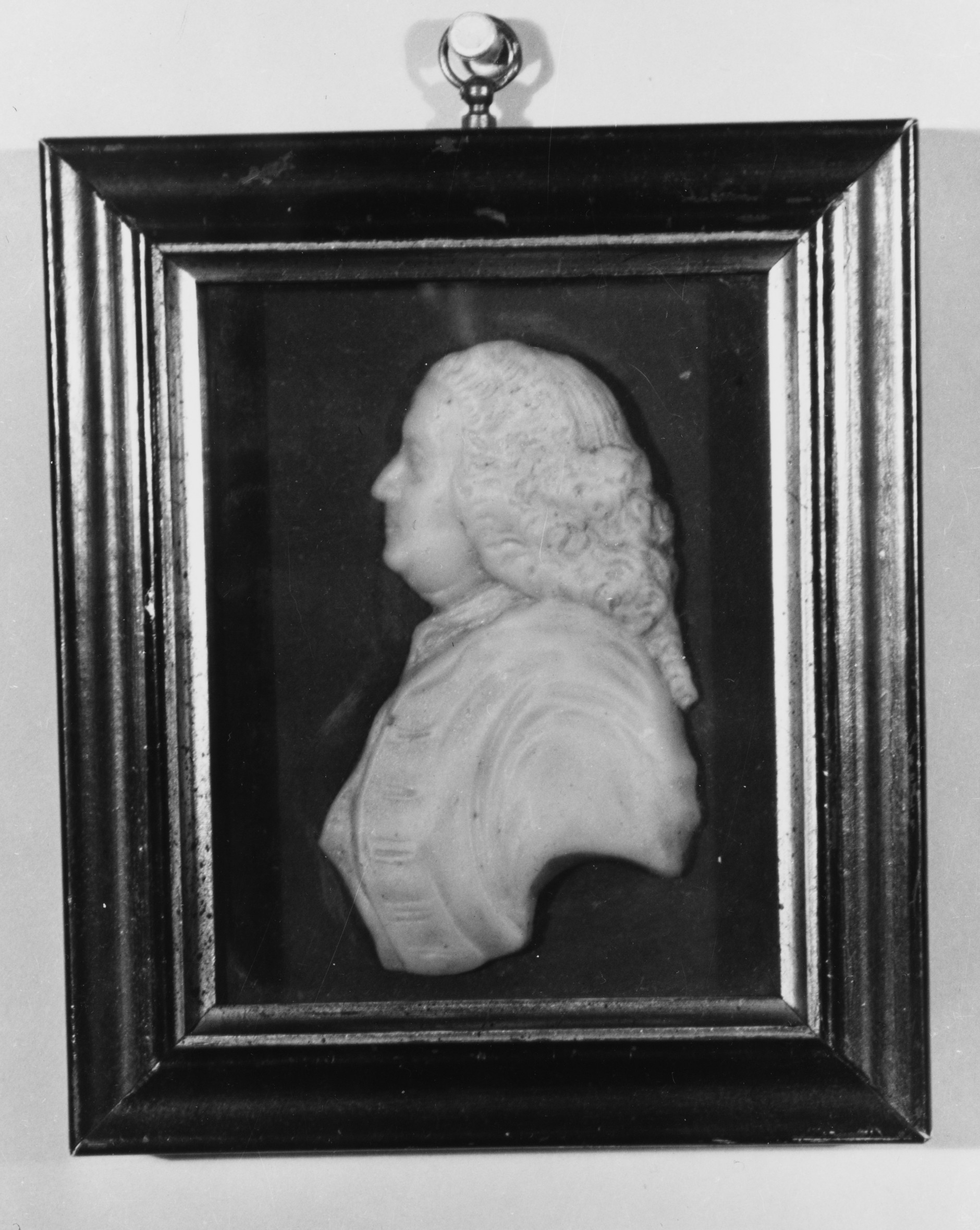
Wax profile bust of Benjamin Franklin by Patience Wright, c. 1775

Patience Wright, was a sculptor of wax figures, and the first recognized American-born sculptor.

The Royal Collection Trust owns a wax bust of George III by Samuel Percy (1750-1820) and several engravings made after wax portraits like Jean-Charles François's portrait of Josephus II (1751) after wax modeller Florian Zeiss (1712–80). Other artists were inspired by wax works by Leonhard Posch or Josef Müller (fl.1793).

Towards the close of the 18th century, modeling of medallion portraits and of relief groups, the latter frequently polychromatic, was in considerable vogue throughout Europe. Many of the artists were women. John Flaxman executed in wax many portraits and other relief figures which Josiah Wedgwood translated into pottery for his Jasperware. The National Portrait Gallery has 40 wax portraits, mostly from this period.

=== 19th century ===
This was a time when artists were often inspired by phrenologists or physiognomonists. This was the case of Jean-Pierre Dantan, or David d'Angers, for example, the latter even belonged to the Société phrénologique de Paris founded by François Broussais in 1831. As for Moulageur and sculptor Joseph Towne, he is best known for the creation of anatomical wax models.

In the 19th century, a painter like Ernest Meissonier still used wax models to prepare his paintings, like 'Le voyageur' (Musée d'Orsay, RF 3672) while Rodin made a wax model of The Gates of Hell (1880). Among the major wax works of the period are Paul Gauguin's portrait of his daughter Aline (1881, musée d'Orsay), and a 125 cm high self-portrait of Jean-Joseph Carriès (Petit Palais). Edgar Degas used to model in wax to study the poses of his dancers and bathers. These were simple studies that he did not want to keep, but some were nevertheless cast in bronze after his death, such as 'Danseuse regardant la plante de son pied droit', in the Musée d'Orsay, Paris (RF 2771: wax; RF 2096: bronze). Other famous wax modellers included Richard Cockle Lucas, Jules Dalou, Medardo Rosso or David d'Angers.

The famous wax bust attributed to Leonardo da Vinci acquired in 1909 by the Museum of Berlin is the work of an English forger who worked about 1840. The wax model of a head, at the Wicar Museum at Lille, belongs probably to the school of Canova.

Wax flower and fruit sculptures were popular in the 1840s and 1850s in Britain, with noted sculptors including the London-based Emma Peachey and the Mintorn family. There was a section for this work at the Great Exhibition of 1851. Wax flowers became popular in many parts of Europe in the same time period, and the Swedish wax flower sculptors Emma Fürstenhoff and Fredrika Ramstedt both had international careers.

=== Today ===
Wax-works, not intended as fine art, subsequently became popular attractions, consisting principally of images of historical or notorious personages, made up of waxen masks on lay figures in which sometimes mechanism is fitted to give motion to the figure. Such an exhibition of wax-works with mechanical motions was shown in Germany early in the eighteenth century.

Waxworks are frequently made presented by contemporary artists who take advantage of its lifelike and uncanny qualities. While the artist often creates a wax self-portrait, there are examples too of imaginary personalities and historical personae. For example, Gavin Turk had his portrait made as Sid Vicious ("Pop", Waxwork in vitrine 279 x 115 x 115 cm, 1993), Jan Fabre as a notorious thief (homage to Jacques Mesrine (Bust) II, 2008. Lifesize. Private collection.ta.) Eleanor Crook’s bronze sculpture Santa Medicina in London’s Science Museum has a wax “patient” modelled at half life size sheltered in a vitrine within its robes.

The museum of medieval torture instruments in Amsterdam also used wax figures in order to demonstrate the use of machines and tools of their display.

== Use in moulage ==
The modeling of the soft parts of dissections, teaching illustrations of anatomy, was first practised at Florence during the Renaissance. The practice of moulage, or the depiction of human anatomy and different diseases taken from directly casting from the body using (in the early period) gelatine moulds, later alginate or silicone moulds, used wax as its primary material (later to be replaced by latex and rubber). Some moulages were directly cast from the bodies of diseased subjects, others from healthy subjects to which disease features (blisters, sores, growths, rashes) were skilfully applied with wax and pigments.

During the 19th century, moulage evolved into three-dimensional, realistic representations of diseased parts of the human body. These can be seen in many European medical museums, notably the Spitzner collection currently in Brussels, the Charite Hospital museum in Berlin and the Gordon Museum of Pathology at Guy's Hospital in London.

== Wax museums ==
A wax museum or waxworks consists of a collection of wax figures representing famous people from history and contemporary personalities exhibited in lifelike poses. Wax museums often have a special section dubbed the "chamber of horrors" in which the more grisly exhibits are displayed.

- Madame Tussauds
  - Madame Tussauds London
  - Madame Tussauds New York
  - Madame Tussauds Hong Kong
  - Madame Tussauds Amsterdam
- Hollywood Wax Museum
  - Hollywood Wax Museum Branson
  - Hollywood Wax Museum Pigeon Forge
  - Hollywood Wax Museum Myrtle Beach
- Musée Grévin Paris
  - Musée Grévin Montreal
  - Musée Grévin Séoul
- National Wax Museum (Ireland)
- Waxworks museum of the Castle of Diósgyőr
- Panoptikum Hamburg

== Gallery ==
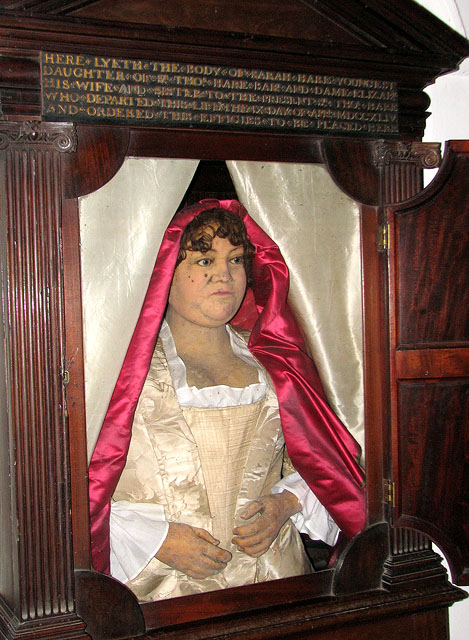
Funerary effigy of Sarah Hare, who died in 1744, Holy Trinity church, Stow Bardolph, Norfolk

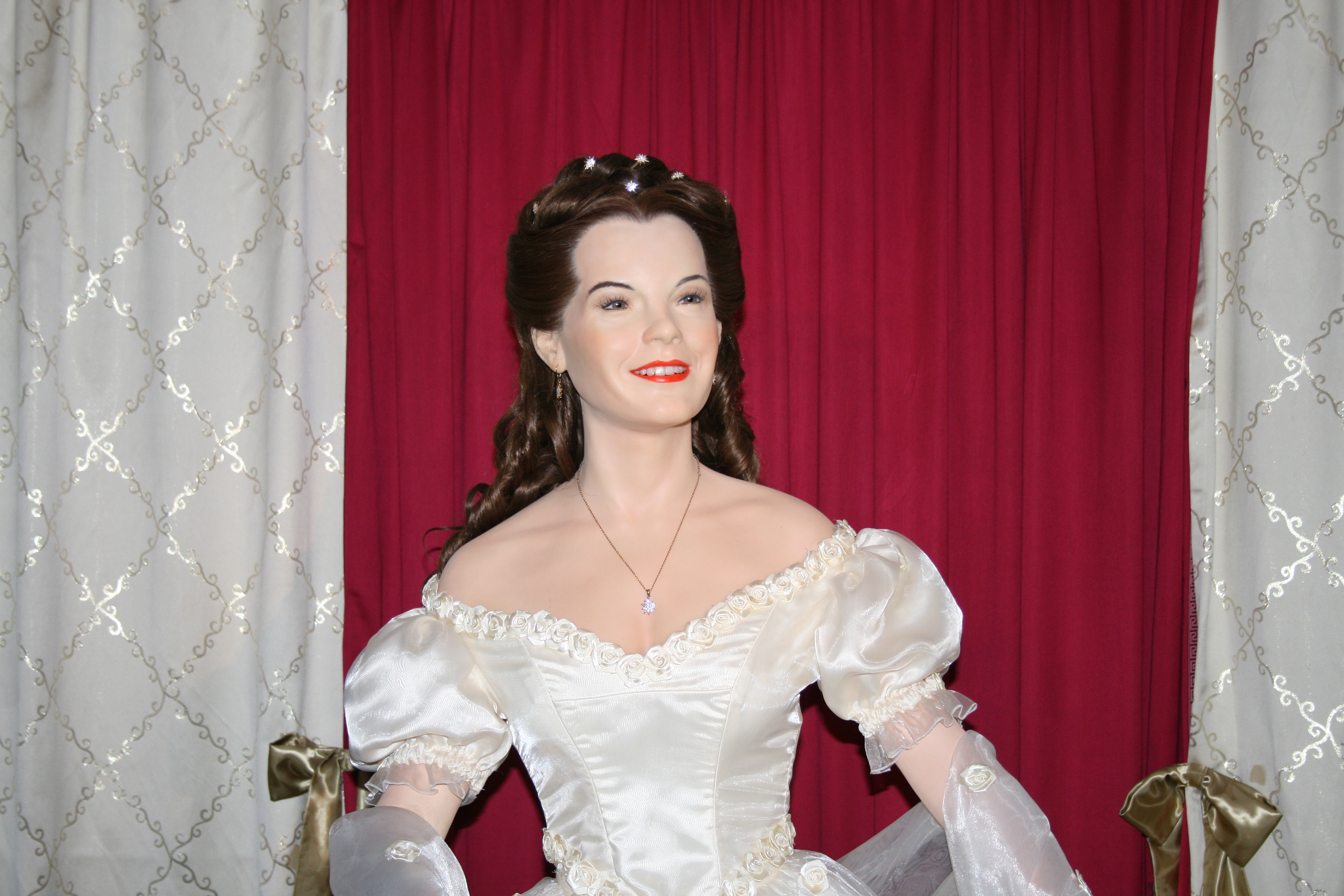
Wax figure of Romy Schneider as Elisabeth of Bavaria (Sissi) at Panoptikum Hamburg.

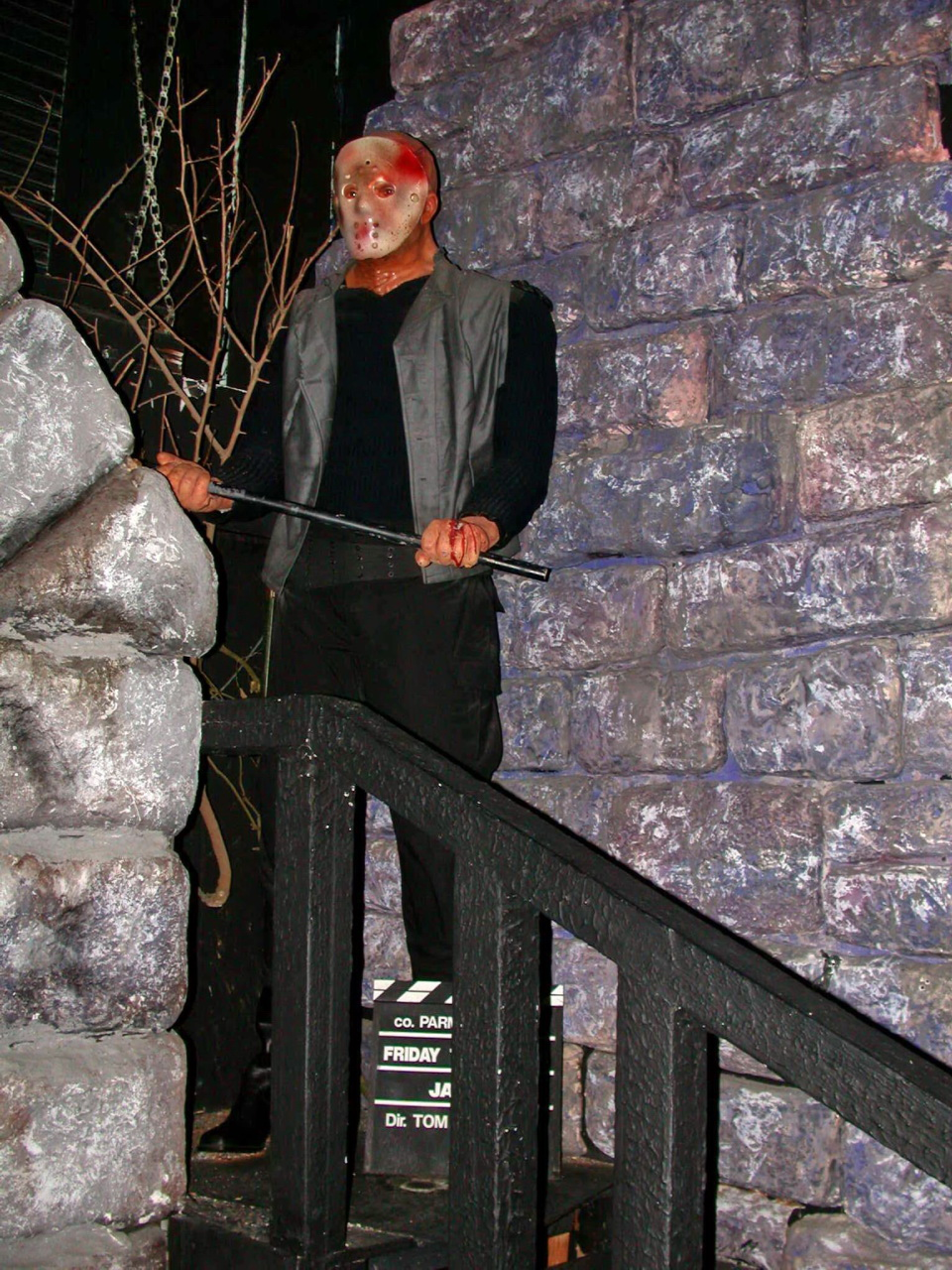
Wax figure of Jason Voorhees

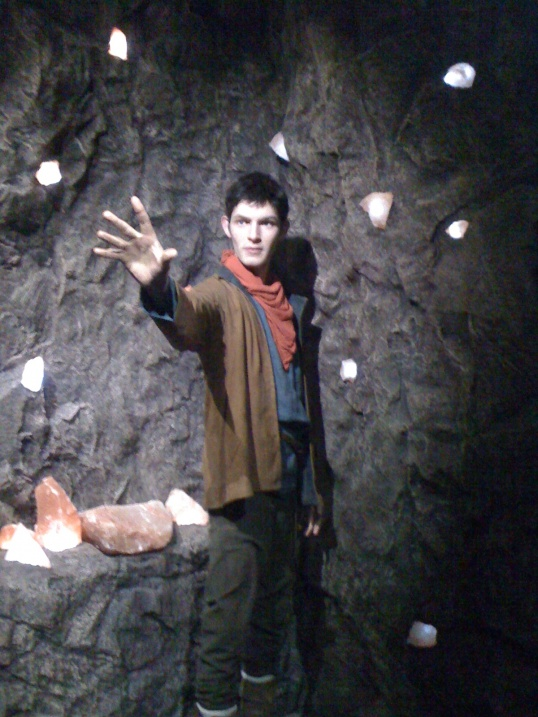
Wax figure of Colin Morgan as Merlin at Warwick Castle

== Sources ==
- (in English) Moulage
- (in English) Antiquity of Tantricism (use of wax figures mentioned)
