= Nakhlband =

Persian craft of making artificial trees and flowers

Nakhlband (Persian: نخلبندی) is a Persian craft of making artificial trees and flowers. The trees and the flowers, the fruit and the miniature gardens were long produced by distinctive craftsmen called the nakhlband. This term has an Arabic root and a Persian ending meaning "a maker of artificial flowers," but it may also have the meaning of a "festoon maker." Paper, paste, wax, and paint were the ingredients of this minor art, with the most costly and elegant productions carried out in coloured wax.
