= Lucy Hobbs Taylor =

American dentist (1833–1910)

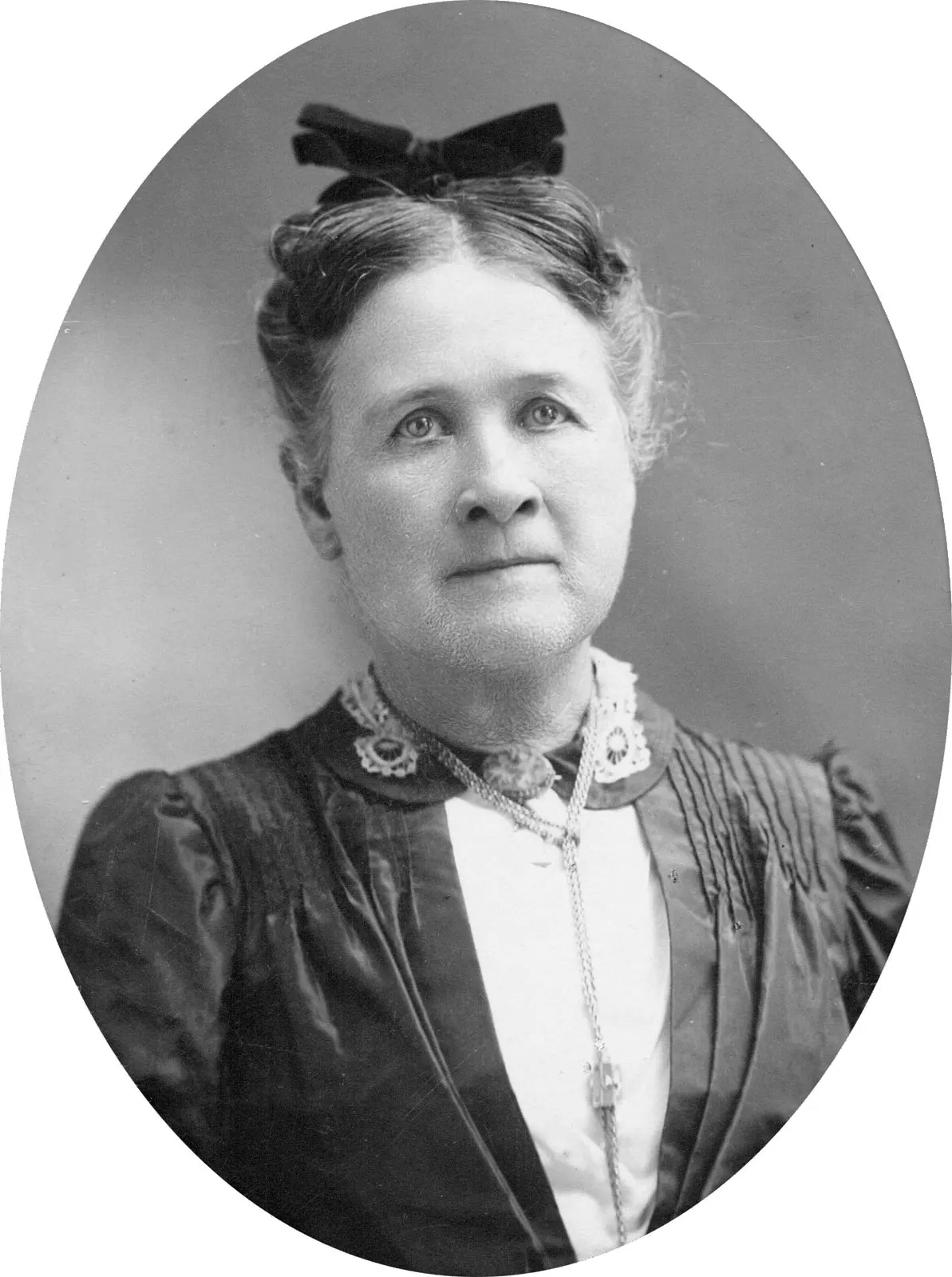
- Taylor in 1903
- Born: March 14, 1833; Constable, New York, U.S.
- Died: October 3, 1910 (aged 77); Lawrence, Kansas, U.S.
- Education: Ohio College of Dental Surgery
- Scientific career
- Fields: Dentistry

Lucy Hobbs Taylor (March 14, 1833 – October 3, 1910) was an American dentist, known for being the first woman to graduate from dental school (Ohio College of Dental Surgery in 1866).

She was originally denied admittance to the Eclectic Medical College in Cincinnati, Ohio, owing to her gender. Due to this, a professor in the college agreed to tutor her and encouraged her to practice dentistry.

Once again, she applied to a dentistry school, this time Ohio College of Dentistry. She was once again refused admittance due to her gender. From there, a college graduate agreed to tutor her, allowing her to continue her studies towards dentistry. In 1861, she decided to open her own practice instead of attempting to get into a college once again. After a year, she moved to Iowa and opened a dentistry practice. This allowed her to be accepted as a dentist without the diploma and become part of the Iowa State Dental Society.

As part of this she was also serving as the group's delegate to the American Dental Associate Convention, only three years after moving to Iowa. With great coincidence, that same year (1865) the Ohio College of Dentistry decided to waive the policy prohibiting women being admitted to the institution. Instantly, Taylor enrolled as a senior student thanks to her dentistry experience she had accumulated over the years. She graduated in 1866, becoming the first woman in the world to graduate from a dental college, and to receive a doctorate in dentistry.

== Early life ==
Lucy Beaman Hobbs was born on March 14, 1833, in Constable, New York. She was seventh out of ten children total. When she was 12 she obtained a job as a seamstress to support her siblings. Hobbs subsequently attended school and eventually graduated from Franklin Academy in New York and began teaching for ten years in Michigan. In 1859, she moved to Cincinnati and applied to medical school at Eclectic Medical College. Hobbs was denied entrance because of her gender, but she was able to study privately under the supervision of a teacher from Eclectic. Subsequently, Hobbs applied to the Ohio College of Dentistry. When she was refused admission to dental school, she began a private program of study with a professor, Jonathan Taft, from the Ohio College of Dental Surgery. Hobbs applied once more to the dentistry program, but was again rejected. As a response, she opened up her own practice, allowing her to practice dentistry without having to obtain a diploma.

== Dental career ==
After studying dentistry, she started her own practice in Cincinnati in 1861. She soon moved to Bellevue and then McGregor, Iowa, where she spent three years. In 1865, she finally gained professional recognition and was allowed to join the Iowa State Dental Society, and was sent as a delegate to the American Dental Association convention in Chicago. That November, she entered the Ohio College of Dental Surgery as a senior, where on February 21, 1866, she earned her doctorate in dentistry, becoming the first woman in the world to graduate from a dental college, and to receive a doctorate in dentistry. She later wrote, "People were amazed when they learned that a young girl had so far forgotten her womanhood as to want to study dentistry."

== Later life ==
Hobbs next moved to Chicago, where she met James M. Taylor, whom she married in April 1867. Taylor then convinced her husband to also enter dentistry. The two then moved to Lawrence, Kansas, where they had a large and successful practice. Hobbs was involved in several fraternal organizations including Daughters of Rebekah, the auxiliary to the Independent Order of Odd Fellows and Order of the Eastern Star, auxiliary to Freemasonry. After her husband's death in 1886, she ceased to be an active dentist, but became more active in politics, campaigning for greater women's rights, until her own death on October 3, 1910. In her time as a dentist, Lucy Hobbs Taylor opened up brand new doors to many women in the future, especially in the medical field. She believed that her journey was complete by "making it possible for women to be recognized in the dental profession on equal terms with men". Lucy Hobbs Taylor is buried at Oak Hill Cemetery in Lawrence, Kansas.

== Legacy ==
By 1900, almost one thousand women had followed Lucy Taylor into dentistry, an increase many attribute largely to her accomplishments. In 1983, the American Association of Women Dentists honored Taylor by establishing the Lucy Hobbs Taylor Award, which it now presents annually to AAWD members in recognition of professional excellence and achievements in advancing the role of women in dentistry.

== See also ==
- Amalia Assur
- Emma Gaudreau Casgrain
- Rosalie Fougelberg
- Lilian Lindsay
