= Artiplanto =

- Type: Private
- Industry: Home décor and artificial plants
- Founded: 2019; 7 years ago
- Headquarters: 1670 Rte 117; Val-David, Quebec; J0T 2N0 Canada
- Area served: Canada, United States, Europe
- Products: Artificial plants, home décor
- Website: www.artiplanto.com

Artiplanto is a Canadian home décor brand that specializes in artificial plants and related décor products.

The company was founded in 2019 as a premium artificial plants brand, since then the company has branched into other home decor lines including planters, rugs and coffee tables.

The company's products are designed in Montreal & New York City, and shipping includes Canada and the United States.

As of 2021, the brand further expanded to Europe with a distribution port launched in Germany, offering collections of some of the brand’s top-selling artificial plants and other home décor products.

The company has received attention from several national and international online and print publications including The Globe And Mail, the Edmonton Journal, and Women’s Health.

Also Artiplanto purchases are in collaboration with onetreeplanted.org which allows Artiplanto to plant one tree with each purchase.
