= M&S Schmalberg =

American fabric flower manufacturer

- Type: Private
- Industry: Fabric flower manufacturing
- Founded: 1916 in New York City, United States
- Founder: Morris and Sam Schmalberg
- Headquarters: New York City, United States
- Area served: Worldwide
- Website: customfabricflowers.com
- Footnotes; Located in the Garment District, Manhattan

M&S Schmalberg is a fabric flower manufacturer in New York City. The flowers are used to adorn clothing. The company has been in business for more than a century. They sell to various designers. The business competes with low-cost mass production factories in other countries. The company recreates various flowers.
