= Granqvist =

Granqvist and Grankvist are surnames of Swedish origin which may refer to:

== Granqvist ==
- Andreas Granqvist, Swedish football player
- Beat-Sofi Granqvist (1869 – 1960), Finnish actress and florist
- Carl Jan Granqvist, Swedish restaurateur
- Claes-Göran Granqvist, Swedish physicist
- Helene Granqvist (born 1970), Swedish curler
- Hilma Granqvist, Swedish-Finnish anthropologist
- Lasse Granqvist, Swedish sports commentator
- Pehr Granqvist, Swedish psychologist at Uppsala University

== Grankvist ==
- Therese Grankvist, Swedish singer and former member of Drömhus
