= Ohio College of Dental Surgery =

Former college in Cincinnati, Ohio (1845–1926)

The Ohio College of Dental Surgery opened in 1845 in Cincinnati, Ohio, United States, becoming the second private dental college in the world. In 1866 Lucy Hobbs Taylor graduated from this college, making her the first woman to graduate from any dental college. The college affiliated itself with the University of Cincinnati in 1887, but it was ultimately closed in 1926.

== Notable graduates ==
- Calvin Case, developed Velum Obturator
- Lucy Hobbs Taylor, first woman to graduate from any dental college
