= Emma Fürstenhoff =

Swedish artist (1802–1871)

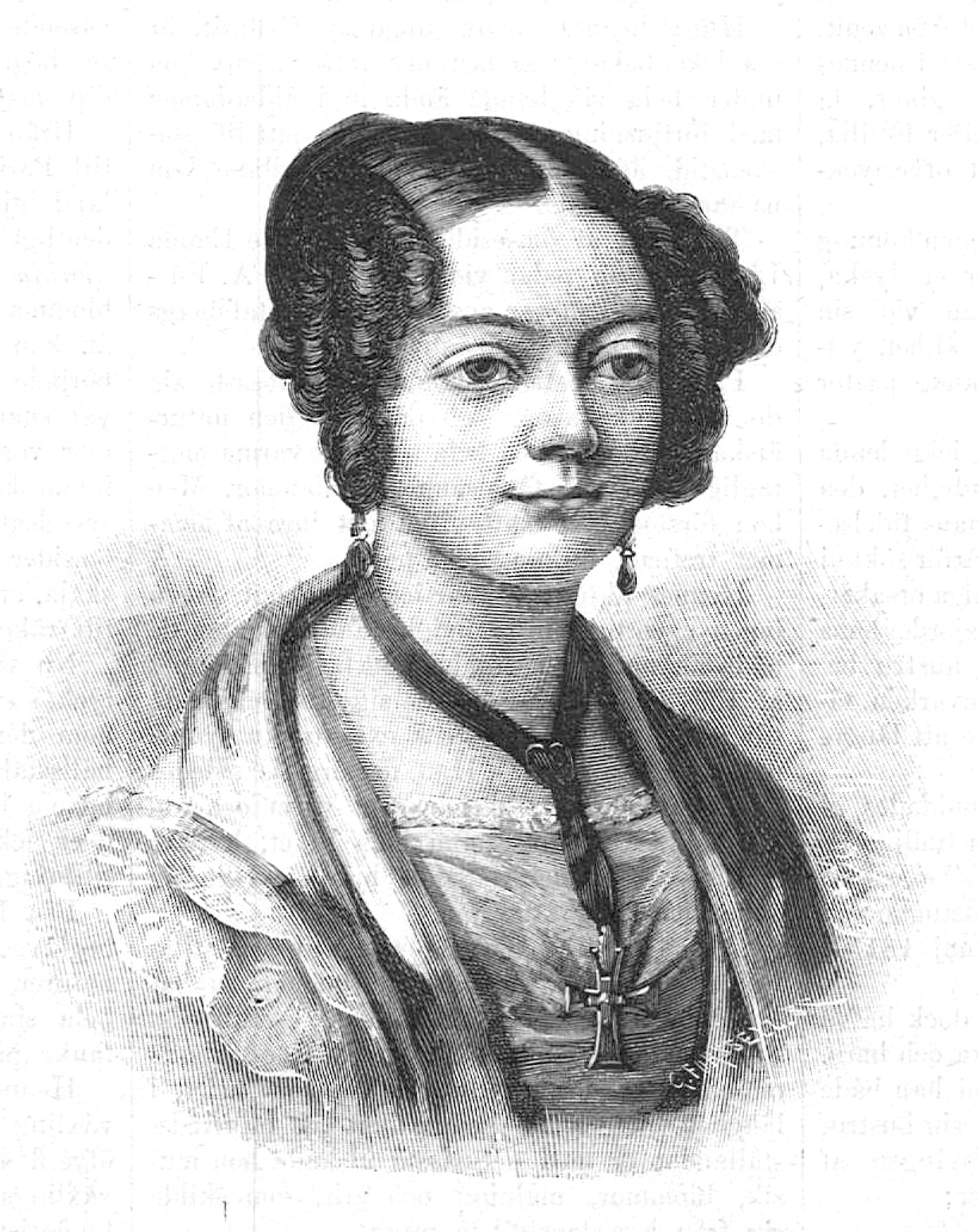
- Emma Fürstenhoff Idun1890, nr 32
- Born: Emilia "Emma" Lindegren; 1802; Stockholm, Sweden
- Died: 1871 (aged 68–69); Paris, France
- Known for: Wax flower arrangement
- Spouse: A. Fürstenhoff

Emilia "Emma" Fürstenhoff, née Lindegren (1802 – March 1871), was a Swedish artist (florist), internationally known for her manufacturing and arrangements of artificial flowers of wax, which were a novelty in contemporary Europe.

== Life ==
Emma Fürstenhoff was born in Stockholm, the daughter of the poet and royal secretary Carl Johan Lindegren (d. 1815) and the noble Sofia Silfverskiöld. Both she and her mother was the subject of her father's poems. Her father later became an alcoholic and was ruined, her parents divorced, and she moved to the capital with her mother. She displayed an early interest in flowers, and when she left her father's property with her mother, it is said that she asked her mother to bring all the flowers with them.

In Stockholm, she became the fosterchild of a mamsell Forslöf, lady in waiting to Princess Sophie Albertine of Sweden. She was described as brilliant and passionate. Around the age of twenty, she married for love to A. Fürstenhoff, a clerk at Gustafsberg's porcelain factory, with whom she had a son, Johan.

After her marriage, Emma Fürstenhoff manufactured ornaments for sale, and eventually learned to manufacture artificial flowers. She displayed her flowers at several successful art exhibitions in Stockholm. Her work was then displayed in art exhibitions in London, Saint Petersburg and finally in Paris. In Saint Petersburg, she stayed for two years and became an artistic celebrity in the cultural salons, where she was celebrated by diplomats and aristocrats. In an exhibition at the Jardin des Plantes in Paris, she was a great success, and her flowers were considered better than the real ones.

She separated from her husband and moved permanently to Paris, where she founded a studio for manufacturing artificial flowers. Most of her employees were female, among them the supervisor Thilda Österberg who was also from Sweden. Fürstenhoff was a successful artist, who made a fortune on her work. One of her customers was Harriet Howard. In 1864, she was referred to as an artist fashionable in Europe for decades.

During the Franco-Prussian War, she volunteered as a nurse and tendered to the wounded soldiers. By doing so, she fell sick herself, and died in Paris, during the establishment of the Paris Commune in March 1871.

== See also ==
- Emma Peachey
- Fredrika Ramstedt
