= Fredrika Ramstedt =

Swedish artist

Carolina Fredrika "Fredrique" Ramstedt (11 August 1829, Stockholm - 23 November 1914, Uppsala) was a Swedish artist and florist. She manufactured artificial flowers made of leather, paper and textile, as well as flowers of wax, which was a novelty of the time and very popular. She was described at one point as the most fashionable artisan of her trade in Stockholm.

== Life ==
Fredrika Ramstedt manfucatured flowers early on, and manufucatured artificial flowers by order for private customers, until she achieved fame at the age of twenty. In 1850 she participated in the exhibition of the Swedish Horticultural Society (Svenska trädgårdsföreningens utställning) in Stockholm with an articial Victoria regia of wax, made in three stages of its development: a bud, half broken bud, and fully developed flower. This flower had been manufactured by her on the order of a Director Bastman, who had shown it to Crown Princess Louise and then registered it to the exhibition, where it became a success and resulted in the professional breakthrough of the artisan.

She participated in the Exposition Universelle (1855) in Paris, where she was given an honorable mention, and in the 1862 International Exhibition in London, where she was awarded a medal.

She gave private lessons and manfucatured flowers for private clients. She manufactured flowers of a variety of different materials, but her work in wax was the most noted. To use wax to manufacture flowers was a new popular novelty, and Ramstedt was considered to master this new form of art.

In the 1864–1866 work of famous Swedish women by Wilhelmina Stålberg, she is described as:

"... by everyone recognized as the most skilled florist of the Swedish capital [...]. Mamsell Ramstedt do not limit herself to manufacture flowers of wax. She has with the same success manufactured them in leather, as long as this beautiful work, which in a curious way is reminiscent of sculpture, was the fashion. After this came flowers of paper, of which mamsell Ramstedt, as everyone knows, have excelled and of which one has seen the most beautiful examples, such as at exhibitions ... - flowers of textile are however those which, when the other come and disappear with fashion, last the longest and are surely never discarded, since they are used for decoration to so many things, not only for clothing but also in rooms. It is with the manufacture of those that the skillful fleurist actually work and support herself, and surely everyone will wish her continued happiness and success with her beautiful, though industrious and - not quite so profitable work, at the same time as we congratulate our nation for even in this aspect own something so asthonishing."

Fredrika Ramstedt married, on 14 March 1865, Johan Bernhard Wessberg (1820–1867), and on 9 May 1868 to Klas Jakob Söderman (1834–1908).

== See also ==
- Emma Peachey
- Emma Fürstenhoff
