= Rosalie Fougelberg =

- Occupation: Dentist

Rosalie Ingeborg Karolina Fougelberg (29 December 1841 – 8 May 1911) is known as Sweden's first female dentist after the profession was opened to women.

She was the daughter of the dentist of the Royal Court of Sweden, and her father's assistant. In 1861, the dentist profession was legally opened to women. Fougelberg tried twice to get her dentist's certificate; the second time, she was approved by the medical examiners but not by the dentistry representative. During her third try in 1866, the examination was supervised by the press. She was still turned down by the Collegium Medicum, but given a royal dispensation by the monarch, Charles XV of Sweden. She was thereby the first woman dentist since the profession was opened for women: Amalia Assur had been licensed before, but she was given a special permission, before the profession was officially opened to women. Fougelberg was the personal dentist of the Queen, Louise of the Netherlands, from 1867 to 1871, and was later active in Stockholm (1867–79) and Västergötland (1883–1893). She married the sea captain and missionary Torell and emigrated to Alexandria in Egypt.

== See also ==
- Amalia Assur, first female dentist in Sweden
- Lucy Hobbs Taylor
