= Amalia Assur =

Swedish dentist

Amalia Assur (June 8, 1803 – 1889) was the first female dentist in Sweden.

Amalia Assur was born in Stockholm as the daughter of the Jewish dentist Joel Assur (1753–1837), the Dentist of the Royal Family, who has been referred to as one of the first educated dentists in Sweden, and Esther Moses Heilbuth. Her brother James Assur also became a dentist. Amalia Assur never married, and remained a mamsell. She was educated in dentistry by her father and active as his assistant early on.

As an assistant dentist, her position was an informal one, and Assur was eventually reported to the authorities for practicing without a license. In 1852, she was given special dispensation from the Royal Board of Health (Kongl. Sundhetskollegiet) to practice independently as a dentist. The permission was a personal dispensation, because the profession of dentistry was formally barred for women, and she was therefore a special exception rather than a pioneer for other women, as the profession was still prohibited for women. She was active in Stockholm.

In 1861, the profession of dentistry was formally opened to women. The first woman to have been given permission to practice after the profession of dentistry was open to women was Rosalie Fougelberg.

== See also ==
- Lovisa Åhrberg
