= Joel Assur =

Swedish dentist (1753–1837)

- Occupation: Dentist

Joel Assur (1753–1837) was a Swedish dentist. He has been referred to as the "first dentist" in Sweden, in the modern sense of the word.

== Life and education ==
Assur was born in Bernburg in Germany to the Jewish merchant Anschel Levin Joel Assur and Zipora Joel. He emigrated from Mecklenburg to Sweden in 1791, and was established as a dentist in Stockholm. He had a successful career, was appointed the official dentist of the Royal Family, and has been referred to as the first dentist in Sweden in the modern sense of the word. He published the first Swedish work in dentistry, "Korrt underrättelse om de mäst vanliga Tand-Sjukdomar" ("Short Note of the most common illnesses of teeth", 1799). He was the father of Amalia Assur.
