= Emma Peachey =

British artist

Emma Peachey (Note: Known during her lifetime as Mrs. Peachey) (died 1875) was a British artist, writer and instructor who made wax models of flowers and fruit, and is sometimes considered to have re-popularised wax flowers in Victorian Britain. She benefited from royal patronage, becoming "Artiste in Wax Flowers" to Queen Victoria in 1839 and making ten thousand white wax roses for the royal wedding. A review in The Times describes her work as "perfect of its kind". Her books include the manual The Royal Guide to Wax Flower Modelling (1851), which the historian Ann B. Shteir characterises as trying to "bridge a growing divide between art and science".

== Biography ==
Peachey (her married name) was not a botanist by formal training, and started modelling flowers in wax as a hobby. Little is known of her background but she states that her father was a British army surgeon and officer. Her opportunity arose in 1837, shortly after Queen Victoria's ascension to the throne, when she created a wax bouquet for Buckingham Palace, which found favour with the Queen. Peachey recorded that her circumstances some time afterwards changed, forcing her to attempt to make her living in London from wax modelling; in 1839 she was appointed by Royal Letters Patent as "Artiste in Wax Flowers to Her Majesty". In 1840, she made ten thousand white wax roses for the marriage of Victoria and Albert, which were distributed as bridal favours, and also replicated the royal wedding bouquets. Her business flourished as a result.

Peachey is credited by Beatrice Howe as having re-stimulated public interest in wax flowers in Victorian Britain, the art having been introduced to British aristocratic circles in the late 17th century. Peachey was unusual in positioning herself as a career woman in what was perceived as a domestic sphere. The historian Ann B. Shteir describes her as "clearly entrepreneurial"; she displayed her models at her studio or showroom in London, which was open during the day to the public for free, and advertised that she supplied them as models for floral artists and for lectures in botany. Like others engaged in making wax models at the time, she offered materials for sale, including custom nontoxic colours made with the aid of a German chemist. She taught women students the craft privately; her pupils included Queen Victoria's eldest daughter, the Princess Royal, whom she taught at Kensington Palace.

Peachey published articles on the craft under a pseudonym in the Lady's Newspaper and Pictorial Times in 1847. In 1848, she exhibited successfully at the Society of Arts. Several major pieces, including two unusually large models, were scheduled to be exhibited at the Great Exhibition of 1851; these included a nearly 6-ft-high grouping incorporating both native and exotic flowers, and an arrangement of fruit measuring around 4 feet by 3 feet whose glass cover, Peachey stated, was the "largest ever yet blown in England". However, disagreement over the suitability of the location allocated led her instead to show them at her own premises at 35 Rathbone Place, where she stated that 50,000 people came to view them. Her decision to withdraw from the Great Exhibition was widely reported in contemporary newspapers. Her private display was reviewed in The Times, which praises her work as "perfect of its kind". These large works are not documented as having survived. Other notable works include an 1850 model of the Victoria regia water lily, which drew approbation from the royal family.

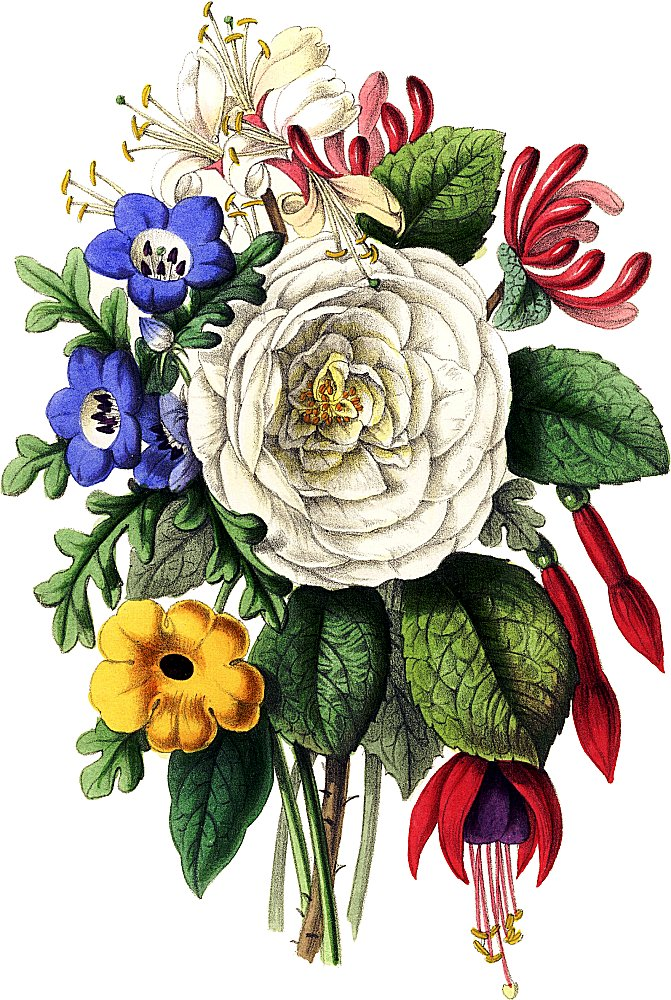
Lithograph from The Royal Guide

=== The Royal Guide and later life ===
In 1851, Peachey self-published the manual The Royal Guide to Wax Flower Modelling, which instructs on how to model in wax to create accurate depictions of a range of flowers. Queen Victoria permitted the book to be dedicated to the Princess Royal. Aimed at women, it promotes the craft as a feminine art particularly suitable for young women, emphasising its health benefits compared with competing pastimes such as embroidery. Peachey supplies basic instructions for blending colours and using tools such as curling pins. She suggests observing flowers in botanic gardens such as Kew and Regent's Park. Although not intended as a botanical text, and less focused on science than the 1852 work by Rebekah Skill, The Royal Guide explains some botanical information. It equally draws on the language of flowers to instruct readers on the meanings of flowers, and also includes short poems. Its four colour lithographs depict arrangements themed by season, with the flowers being juxtaposed purely for aesthetic effect.

A contemporary review in The Morning Chronicle describes the instructions as "lucid and straightforward", and both the Chronicle and The Morning Post praise the colour plates and the interspersed poetry about flowers. Shteir characterises the book as an example of an attempt to "bridge a growing divide between art and science by calling on the languages and techniques of each", considering that, in its text, "flowers carry layers of meaning" encompassing "botany, art, and moral signification". The art historian Lucia Tongiorgi Tomasi describes The Royal Guide as a "fascinating example of Victoriana".

The popularity of wax flowers began to wane after the 1850s. Peachey's showrooms remained open in London in the early 1870s; she had by then moved to nearby Berners Street, and was advertising for pupils in paper-flower manufacture as well as wax modelling. Peachey died in around December 1875, with her estate being valued at below £300.

== Selected publications ==
- Mrs. Peachey. The Royal Guide to Wax Flower Modelling (W. N. Horton; 1851), with lithographs by J. Gardner & Co., Hatton Garden, London
- Mrs. Peachey. The Little Flower Maker (A. N. Myers & Co; 1869)

== See also ==
- E. S. Mogridge, a member of the Mintorn family, who made botanical models in wax particularly for museum displays
- Emma Fürstenhoff
- Fredrika Ramstedt
