= E. S. Mogridge =

British wax modeller

Elizabeth Sarah Mogridge (Note: Sometimes given as Moggridge; after her marriage, she was primarily referred to as Mrs. Mogridge or Mrs. E. S. Mogridge, and occasionally as Mrs. Charles Mogridge.) (née Mintorn; died 5 April 1903) was a British modeller in wax who became known for her natural history models for museums, particularly the British Museum in London and the American Museum of Natural History in New York. The bird exhibits at the American Museum of Natural History, for which she created backgrounds replicating the habitat (in collaboration with Jenness Richardson and her brother Horatio Mintorn) were the earliest exhibits in the United States to display birds in a simulated natural habitat; a Scientific American article praises her "very perfect reproduction of natural environment in every detail".

== Early life ==
Elizabeth Sarah Mintorn was born around the early 1830s, the eldest daughter of John Mintorn, a miniature painter. Her mother (died c. 1839) was from a well-established family who lived at Wych Court in Gloucestershire. Elizabeth had two brothers and one sister. It is unknown whether she received any scientific education. (Note: A 1990 compilation of women active in the area of plants in North America before the 20th century does not list any degree.) On 13 September 1853, she married Charles Mogridge of New Bond Street.

== Early career and British museums ==
The Mintorn family was known from the 1830s for their wax sculptures of flowers. Her brothers John H. and Horatio Mintorn, the authors of Hand-Book for Modelling Wax Flowers (1844), ran a business in London which sold supplies and kits. Elizabeth and her younger sister Rebecca modelled in wax as part of the family firm, jointly winning the medal for wax flower models at the Great Exhibition of 1851. They worked from premises in Soho Square, expanding in 1853 to a showroom on New Bond Street. The family published numerous instructional texts and later also moved into other forms of flower manufacture, particularly using paper. Mogridge wrote The Handbook or Guide to Modelling in Leather (c. 1876). (Note: Advertised in the 4th edition of J. H. Mintorn's Lessons in Flower and Fruit Modelling in Wax) The first generation of the family had developed a customised wax, and the younger generation invented "Mintorn art fabric", a durable wax product adapted for making museum models, whose constituents were long kept private. This was based on "silk lisse" coated with wax and chemicals, and could be coloured using oil paints.

In 1879, Mogridge (together with various family members (Note: The work at the British Museum also involved her brothers John and Horatio Mintorn, with later contributions from her niece Edith Emett.)) started to create wax models for the British Museum's natural history department, at the suggestion of either Richard Bowdler Sharpe or Albert Günther. She worked particularly on the settings of displays of birds, making more than a hundred exhibits. In 1880, with Horatio Mintorn, she modelled caterpillars on plants for the entomologist Thomas de Grey, Lord Walsingham, and later created educational plant models at larger than life size for the botanist William Carruthers at the British Museum. Mogridge sold a number of botanical models to Leicester Museum in 1894.

She passed on her skills to her sister's daughter, Edith Delta Emett (who married Vernon H. Blackman in 1901); the latter made flower and insect models for Kew Gardens, the Natural History Museum and other museums from the 1890s.

== American museums and later life ==
In the mid-1880s, Mogridge went to the United States, accompanied by her brother Horatio Mintorn; she spent much of the rest of her life in the country. Mogridge was invited by Morris Ketchum Jesup, president of the American Museum of Natural History of New York City, who admired her work at the British Museum and wished to develop similar exhibits at the New York museum. Mogridge and Mintorn initially spent three years there, creating insects and plants for dioramas illustrating birds and mammals. The museum's taxidermist Jenness Richardson designed the groups and sourced the materials; the work was funded by Mary Stuart, widow of the museum's second president, Robert L. Stuart. Twelve bird cases (eighteen grouped specimens) had been completed by 1887, and were the first exhibits in the United States to display birds in a simulated natural habitat. To create these exhibits Richardson collected the nest together with its associated vegetation, which was sectioned into numbered pieces; for ground-nesting birds, a piece of turf a square yard in area surrounding the nest was cut out. The nest and vegetation were packed and transported to the museum, where the background material was reproduced in full detail. Mogridge took the lead in this work, with Mintorn described as her assistant. Mogridge and Mintorn also worked on the Jesup collection at the American Museum of Natural History until 1892, making models to show the destructive effects of insects on timber.

In 1892–93, Mogridge and Mintorn went to Washington where they made botanical models for the US government, including illustrations of insect spoilage of food crops. These models appeared at the Chicago World's Fair of 1893 and were then displayed at the Smithsonian Institution. In the mid-1890s they made a series of exhibits of local birds for the Field Museum of Natural History in Chicago. Mogridge returned to the American Museum of Natural History in the 1890s, funded by a legacy from Mrs Stuart; she worked on forty bird exhibits, as well as prairie grasses and flowers for a large exhibit of buffalo (with her brother). In 1896 she was working on bird exhibits for the George Walter Vincent Smith Art Museum at Springfield, Massachusetts. Her models were also displayed at the Carnegie Museum, Pittsburgh, and the Brooklyn Institute. She gave classes in New York and other cities to expound their methods.

Mogridge died on 5 April 1903 at Springfield, Massachusetts, United States.

== Reception ==
Mogridge is described as "without a rival" in making flower models for museums in an 1887 article in the British journal Nature. Her work with Horatio Mintorn for American museums received considerable publicity in the press in the United States. Several descriptions of the American Museum of Natural History exhibits that they worked on praise the detail of the backgrounds. One contemporary review in the Bulletin of the Torrey Botanical Club describes the settings as of interest to the botanist, because they are reproduced sufficiently accurately as to show the individual plant species present. An 1898 article in Science draws attention to the "microscopic care and verisimilitude" of the habitats of the bird and animal groups, which it attributes primarily to Mogridge and Jenness Richardson, and a 1906 article in Scientific American praises Mogridge's "very perfect reproduction of natural environment in every detail". An obituary in the American journal The Auk describes her as "exceedingly conscientious" and a "woman of rare skill" in her specialism.

== See also ==
- Emma Peachey, a London-based Victorian woman who made wax flower models
