= Beat-Sofi Granqvist =

Finnish actress and florist (1869–1960)

A picture of Beat-Sofi Granqvist from the 1910s.

Another picture of Beat-Sofi Granqvist from the 1910s.

Beat-Sofi Granqvist (1869 – 1960) was a Finnish actress and florist.

Beat-Sofi Granqvist's parents were Karl Emil Granqvist (1830–1889), a mathematics and natural history teacher at Pori upper elementary school, and his first wife, Maria Sofia Nyström. Beat-Sofi Granqvist was a student of Kaarlo Bergbom. She acted in the Swedish Theatre in Helsinki. She also went on tour in Sweden.

In the 1910s, Granqvist studied the manufacture of artificial flowers in Germany. After returning to Finland, she founded Finland's first artificial flower factory, next to her apartment at Pieni Roobertinkatu 4-6.
