= Artificial plants =

Imitations of natural plants

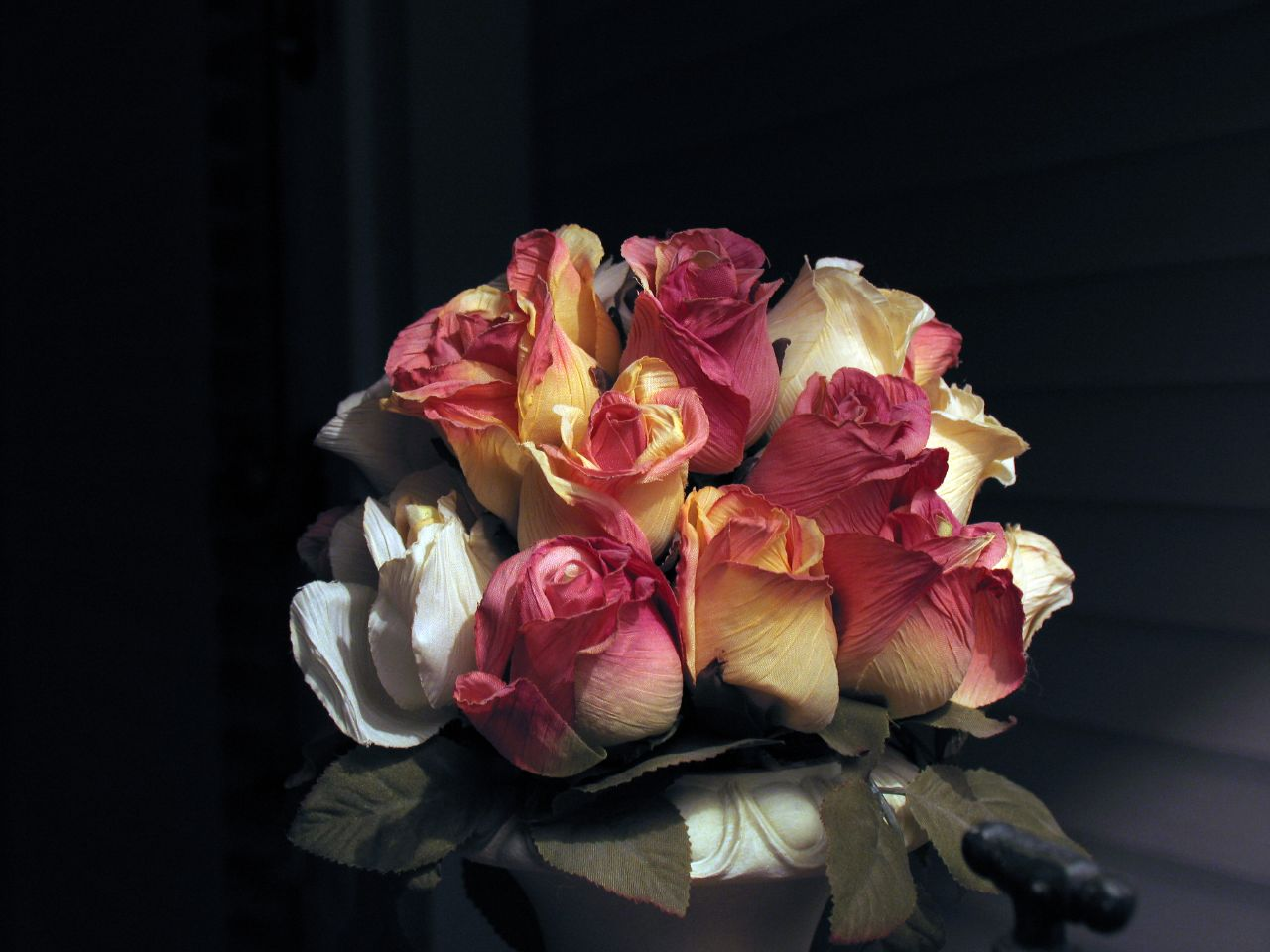
Artificial flowers made from plastic

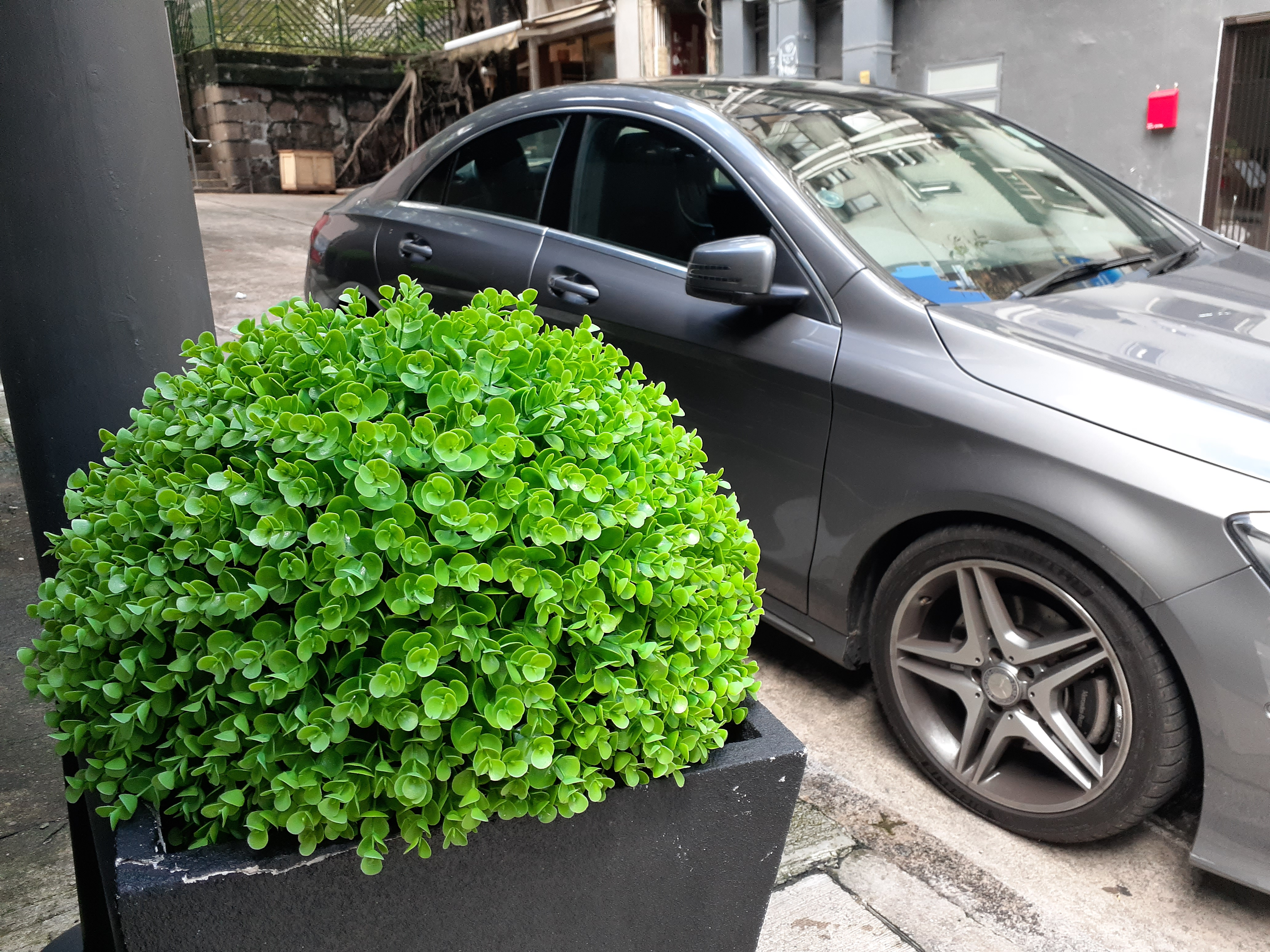
A plastic bush

Artificial plants, sometimes described as faux plants, are imitations of natural plants used for commercial or residential decoration. They are sometimes made for scientific purposes (the collection of glass flowers at Harvard University, for example, illustrates the flora of the United States). Artificial plants vary widely from mass-produced varieties that are distinguishable from real plants by casual observation to highly detailed botanical or artistic specimens.

Materials used in their manufacture have included painted linen and shavings of stained horn in ancient Egypt, gold and silver in ancient Rome, pith paper in China, silkworm cocoons in Italy, colored feathers in South America, and wax and tinted shells. Modern techniques involve carved or formed soap, nylon netting stretched over wire frames, ground clay, and mass-produced injection plastic mouldings. Polyester has been the main material for manufacturing artificial flowers since the 1970s. Most artificial flowers in the market nowadays are made of polyester fabric and plastic.

== Production ==
The industry is now highly specialized with several different manufacturing processes. Hundreds of artificial flower factories in the Pearl River delta area of Guangdong province in China have been built since the early 1980s. Thousands of 40-foot containers of polyester flowers and plants are exported to many countries every year.

=== Polyester and paper ===
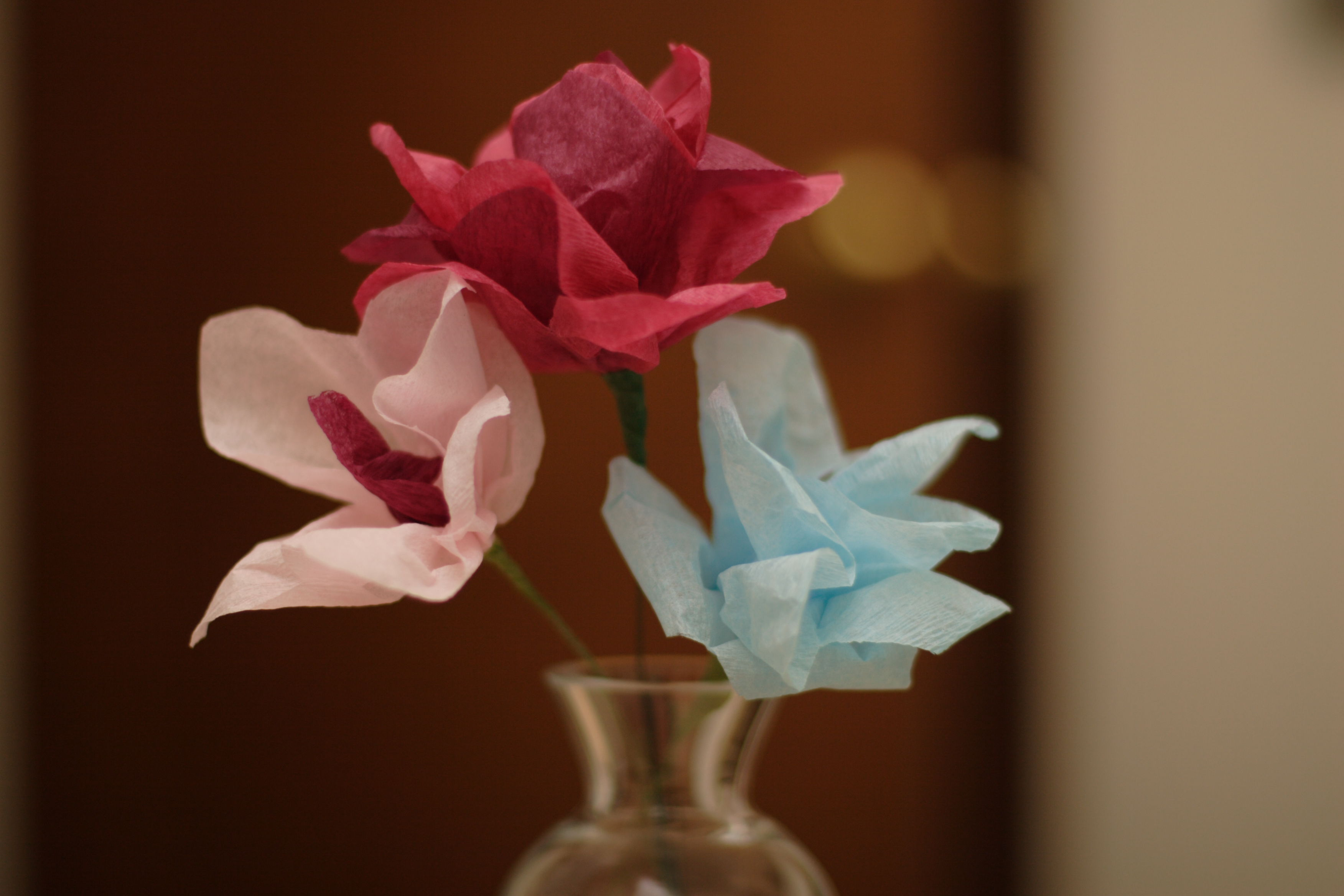
Paper flowers

Five main processes may be distinguished:

- The first step consists of putting the polyester fabric in gelatine in order to stiffen it.
- The second consists of cutting up the various polyester fabrics and materials employed into shapes suitable for forming the leaves, petals, etc.; this may be done with scissors, but is more often done with stamps that can cut through a dozen or more thicknesses at one blow.
- Next, the veins of the leaves are impressed by means of silk screen printing with a dye, and the petals are given their natural rounded forms by goffering irons of various shapes.
- The next step is to assemble the petals and other parts of the flower, which is built up from the center outwards.
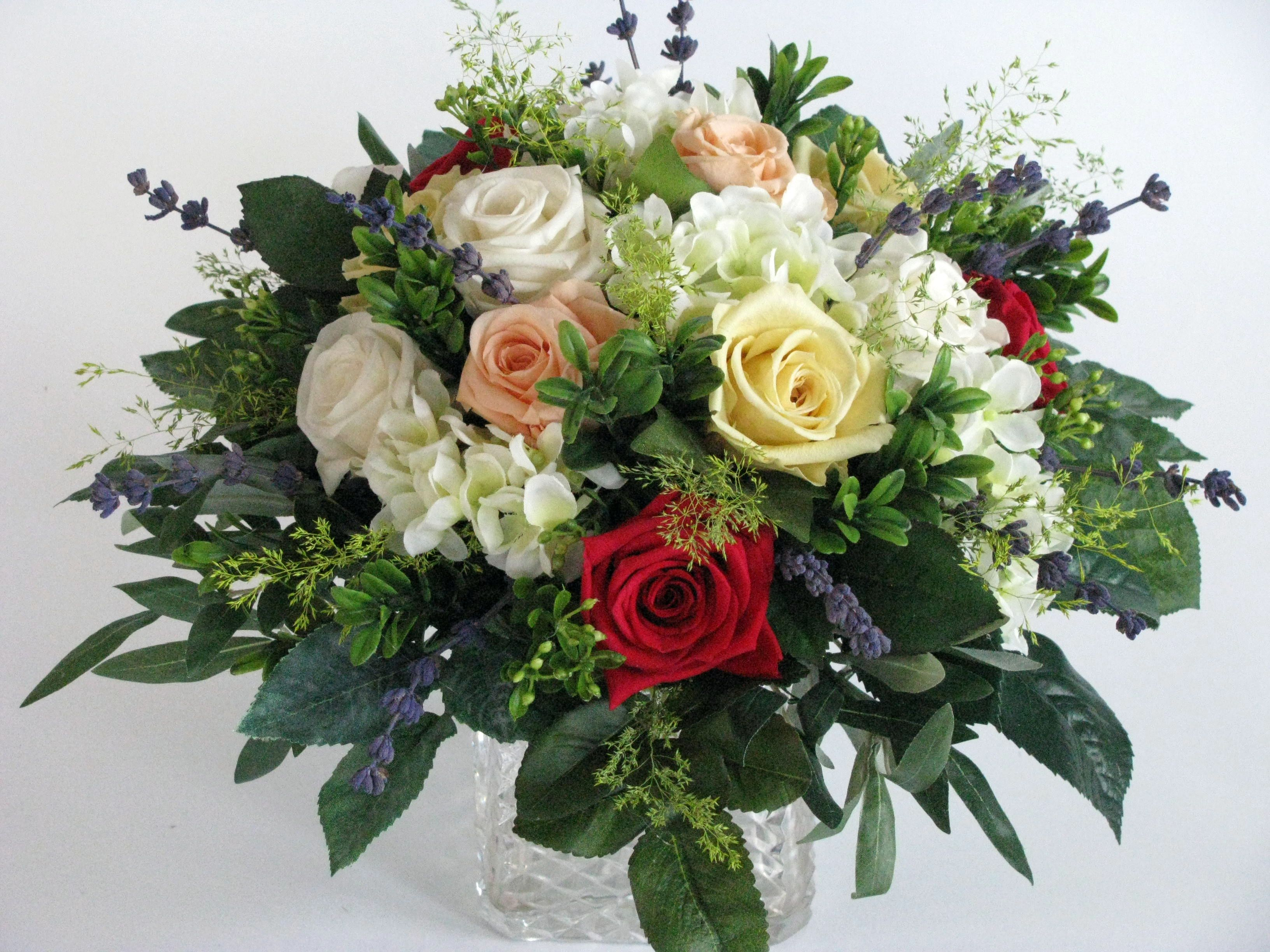
  Flower bouquet with prepared rose blossoms and silk flowers
- The fifth is to mount the flower on a stalk of brass or iron wire wrapped with suitably colored material, and to add the leaves to complete the spray.

While the material most often used to make artificial flowers is polyester fabric, both paper and cloth flowers are also made with origami.

=== Nylon stocking flowers ===
The art of nylon flower making is an easy to learn craft which uses simple tools and inexpensive material to achieve the desired results. Nylon flower making enjoyed a brief popularity in the United States in the 1970s and soon became very popular in Japan. In recent years, the craft's popularity has spread Asia, Europe and Australia. With the advent of new colors and materials, the art has expanded to infinite new possibilities of nylon flower making.

The basic materials needed to make nylon flowers include: wire, stem wire, nylon stocking, nylon threading, floral tape and stamen. Some flowers require cotton balls or sheets (or batting), white glue, acrylic paint and paint brushes.

=== Silk flowers ===
Silk flowers are crafted from a protein fibre spun by the silk worm, producing lifelike flowers. Flowers described as being made of silk with a "real touch technique" are not made of silk, but rather are made of polyester, polymers and plastics. Moreover, textile items made of polyester but marketed as "silk" violate the US federal law – specifically the 1959 Textile Fiber Products Identification Act.

=== Soap ===
There are two methods:

- Carved: A bar with layered coloured soap is mounted in a lathe, and circular grooves are chiseled into it. The finished flower is symmetric and regular, but the flowers are not identical and can be called handmade.
- Moulded: An oil-less soap milled to a powder is mixed with water, and the paste is used as a modelling material. Leaf and petal textures are stamped or rolled onto the soap. This is an expensive, labour-intensive process.

=== Clay ===
Clay flowers are made by hand from special air-dry polymer clay or cold porcelain, steel wire, paint, glue, tape and sometimes paper and foam as a filler.

With the help of cutters, where each flower has its own cutter set, the parts are cut from the still soft clay and then formed with specially designed tools. After drying, these parts are, when needed, painted with precision and then very precisely assembled into a whole flower. When made by a skilled artisan, clay flowers can be realistic. From Thailand, where this art is popular, it has spread to Europe, Russia and the US.

=== Glass ===
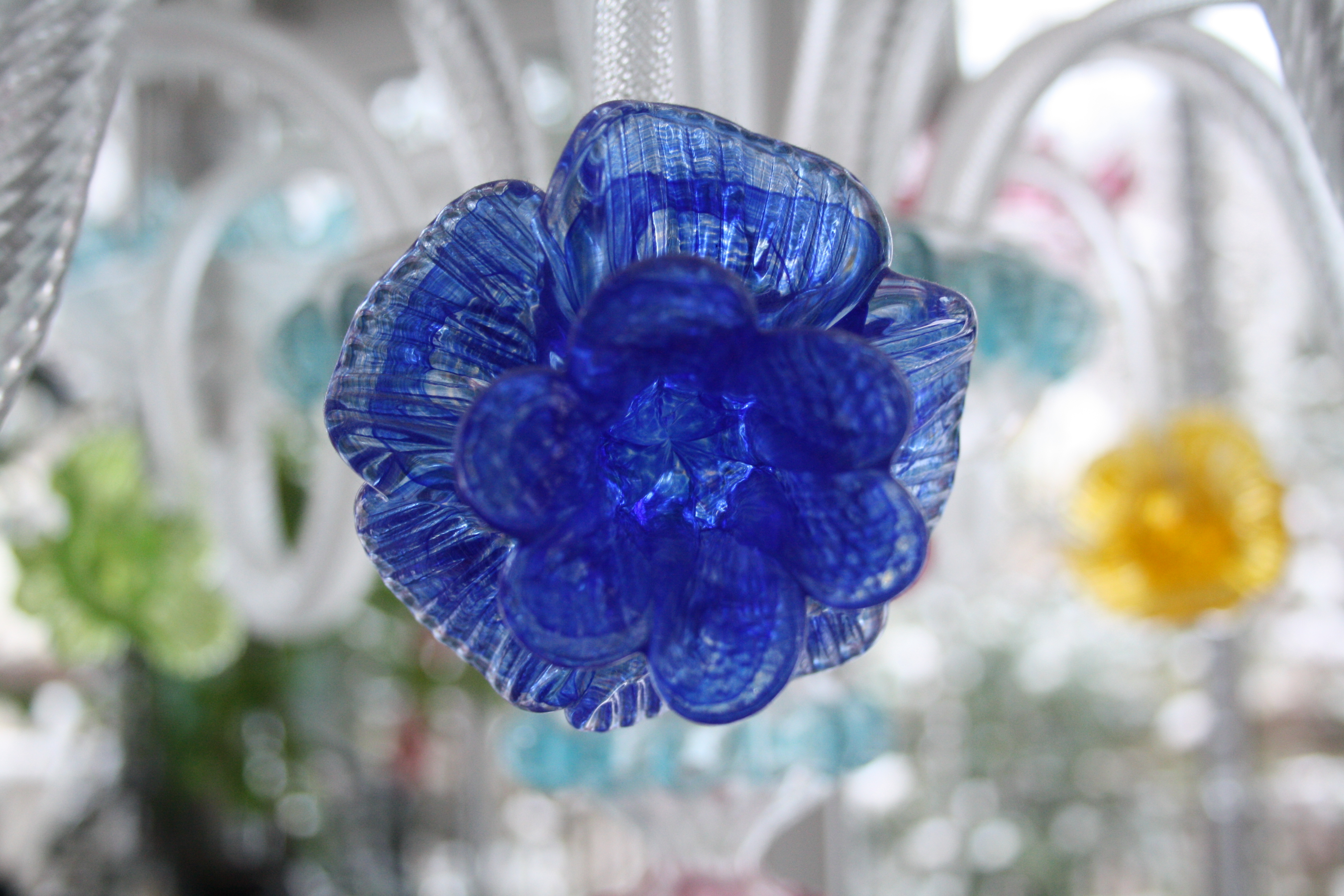
Flower in Murano glass

Glass is melted and blown by hand into flower shapes. Working with glass at high temperatures to form a flower is very difficult, which is why glass flowers are much more expensive than typical artificial flowers.

=== Plastic ===
Injection moulding is used for mass manufacture of plastic flowers. Plastic is injected into a preformed metal die.

== Simulacraceae ==
The journal Ethnobotany Research and Applications published a tongue-in-cheek paper that claims to be the culmination of a six-year project in the exhaustive taxonomy of artificial plants, and lumped the group into a single family called the Simulacraceae ("the family of simulated plants").

== Magic water flowers ==
Magic water flowers are structures that, when put in water, immediately open themselves and assume the form of flowers or other forms, such as snakes, fishes, fruit, animals, or houses or people. They were sold in 1957 by Sears and are advertised in House & Garden of 1968.

Nowadays, they are made from synthetic fibers. In the past, they were made by compressing the stems of the Japanese laurel tree, the cores of the elm tree, and wood chips. Corn stalks have also been used. They are thought to have been introduced to Japan from China during the Edo period. During the Enpo era, it became popular to float them in sake cups as a pastime at drinking parties.

== History ==
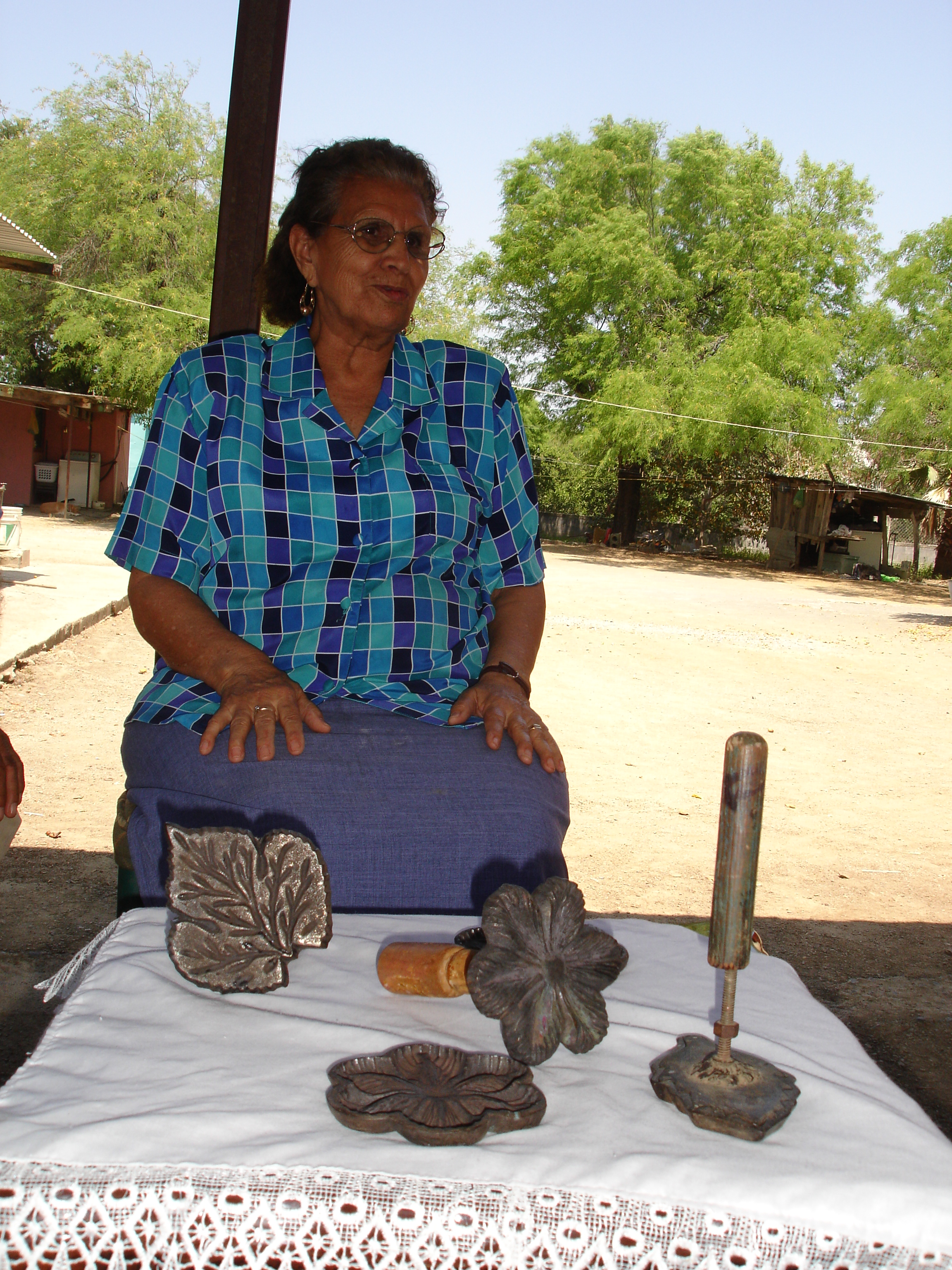
Mexican paper flower craftswoman

Floral wreaths made by the ancient Egyptians were formed from thin plates of horn stained in different colors. They also sometimes consisted of leaves of copper, gilt or were silvered over. The ancient Romans excelled in the art of imitating flowers in wax and in this branch of the art attained a degree of perfection which has not been approached in modern times. Crassus, renowned for his wealth, gave to the victors in the games he celebrated at Rome crowns of artificial leaves made of gold and silver.

In more recent times, Italians were the first to acquire celebrity for the skill and taste they displayed in this manufacture. Later English, American, and especially French manufactures were celebrated. The Chinese and Japanese show great dexterity in this work. These early artificial flowers were made out of many-coloured ribbons which were twisted together and attached to small pieces of wire. But these first attempts were decidedly crude.

In the first half of the 19th century, the Swedish artist Emma Fürstenhoff became internationally renowned in Europe for her artificial flower arrangements of wax in a technique regarded as a novelty in contemporary Europe. Wax flower sculptures were popular in the 1840s and 1850s in Britain, with noted sculptors including the London-based Emma Peachey and the Mintorn family.

In the 1910s, Beat-Sofi Granqvist studied the manufacture of artificial flowers in Germany. After returning to Finland, she founded Finland's first artificial flower factory, next to her apartment at Pieni Roobertinkatu 4-6.

In the course of time feathers were substituted for ribbons, a more delicate material, but one to which it was not so easy to give the requisite shades of color. The plumage of the birds of South America was adapted for artificial flowers on account of the brilliancy and permanence of the tints, and the natives of that continent long practised with success the making of feather flowers. The London Zoo contains a collection of artificial flowers made out of the feathers of hummingbirds.

== Gallery ==
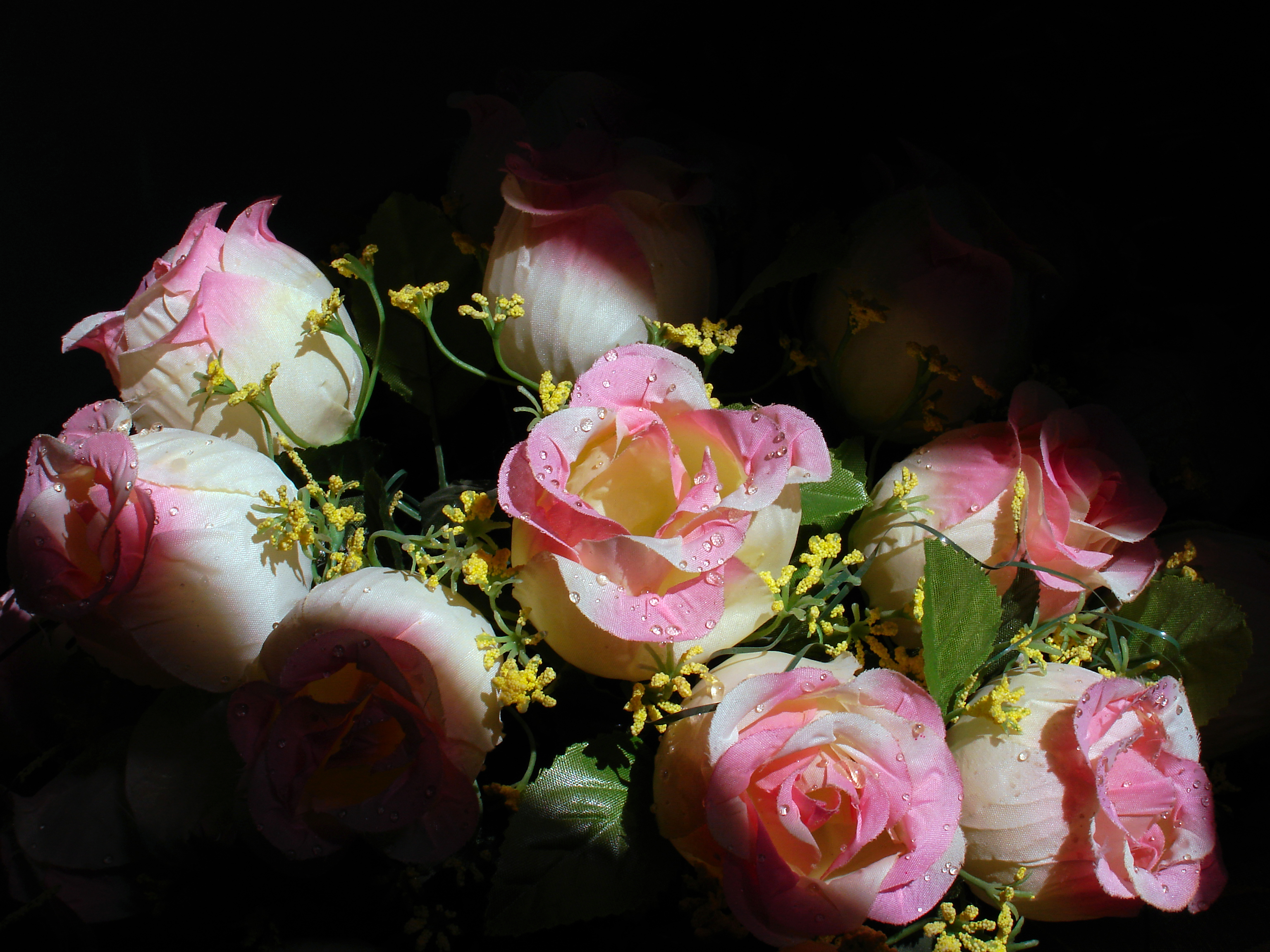
Artificial roses

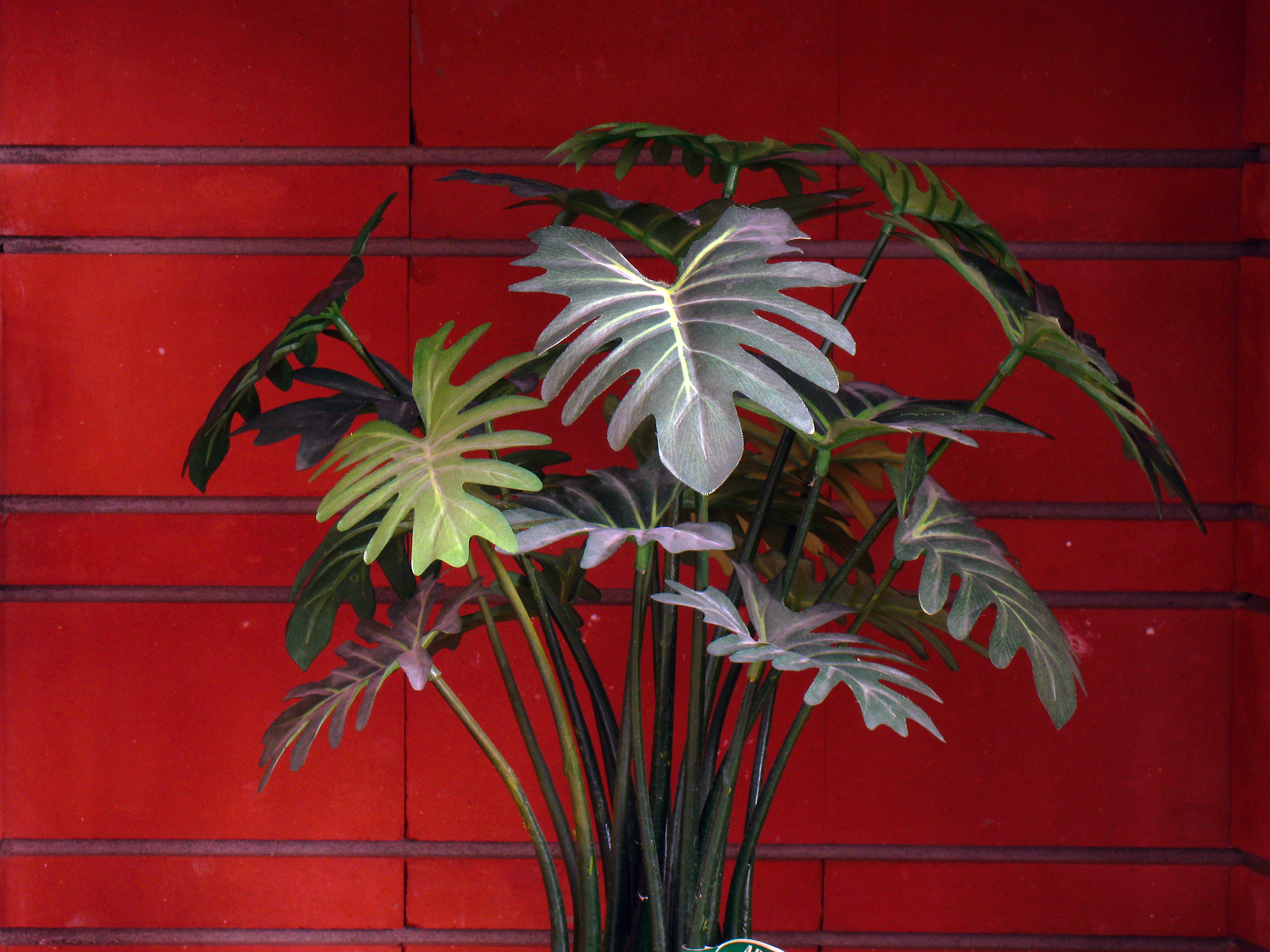
Artificial leaf display

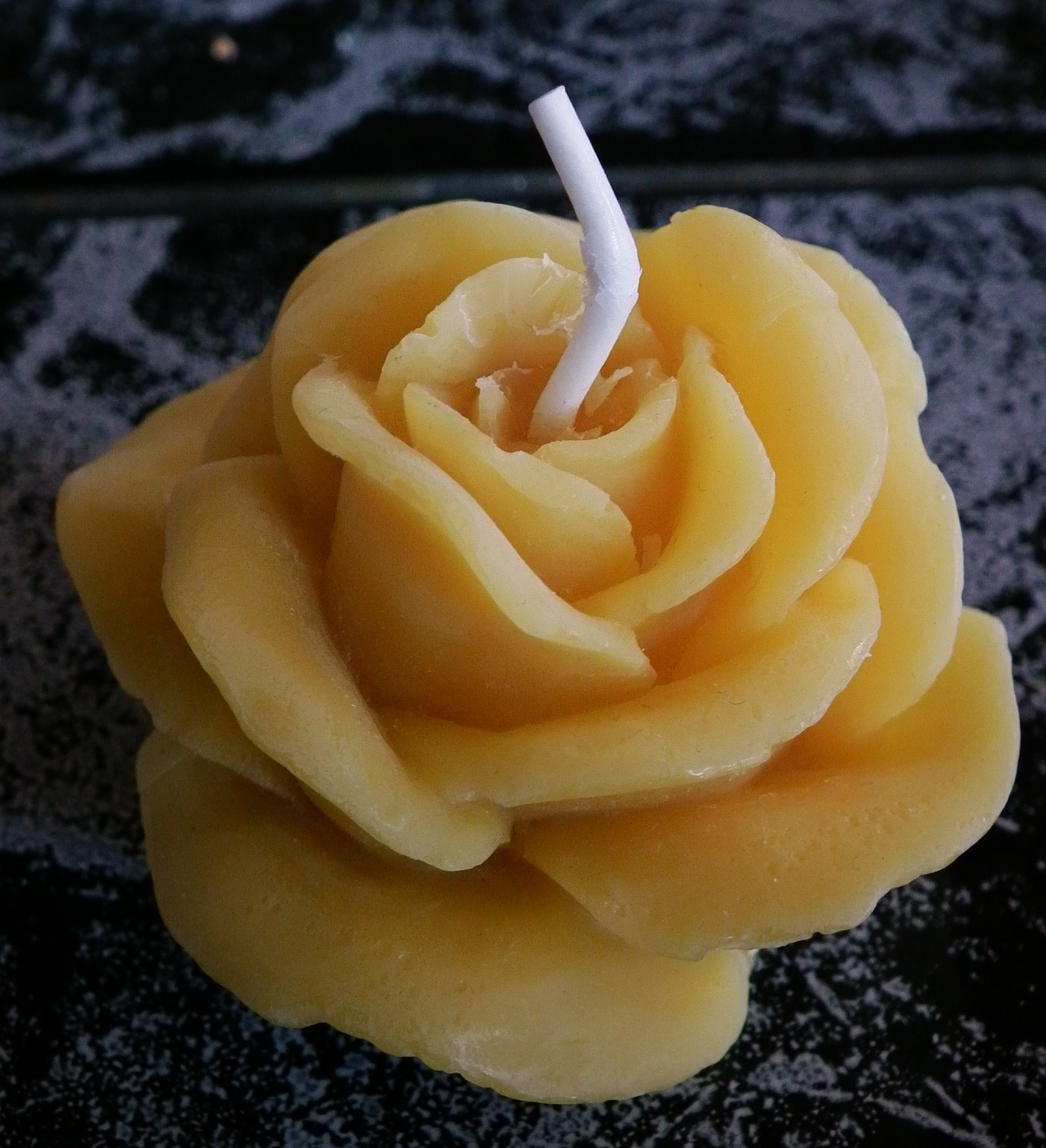
Rose-shaped candle

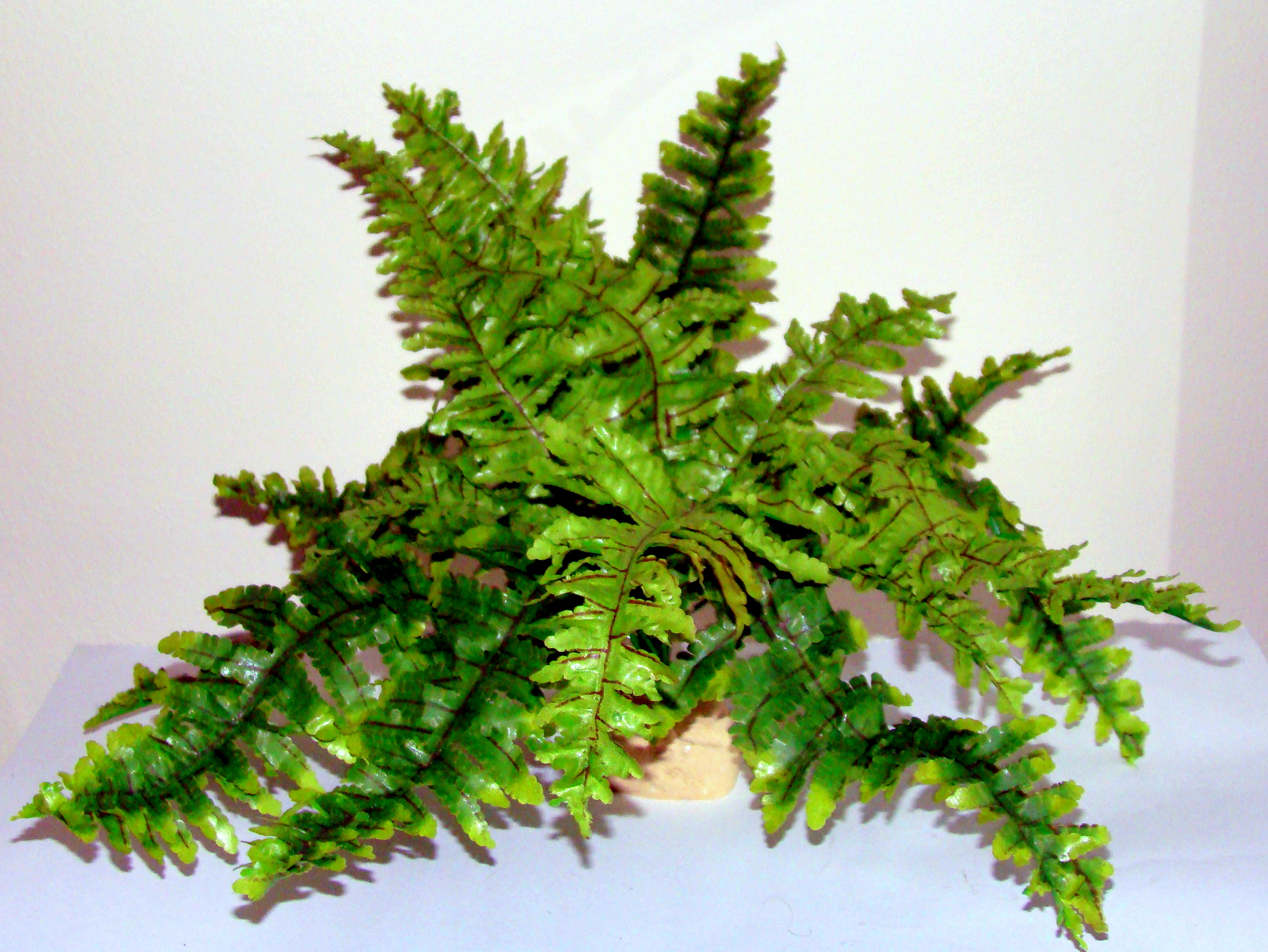
Artificial fern

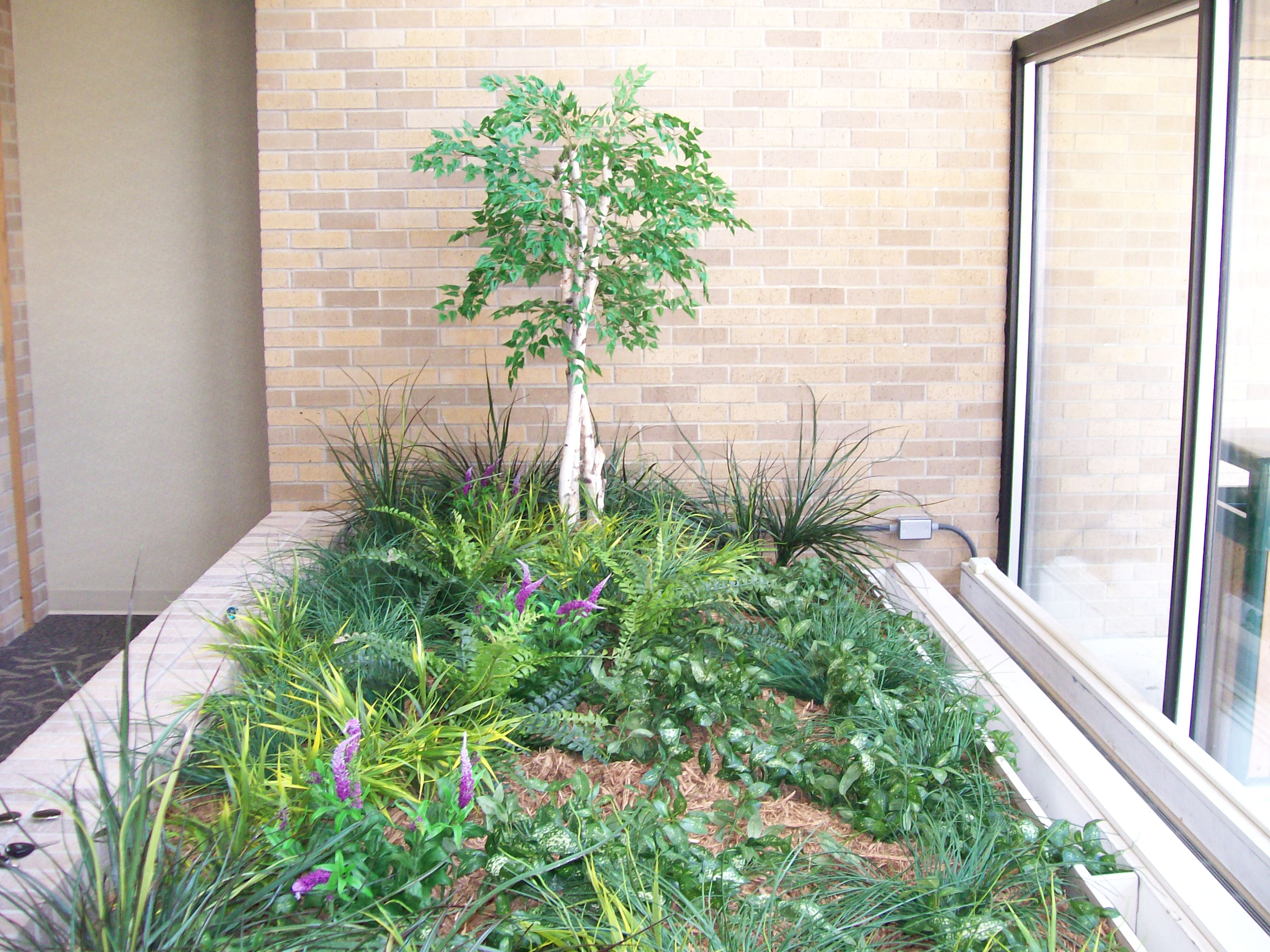
Fake tree and ground plants in an indoor display

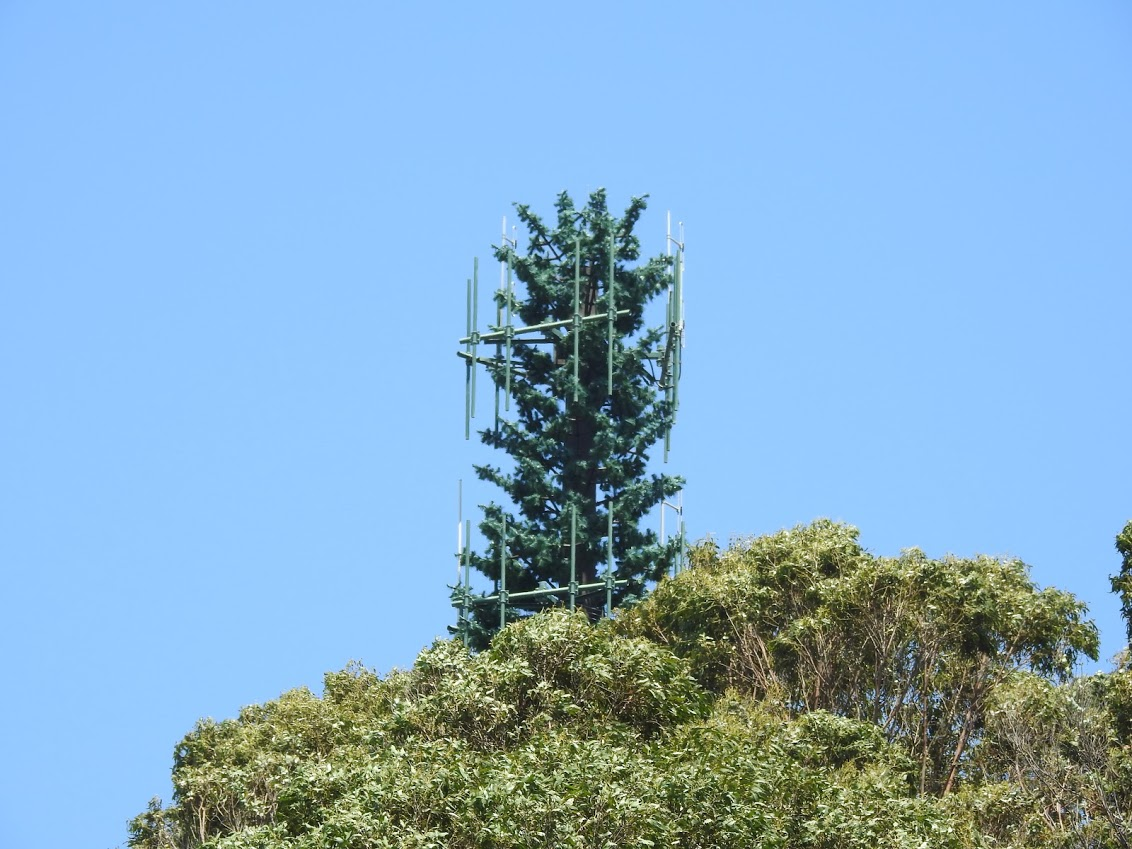
A cellphone tower disguised as a tree

== See also ==
- Artificial Christmas tree
