= Mamsell =

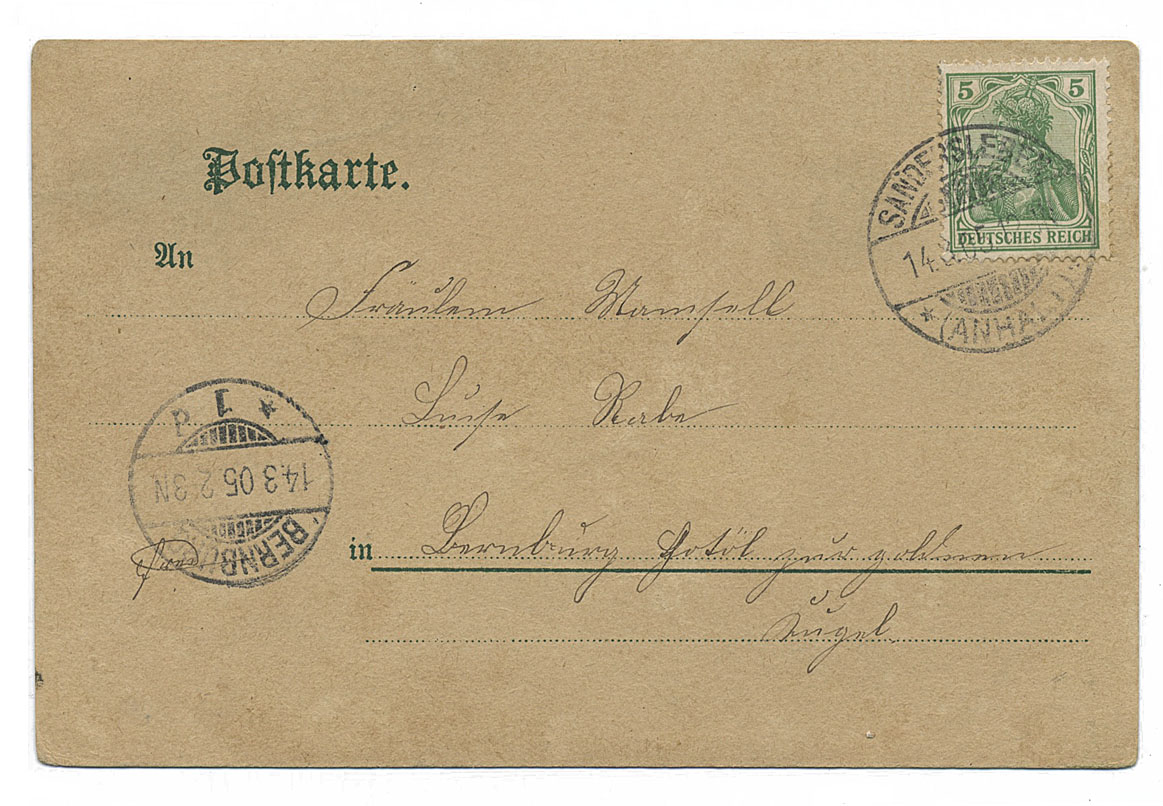

Mamsell (from the French Mademoiselle) was a historical Swedish honorific used for unmarried middle class women from about the mid 18th-century until 1866. The title was primarily used for women in the burgher and the clergy classes. The word was replaced after the middle of the 19th century by fröken, which had previously been a title used only for unmarried noblewomen.

== History ==
An earlier title for unmarried women in Sweden was jungfru. Previously, the title fru had also been reserved for noblewomen, but it began to also be used for people outside the nobility much earlier than fröken. Until 1719, when the Swedish court system was reformed, unmarried noblewomen were called hovjungfrur instead of hovfröknar.

In the 18th century, Mamsell became common, although unmarried noblewomen were called Fröken ('miss'). Similarly, the title Fru ('Mrs') was used only for married noblewomen, and married middle-class women were called Madam (from French Madame). After the parliamentary reform which abolished the Riksdag of the Estates in 1866, the title Fröken was allowed for all unmarried women, and the title Mamsell – as well as the married equivalent Madam – ceased to be used.

The reform was mentioned in the 1866–1867 New Year's show at the Royal Dramatic Theatre in Stockholm in the satirical song (which rhymes in Swedish):

Bort med mamseller, de gamla spöken!
Nu varje flicka får heta fröken,
om hon ej föredrar att bli fru
år 1867.

Away with mamsell'es, the old ghosts!
Now every girl can be a Miss,
Unless she prefers to be a Mrs
In 1867

At the Royal Dramatic Theatre, however, the reform was not introduced until after director Edholm was replaced in 1881.
