= Victoria (given name) =

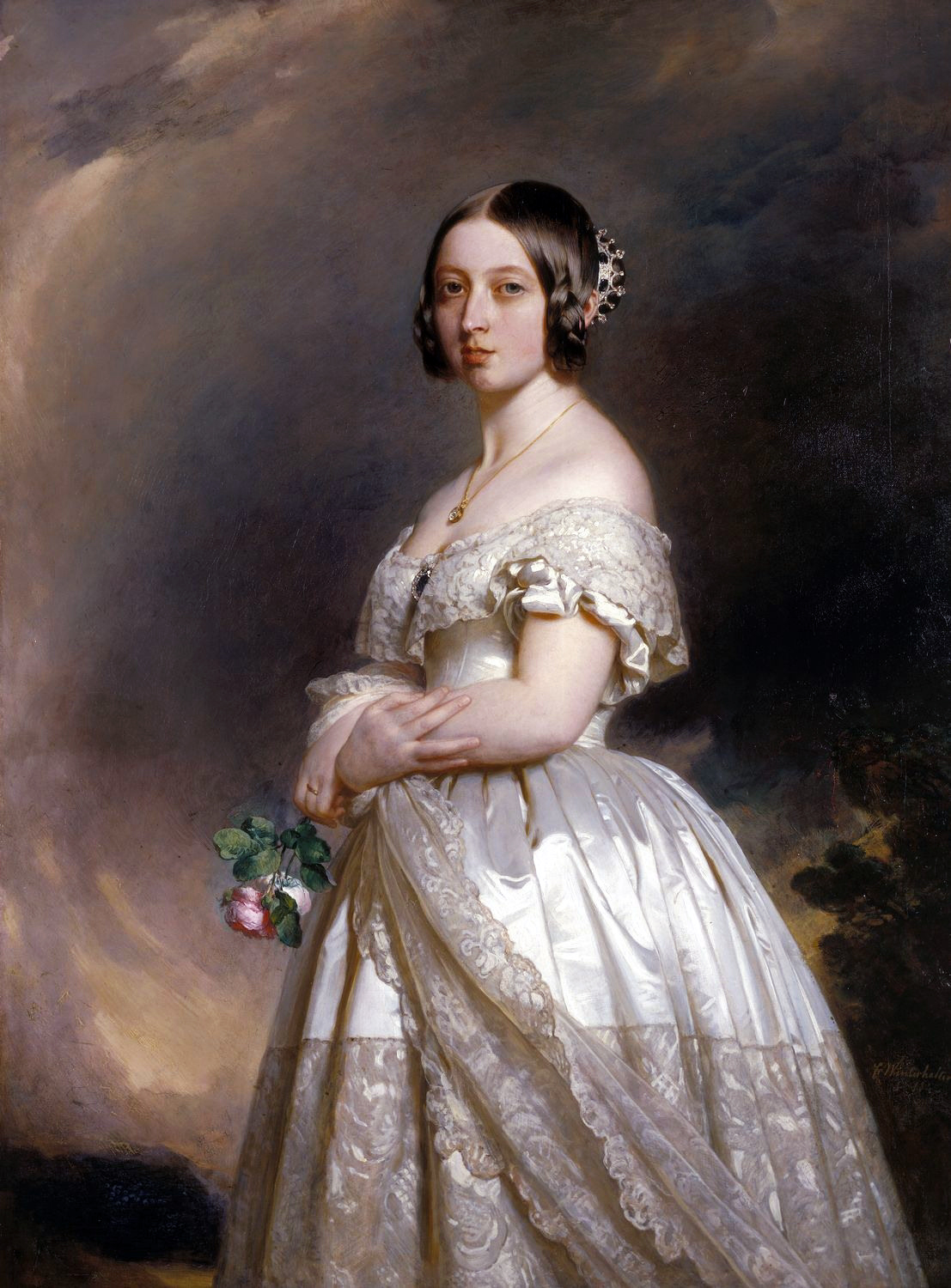
- Queen Victoria is the most famous historical bearer of the name.
- Pronunciation: /vɪkˈtɔːriə/
- Gender: female

Origin
- Origin: Latin victoria
- Meaning: Victory

Other names
- Nicknames: Tori, Vicky
- Related names: Victoire, Viktorie, Viktorija, Viktoriya, Vittoria, Wiktoria, Victor

Victoria is a feminine given name.

== Origin and popularity ==
Victoria is the Latin word for 'victory' and the feminine form of the masculine name Victor. In Roman mythology, Victoria was the name of the goddess of victory.

It has been a popular name in Anglophone countries since the reign of Queen Victoria in Britain in the 19th century, who was named after her German mother. It is also used in Spanish, Romanian, German, Swedish, Norwegian, Danish, and French.

== People ==
=== Royalty ===
- Empress Victoria (disambiguation)
- Queen Victoria (disambiguation)
  - Queen Victoria (1819–1901), Queen of the United Kingdom (r. 1837–1901) and Empress of India (r. 1876–1901)
- Princess Victoria, various princesses

=== Saints ===
- Saint Victoria (disambiguation)

=== Others ===
- Victoria Abril (born 1959), Spanish actress and singer
- Victoria Adams (disambiguation)
- Victoria Aleksanyan (born 1987), Armenian filmmaker
- Victoria Alonso (born 1965), Argentine film producer
- Victoria Amaya, Argentine indoor hockey player
- Victoria Amelina (1986–2023), Ukrainian novelist
- Victoria Anthony (born 1991), American wrestler
- Victoria Arlen (born 1994), American television personality
- Victoria Aitken (born 1965), British fashion model
- Victoria Atkin, English actress
- Victoria Atkins (born 1976), English politician
- Victoria Aveyard (born 1990), American writer
- Victoria Azarenka (born 1989), Belarusian tennis player
- Victoria Banks (born 1973), Canadian singer and songwriter
- Victoria Barbă (1926–2020), Moldovan filmmaker
- Viktoria Baškite (born 1985), Estonian chess player
- Victoria Bateman (born 1979), English academic and economist
- Victoria Beckham (born 1974), English singer, songwriter, fashion designer, and television personality
- Victoria Bergsman (born 1977), Swedish songwriter, musician, and vocalist
- Victoria Grace Blackburn (1865–1928), Canadian journalist and writer
- Victória Borges (born 2002), Brazilian rhythmic gymnast
- Victoria Borwick (born 1956), English politician
- Victoria Brittain (born 1942), British journalist and author
- Victoria Calvert (born 1981), American judge
- Victoria Canal (born 1998), Spanish-American singer-songwriter.
- Victoria Carbó (born 1963), Argentine field hockey player
- Victoria Carl (born 1995), German cross-country skier
- Victoria Carling, English actress
- Victoria Catlin (1952–2024), American actress
- Victoria Chaplina (born 1988), Russian volleyball player
- Viktória Chladoňová (born 2006), Slovak race cyclist
- Victoria Cirlot (born 1955), Spanish historian
- Victoria Clark (born 1959), American actress and singer
- Victoria Clarke (born 1959), American communications consultant
- Victoria Mary Clarke (born 1966), Irish journalist and writer
- Victoria Climbié (1991–2000), African-English murder victim
- Victoria Coren Mitchell (born 1972), English writer, presenter, and professional poker player
- Victoria Santa Cruz (1922–2014), Afro-Peruvian choreographer, composer and activist
- Victoria Cuenca (fl. 1928–1946), Argentine actress
- Victoria Dayneko (born 1987), Russian actress, singer, and songwriter
- Victoria De Angelis (born 2000), Italian–Danish bassist and songwriter
- Victoria de Lesseps (born 1994), French–American artist
- Victoria de Stefano (1940–2023), Italian–Venezuelan educator, essayist, novelist, and philosopher
- Victoria Derbyshire (born 1968), British journalist, newsreader and broadcaster
- Victoria Donda (born 1977), Argentine activist and politician
- Victoria Doudera, American politician
- Victoria Drummond (1894–1978), first woman marine engineer in the UK and first woman member of Institute of Marine Engineers
- Victoria Duffield (born 1995), Canadian singer, songwriter, dancer, and actress
- Victoria Dunlap (born 1989), American basketball player
- Victoria Edwards (born 1948), New Zealand artist, printmaker, and art educator
- Victoria Ekanoye (born 1981), English actress
- Victoria Forester (born 1974), Canadian author
- Victoria Fromkin (1923–2000), American linguist
- Victoria Furtună (born 1981), Moldovan prosecutor and politician
- Victoria Fyodorova (1946–2012), Russian–American actress and author
- Victoria García (born 1965), Spanish rhythmic dancer
- Victoria Georgieva (born 1997), Bulgarian singer and songwriter
- Victoria Quirino-Gonzalez (1931–2006), former first lady of the Philippines
- Victoria Gordon, Australian pharmaceutical researcher
- Victoria Gouramma (1841–1864), Indian princess
- Victoria Gowon (born 1946), Nigerian nurse and the third first lady of Nigeria
- Victoria Grace, emerita professor of sociology
- Victoria Groce (born 1981), American quiz player and game show contestant
- Victoria Hamilton (born 1971), English actress
- Victoria Hanna, Israeli multi-disciplinary artist, singer and musician
- Victoria Haralabidou, Greek actress
- Victoria Hart (born 1988), English jazz-pop singer
- Victoria Hislop (born 1959), English writer
- Victoria Horne (1911–2003), American actress
- Victoria Jackson (born 1959), American comedian and actress
- Victoria Johnson (born 1969), American author and historian
- Victoria Justice (born 1993), American actress, singer, and model
- Victoria Kakuktinniq (born 1989), Canadian Inuk fashion designer
- Victoria Kamāmalu (1838–1866), Hawaiian crown princess
- Victoria Kan (born 1995), Uzbekistani–born Russian tennis player
- Victoria Jenkins, British adaptive fashion designer and disability activist
- Victoria Kauma (born 1962), Namibian politician
- Victoria Jiménez Kasintseva (born 2005), Andorran tennis player
- Victoria Kaspi (born 1967), American–Canadian astrophysicist and professor
- Victoria Kawesa (born 1975), Ugandan–born Swedish politician
- Victoria Reggie Kennedy (born 1954), American diplomat, attorney, and activist
- Victoria Kennefick (fl. 2015-), Irish poet and academic
- Victoria Kent (1891–1987), Spanish lawyer and politician
- Victoria Kjær Theilvig (born 2003), Danish model and beauty pageant titleholder who was crowned Miss Universe 2024
- Victoria Koblenko (born 1980), Ukrainian–Dutch actress and columnist
- Victoria Kokhana (born 1990), Ukrainian musician
- Victoria Konefal, American actress
- Victoria Kwakwa, Ghanaian economist
- Victoria Lee (2004–2022), American mixed martial artist
- Victoria Legrand (born 1981), French–American musician
- Victoria Ann Lewis, American actress and theatre artist
- Victoria Loke (born 1992), Singaporean activist, actress, and model
- Victoria Lomasko (born 1978), Russian graphic artist
- Victoria Longley (1960–2010), Australian actress
- Victoria Lopyreva (born 1983), Russian television presenter, actress, and beauty pageant titleholder
- Victoria Manni (born 1994), Italian figure skater
- Victoria Mavridou (born 1991), Greek weightlifter
- Victoria Mboko (born 2006), Canadian tennis player
- Victoria Monét (born 1989), American singer and songwriter
- Victoria Moors (born 1996), Canadian artistic gymnast
- Victoria Moroles (born 1996), American actress
- Victoria Mxenge (1942–1985), South African activist, lawyer, and nurse
- Victoria Napolitano (born 1988), American politician
- Victoria Neave (born 1980), American attorney and politician
- Victoria Nuland (born 1961), American diplomat
- Victoria Nyame (died 1980), Ghanaian politician
- Victoria Ocampo (1890–1979), Argentine writer and intellectual
- Victoria Uzoamaka Onejeme (1930–2017), Nigerian attorney general
- Victoria Palacios (born 1977), Mexican race walker
- Victoria Pedretti (born 1995), American actress
- Victoria Pelova (born 1999), Dutch professional footballer
- Victoria Pendleton (born 1980), English jockey and former cyclist
- Victoria Poleva (born 1962), Ukrainian composer
- Victoria Powers (1958–2025), American mathematician
- Victoria Pratt (born 1970), Canadian actress
- Victoria Prentis (born 1971), British politician and barrister
- Victoria Price (born 1962), American public speaker and the author
- Victoria Principal (born 1950), Japanese–born American actress, author, entrepreneur, and producer
- Victoria Ransom, New Zealand entrepreneur
- Victoria Naicka Richard, known as Naïka (born 1995), American-born singer and songwriter
- Victoria Riskin (born 1945), American screenwriter
- Victoria Rodríguez, several people
- Victoria Roshchyna (1996–2024), Ukrainian journalist
- Victoria Rowell (born 1959), American actress and dancer
- Victoria Ruffo (born 1962), Mexican actress
- Victoria Sanchez, several people
- Victoria Kakoko Sebagereka (1946–2021), Ugandan politician and activist
- Victoria Silvstedt (born 1974), Swedish model and actress
- Victoria Sinitsina (born 1995), Russian figure skater
- Victoria Smurfit (born 1974), Irish actress
- Victoria Song (born 1987), Chinese actress, dancer, model, and singer
- Victoria Leigh Soto (1985–2012), American teacher, victim of Sandy Hook Elementary School shooting
- Victoria Spivey (1906–1976), American blues singer, songwriter, and record company founder
- Victoria Starmer (born c. 1973), British former solicitor and occupational health worker
- Viktória Strompová, Hungarian politician
- Victoria Spartz (born 1978), Ukrainian–American politician
- Victoria Jackson-Stanley (born 1953), American politician
- Victoria Swarovski (born 1993), Austrian businesswoman, singer, and television presenter
- Victoria Tennant (born 1950), English actress
- Victoria Thaine (born 1984), Australian actress
- Victoria Toensing (born 1941), American attorney
- Victoria Tolbert (1916–1997), First Lady of Liberia
- Victoria Trofimenko (born 1979), Ukrainian filmmaker
- Victoria Velásquez (born 1991), Danish politician
- Victoria Vetri (born 1944), American model and actress
- Victoria Villarruel (born 1975), Argentine lawyer and politician
- Victoria Velasquez Vincent (born 1995), New Zealand model and pageant titleholder
- Victoria Vivians (born 1994), American professional basketball player
- Victoria Vokes (1850–1894), British music hall, pantomime and burlesque actress and dancer
- Victoria Vox (born 1978), American singer, songwriter and musician
- Victoria Walker, known as PinkPantheress (born 2001), British singer, songwriter, and record producer
- Victoria, Lady Welby (1837–1912), English philosopher
- Victoria Williams (born 1958), American musician, singer, and songwriter
- Victoria Williamson (born 1993), English bobsledder and track cyclist
- Victoria Wood (1953–2016), English actress, comedian, singer, and writer
- Victoria Woodards (born 1965), American politician
- Victoria Woodhull (1838–1927), American leader of the women's suffrage movement
- Victoria Wyant (born 1999), English actress
- Victoria Wyndham (born 1945), American actress
- Victoria Yeates (born 1983), English actress
- Victoria Yakusha (born 1982), Ukrainian architect, designer, and artist
- Victoria Zhilinskayte (born 1989), Russian handball player
- Victoria Zuloaga (born 1988), Argentine field hockey player
- Victoria Zárate Zurita (1893–1964), Spanish teacher and trade unionist

== Fictional characters ==
- Tia Victoria, a character in the 2017 Pixar film Coco
- Victoria, a recurring character in How I Met Your Mother
- Victoria, the malicious vampire in the Twilight series, the antagonist of New Moon and Eclipse
- Victoria the White Cat, from Andrew Lloyd Webber's musical Cats
- Victoria the Violin Fairy, in the Rainbow Magic book series
- Victoria Newman Abbott, on the American soap opera The Young and the Restless
- Victoria Argent, mother to Alison in the MTV teen drama show Teen Wolf
- Victoria Belfry, an antagonist based on Lady Tremaine in the ABC series Once Upon a Time
- Victoria Best, a child prodigy in the animated television series WordGirl
- Victoria Davis, from the CW television series One Tree Hill
- Victoria "Vicki" Donovan, a high school girl turned into a vampire in the 2009–17 television drama The Vampire Diaries
- Victoria Everglot, a main character in the stop motion animated film Corpse Bride
- Victoria Flynn, character in the CBS comedy Mike & Molly
- Victoria Grayson, antagonist of the ABC television series Revenge (2011–2015)
- Victoria Hand, a Marvel Comics character
- Victoria Hardwick, a character in the first season of the television series Smallville
- Victoria Heyes, a character in the Terrifier franchise
- Victoria Lord, the principal character on the American soap opera One Life to Live
- Victoria Neuman, the neoconservative vice president of the United States from the TV series The Boys
- Victoria "Tory" Nichols, one of the main characters on the Netflix television series "Cobra Kai"
- Victoria Ratcliff, a character in season 3 of The White Lotus
- Victoria "Tory" Spring, a character in Heartstopper
- Victoria Steel, a minor antagonist in Dork Diaries
- Victoria Sugden, on the British soap opera Emmerdale
- Victoria "Vicki" Vale, a Batman supporting character in DC Comics
- Victoria Vance, the antagonist in Paw Patrol: The Mighty Movie
- Victoria "Tori" Vega, the lead character in the Nickelodeon series Victorious, played by Victoria Justice
- Victoria Waterfield, a Doctor Who companion in Doctor Who
- Victoria Winters, the young governess in Dark Shadows
- Principal Victoria, in South Park
- Princess Victoria "Tori", in the film Barbie: The Princess & the Popstar

== See also ==
- Victoria (disambiguation)
- Viktoria (disambiguation)
- Viktorija (disambiguation)
- Viktoriya
- Victoire, French form of the name
