= Victor =

The name Victor or Viktor may refer to:

- Victor (name), including a list of people with the given name, mononym, or surname

== Arts and entertainment ==
=== Film ===
- Victor (1951 film), a French drama film
- Victor (1993 film), a French short film
- Victor (2008 film), a TV film about Canadian swimmer Victor Davis
- Victor (2009 film), a French comedy
- Victor, a 2017 film about Victor Torres by Brandon Dickerson
- Viktor (2014 film), a Franco/Russian film
- Viktor (2024 film), a documentary of a deaf person's perspective during Russian invasion of Ukraine

=== Music ===
- Victor (Alex Lifeson album), a 1996 album by Alex Lifeson
- Victor (Vic Mensa album), 2023 album by Vic Mensa
- "Victor", a song from the 1979 album Eat to the Beat by Blondie

== Businesses ==
- Victor Talking Machine Company, early 20th century American recording company, forerunner of RCA Records
- Victor Company of Japan, usually known as JVC, a Japanese electronics corporation originally a subsidiary of the Victor Talking Machine Company
  - Victor Entertainment, or JVCKenwood Victor Entertainment, a Japanese record label
  - Victor Interactive Software, a Japanese video game software publisher and developer
- Victor Technology, known earlier as Victor Adding Machine Co. and Victor Comptometer, an American calculator company
- Victor (sports company), a Taiwanese manufacturer of sporting equipment
- Victor, a brand of mousetrap
- The Victor (comics), a British comic
- Fly Victor, an aviation charter company

== Military ==
- Victor-class submarine, NATO designation of a class of Soviet submarines
- Handley Page Victor, a Cold War era British strategic bomber aircraft
- Victor, the letter "V" in the NATO phonetic alphabet

== Places in the United States ==
- Victor, Arkansas
- Victor, California
- Victor, Colorado
- Victor, Idaho
- Victor, Indiana
- Victor, Iowa
- Victor, Kansas
- Victor, Montana
- Victor, New York
  - Victor (village), New York
- Victor, South Dakota
- Victor, Utah
- Victor, Fayette County, West Virginia
- Victor, Kanawha County, West Virginia
- Victor Township (disambiguation)

== Other uses ==
- Tropical Storm Victor, various storms named Victor
- TVS Victor, a motorcycle by TVS Motor Company
- Victor, formerly Empire Ben, a ship
- Victor (symbol), an emblem in some Spanish and Latin American universities
- Victor Valley, a valley in the U.S. state of California
- Victor, Wanswerd, a Dutch windmill
- Victor 3900, an old computer

== See also ==
- Pobednik ("The Victor"), a monument in Belgrade
- Saint-Victor (disambiguation), various places in France
- Vektor SS-77, a type of gun
- Vicky, a feminine given name
- Victa, an Australian manufacturer of mainly outdoor garden equipment
- The Victor (disambiguation)
- Victor Harbor (disambiguation)
- Victoria (disambiguation)
- Victorinus (disambiguation)
- Victorville (disambiguation)
- Victory (disambiguation)
- Viktoria (disambiguation)
- Viktorija (disambiguation)
- Viktors, a Latvian masculine given name
- Wiktor (name)
