= Viktoriya =

Female given name

- Gender: female

Origin
- Derivation: Latin victoria
- Meaning: "victory"
- Region of origin: Russia, Ukraine, Belarus, Bulgaria

Other names
- Related names: Victoria, Viktorija, Vittoria, Wiktoria, Victoire, Victor

Viktoriya (Russian: Виктория; Ukrainian: Вікторія) is a feminine given name, a variant of the name Victoria in several Slavic languages. It is derived from the Latin word victoria, meaning "victory".

Notable people with the name include:

- Viktoriya Agalakova (born 1996), Russian actress
- Viktoriya Andreyeva (born 1992), Russian swimmer
- Viktoriya Baginskaya (1926–2012), Soviet and Russian writer, teacher, collector of songs and folklorist
- Viktoriya Beloslydtseva (born 1972), Kazakhstani athlete
- Viktoriya Bondar (born 1995), Ukrainian cyclist
- Viktoriya Borshchenko (born 1986), Ukrainian handball player
- Viktoriya Burenok (born 1985), Ukrainian basketball player
- Viktoriya Dimitrova (born 1979), Bulgarian rower
- Viktoriya Divak (1993–2023), Russian handball player
- Viktoriya Dyakova (born 1993), Ukrainian archer
- Viktoriya Fomenko (born 1970), Ukrainian sprinter
- Viktoriya Fyodorova (born 1973), Russian high jumper
- Viktoriya Grafeyeva (born 2001), Kazakhstani boxer
- Viktoriya Grigorova (born 1990), Bulgarian volleyball player
- Viktoriya Gurova (born 1982), Russian triple jumper
- Viktoriya Hiryn (born 2000), Ukrainian footballer
- Viktoriya Hryb (born 1968), Ukrainian politician
- Viktoriya Isakova (born 1976), Russian actress
- Viktoriya Kazakevich (born 1998), Belarusian footballer
- Viktoriya Kesar (born 1993), Ukrainian diver
- Viktoriya Khitrinska (born 1991), Ukrainian diver
- Viktoriya Klimina (born 1976), Russian long-distance runner
- Viktoriya Klyugina (born 1980), Russian high jumper
- Viktoriya Kolb (born 1993), Belarusian shot putter
- Viktoriya Kolotinskaya (born 1995), Kazakhstani handball player
- Viktoriya Koshel (born 1991), Israeli rhythmic gymnast
- Viktoriya Koval (born 1985), Ukrainian archer
- Viktoriya Kovyreva (born 1975), Kazakhstani sprinter
- Viktoriya Kravchenko (born 1979), Ukrainian Paralympic athlete
- Viktoriya Kutuzova (born 1988), Ukrainian tennis player
- Viktoriya Leleka (born 1973), Ukrainian basketball player
- Viktoriya Lenyshyn (born 1991), Ukrainian rhythmic gymnast
- Viktoriya Lyan (born 1997), Kazakhstani archer
- Viktoriya Mikhnovich (born 1997), Belarusian acrobatic gymnast
- Viktoriya Mitina, Russian politician
- Viktoriya Molchanova (born 1982), Ukrainian long jumper
- Viktoriya Motrichko (born 1989), Ukrainian draughts player
- Viktoriya Nikiforova (born 2010), Uzbek rhythmic gymnast
- Viktoriya Olekh (born 1993), Ukrainian cross-country skier
- Viktoriya Paradiz (born 1968), Ukrainian basketball player
- Viktoriya Pastarnak (born 1997), Kazakhstani cyclist
- Viktoriya Pereverzeva (born 1996), Kazakhstani rhythmic gymnast
- Viktoriya Valentynivna Podhorna (born 1969), Ukrainian entrepreneur and politician
- Viktoriya Potapova (born 1974), Russian Paralympic judoka
- Viktoriya Potyekhina (born 1993), Ukrainian diver
- Viktoriya Prokopenko (born 1989), Russian triple jumper
- Viktoriya Pyatachenko (born 1989), Ukrainian sprinter
- Viktoriya Rybalko (born 1982), Ukrainian long jumper
- Viktoriya Rybovalova (born 1986), Ukrainian sport shooter
- Viktoriya Sasonkina (born 1988), Ukrainian fashion model
- Viktoriya Sazonova (born 1983), Kazakhstani ice hockey player
- Viktoriya Shaimardanova (born 1973), Ukrainian weightlifter
- Viktoriya Shkoda (born 1999), Russian association footballer
- Viktoriya Styopina (born 1976), Ukrainian high jumper
- Viktoriya Sudarushkina (born 1990), Russian javelin thrower
- Viktoriya Tihipko (born 1973), Ukrainian businessperson
- Viktoriya Titova (born 1971), Ukrainian fencer
- Viktoriya Tokareva (born 1937), Russian screenwriter and short story writer
- Viktoriya Tokonbayeva (born 1975), Kazakhstani sprinter
- Viktoriya Tolstoganova (born 1972), Russian film and theater actress
- Viktoriya Tomova (born 1995), Bulgarian professional tennis player
- Viktoriya Troytskaya (born 1969), Russian short track speed skater
- Viktoriya Turks (born 1987), Ukrainian judoka
- Viktoriya Tymoshenkova (born 1983), Ukrainian handball player
- Viktoriya Valyukevich (born 1982), Russian triple jumper
- Viktoriya Vershynina (born 1971), Ukrainian long jumper
- Viktoriya Yalovtseva (born 1978), Kazakhstani middle-distance runner
- Viktoriya Yermolyeva (born 1978), Ukrainian pianist
- Viktoriya Zyabkina (born 1992), Kazakhstani sprinter

== See also ==
- Viktoria (disambiguation)
- Viktorija (disambiguation)
