= Victoire =

Victoire (French, 'victory') or Victoires may refer to:

== People ==
- Victoire (name), list of people with the name
- Victoire of France (1733–1799), daughter of King Louis XV of France

== Places ==
- Victoire, Saskatchewan, Canada
- La Victoire, Nord, Haiti
- Victoire tram stop, Bordeaux, France

== Other uses ==
- French ship Victoire, the name of several ships
- HMS Victoire, the name of several British ships
- Victoire, a 2004 film, starring Sylvie Testud as Victoire
- Victoire (2023 film), also known as La Cordonnière, a Canadian drama film
- Disques Victoire, a Canadian independent record label
- Montreal Victoire, a women's hockey team

== See also ==
- Victory (disambiguation)
- Victorious (disambiguation)
- Victory Square (disambiguation), including Place de la Victoire
- Place des Victoires, in Paris, France
