= Krymchak =

Krymchak may refer to:

- Krymchak people
- Krymchak language
