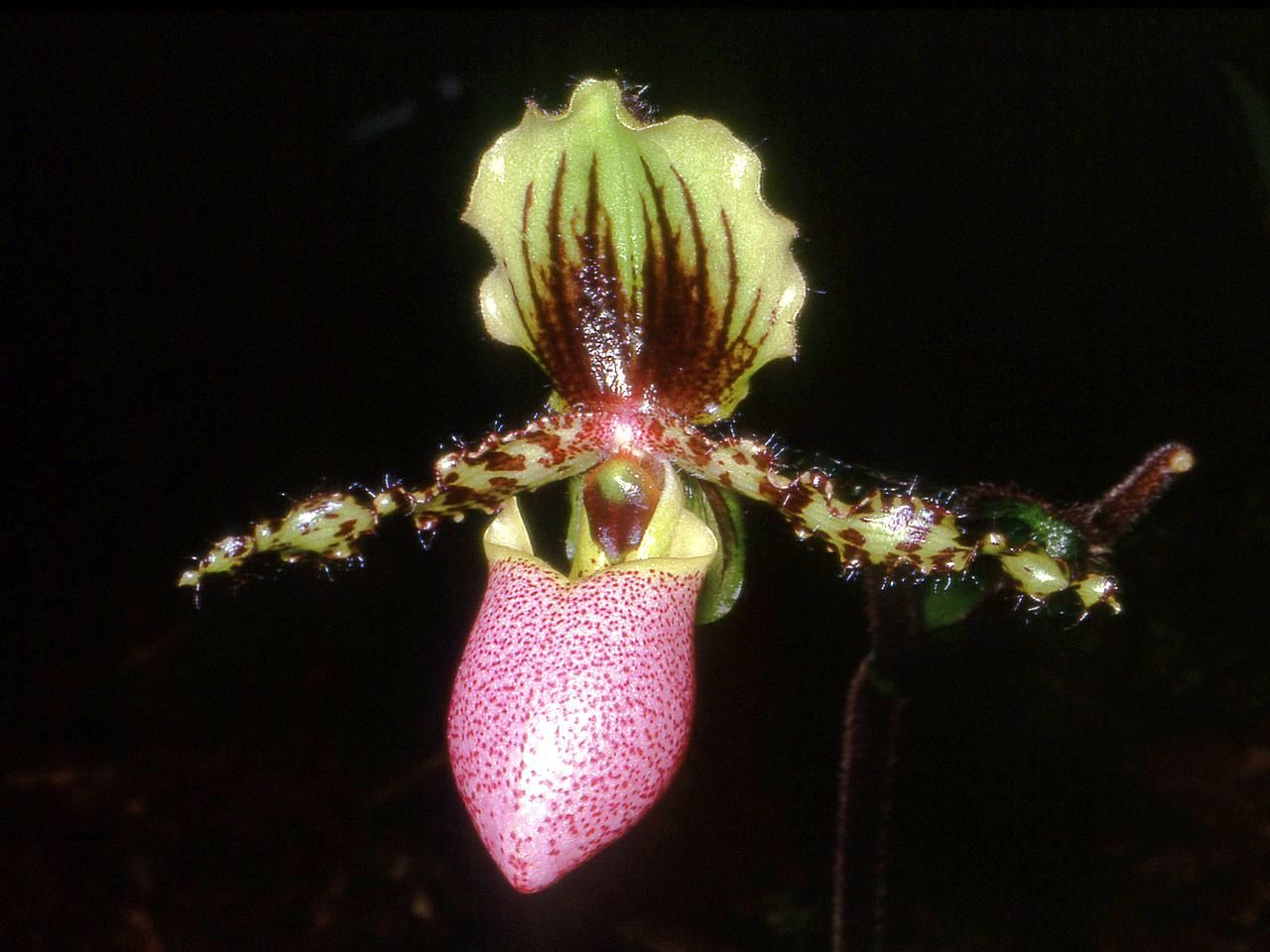
- Paphiopedilum victoria-regina

Scientific classification
- Kingdom: Plantae
- Clade: Tracheophytes
- Clade: Angiosperms
- Clade: Monocots
- Order: Asparagales
- Family: Orchidaceae
- Subfamily: Cypripedioideae
- Genus: Paphiopedilum
- Subgenus: Paphiopedilum subg. Cochlopetalum; Hallier f. ex Pfitzer

Type species
- Paphiopedilum victoria-regina

Species
- See text

= Paphiopedilum subg. Cochlopetalum =

Subgenus of flowering plants

Paphiopedilum subgenus Cochlopetalum is a subgenus of the genus Paphiopedilum.

== Distribution ==
Plants from this section are found in South East Asia in Indonesia and Malaysia.

== Species ==
Paphiopedilum subgenus Cochlopetalum comprises the following species:

Image	Name	Distribution	Elevation (m)
	Paphiopedilum dodyanum Cavestro 2017	Sumatra	1,300 metres (4,300 ft)
	Paphiopedilum glaucophyllum [J.J.Smith.]Pfitzer 1900	Indonesia, East and Southwest Java (Mount Semeru, Lumajang) and in Central Sumatra	200–700 metres (660–2,300 ft)
	Paphiopedilum liemianum (Fowlie) Karas. & Saito 1982	Sumatra (Gunong Sinabung), and Indonesia	550–1,000 metres (1,800–3,280 ft)
	Paphiopedilum moquetteanum (J.J.Sm.) Fowlie 1980	Java	300 metres (980 ft)
	Paphiopedilum primulinum M.W. Wood & P. Taylor 1973	Sumatra and Indonesia	0–520 metres (0–1,706 ft)
	Paphiopedilum victoria-mariae (Rolfe) Rolfe 1896	Sumatra (Bukittinggi)	1,980 metres (6,500 ft)
	Paphiopedilum victoria-regina (Sander) M.W. Wood 1976	Panang, Guanong Marapi, Sumatra and Indonesia	790–1,600 metres (2,590–5,250 ft)
