= Victorius =

Victorius may refer to:

== People ==
- Victorius of Aquitaine (fl. AD 457), who created the Victorian system of the Cursus Paschalis
- Victorius (dux) (died 489), an arvernian aristocratic, count of Auvergne and then dux of Aquitania
- Piero Vettori (1499-1585), known as Petrus Victorius, Italian writer, philologist and humanist.
- Saint Victorius, son of Saint Marcellus of Tangier
- Claudius Marius Victorius, teacher and poet of the fifth century CE

== Other uses ==
- Victorius (band), a German power metal band
- Victorius (comics), a character in the Marvel Comics Universe
- Victorius, a LNWR Renown Class locomotive

== See also ==
- Victorious (disambiguation)
- Victory (disambiguation)
- Victor (disambiguation)
- Victoria (disambiguation)
- Victorinus (disambiguation)
