= Vittoria =

Vittoria may refer to:

== People ==
- Vittoria (name), an Italian female given name, including a list of people
- Tomás Luis de Victoria or da Vittoria (c. 1548 – 1611), Spanish composer
- Alessandro Vittoria (1525–1608), Italian sculptor

== Places ==
- Vittoria, New South Wales, Australia
- Vittoria, Western Australia, Australia
- Vittoria, a community in Norfolk County, Ontario, Canada
- Vittoria, Sicily, Italy
- Vitoria-Gasteiz, Spain

== Other uses ==
- Vittoria (ship), the name of several vessels
- Vittoria (film), a 2024 drama film
- HMS Vittoria, two Royal Navy ships
- Vittoria, an 1867 novel by George Meredith
- Vittoria, a 1905 play by Margaret Sherwood
- Vittoria Coffee, an Australian manufacturer of coffee products
- Vittoria S.p.A., an Italian bicycle tire manufacturer
- Vittoria Vetra, an Angels & Demons character
- A.S.D. Calcio Club Vittoria 2020, an Italian football club, based in Vittoria, Sicily

== See also ==
- Vitoria (disambiguation)
- Vittorio
