= Wiktoria =

- Pronunciation: Polish: [vikˈtɔ.rja]
- Gender: female
- Language: Polish

Origin
- Derivation: Latin victoria
- Meaning: "victory"
- Region of origin: Poland

Other names
- Variant form: Wiktor (male)
- Related names: Victoria, Viktorija, Viktoriya, Vittoria, Victoire, Victor

Wiktoria (Polish: [vikˈtɔ.rja]) is a Polish feminine given name. It is the feminine form of Wiktor and the Polish form of the name Victoria. It is derived from the Latin word victoria, meaning "victory".

People with the given name include:

- Wiktoria Chołuj (born 2000), Polish wrestler
- Wiktoria Cieślak (born 2000), Polish chess player
- Wiktoria Czyżewska (born 2004), Polish mixed martial artist
- Viki Gabor (born 2007), birth name Wiktoria Gabor, Polish singer
- Wiktoria Gadajska (born 2006), Polish hurdler
- Wiktoria Gajosz (born 2006), Polish sprinter
- Wiktoria Gąsiewska (born 1999), Polish actress
- Wiktoria Goryńska (1902–1945), Polish painter and graphic artist
- Wiktoria Johansson (born 1996), Swedish singer
- Wiktoria Kiszkis (born 2003), Polish footballer
- Wiktoria Knap (born 1999), Polish equestrian
- Wiktoria Leszczyńska (fl. 1768), Polish stage actress
- Wiktoria Pikulik (born 1998), Polish professional racing cyclist
- Wiktoria Elżbieta Potocka (died c. 1670), Polish noble lady
- Wiktoria Śliwowska (1931–2021), Polish historian
- Wiktoria Ulma (1912–1944), rescuer of Polish Jewish families during the Holocaust
- Wiktoria Wolańska (born 1993), Polish actor
- Wiktoria Zieniewicz (born 2002), Polish footballer
