= Viktorie =

Viktorie is a Czech feminine given name, a form of the name Victoria. Notable people with the name include:

- Viktorie Bulínová (born 1998), Czech muay thai kickboxer
- Viktorie Ondrová (born 2005), Czech pole vaulter
- Viktorie Švejdová (born 2002), Czech ice hockey player

== See also ==
- SK Viktorie Jirny, a former Czech football club
- Viktoria (disambiguation)
