= Regina Victoria =

Regina Victoria may refer to:

- Regina Victoria, a latinate form of address for queens named Victoria; see Queen Victoria (disambiguation)
- Regina Victoria (provincial electoral district), a former provincial electoral district in Saskatchewan

== See also ==
- Victoria Regina (disambiguation)
