= Vittoria (name) =

- Pronunciation: Italian: [vitˈtɔ.rja]
- Gender: female
- Language: Italian

Origin
- Derivation: Latin victoria
- Meaning: "victory"
- Region of origin: Italy

Other names
- Variant form: Vittorio (male)
- Related names: Victoria, Viktorija, Viktoriya, Wiktoria, Victoire, Victor

Vittoria is an Italian feminine given name. It is the feminine form of Vittorio and the Italian form of the name Victoria. It is derived from the Latin word victoria, meaning "victory".

Notable people with the given name include:

- Vittoria Accoramboni (1557–1585), Italian noblewoman
- Vittoria Aganoor (1855–1910), Italian poet with Armenian ancestry
- Vittoria Aleotti (c. 1575 – after 1620), Italian Augustinian nun, a composer and organist
- Vittoria Alliata di Villafranca (born 1950), Italian author and translator
- Vittoria Archilei (fl. 1582–1620), Italian singer, dancer, and lutenist
- Vittoria Avanzini (1915–2001), Italian gymnast
- Vittoria Baldino (born 1988), Italian politician and lawyer
- Vittoria Belvedere (born 1972), Italian actress from Vibo Valentia in Calabria
- Vittoria Bentivoglio, singer in the 16th century Ferrarese court of Alfonso II d'Este
- Vittoria Bianco (born 1995), Italian Paralympic swimmer
- Vittoria Bogo Deledda (1967–2020), Italian politician
- Vittoria Bussi (born 1987), Italian cyclist
- Vittoria Caldoni (1805–1890), Italian artists' model
- Vittoria Ceretti (born 1998), Italian supermodel
- Vittoria Cesarini (1932–2023), Italian sprinter
- Vittoria Chierici (born 1955), Italian artist
- Vittoria Cocito (1891–1971), Italian painter and illustrator
- Vittoria Colizza, Italian scientist
- Vittoria Colonna (1492–1547), Italian noblewoman and poet
- Vittoria Colonna, Duchess of Sermoneta (1880–1954), Italian writer
- Vittoria Cremers (c. 1859–?), Italian Theosophist
- Vittoria Crispo (1900–1973), Italian actress
- Vittoria della Rovere (1622–1694), Grand Duchess of Tuscany as the wife of Grand Duke Ferdinando II
- Vittoria Di Silverio, Italian actress
- Vittoria Farnese (1618–1649), Italian noblewoman
- Vittoria Farnese, Duchess of Urbino (1519–1602), Italian noblewoman
- Vittoria Febbi (born 1939), Italian actress and voice actress
- Vittoria Ferdinandi (born 1986), Italian politician
- Vittoria Fontana (born 2000), Italian sprinter
- Vittoria Guazzini (born 2000), Italian cyclist
- Vittoria Ligari (1713–1783), Italian painter
- Vittória Lopes (born 1996), Brazilian triathlete
- Vittoria Ostuni Minuzzi (born 2001), Italian rugby union player
- Vittoria Mongardi (1926–1975), Italian singer and actress
- Vittoria Nenni (1915–1943), Italian resistance fighter
- Vittoria Paganetti (born 2006), Italian tennis player
- Vittoria Panizzon (born 1983), Italian equestrian
- Vittoria Piisimi, Italian opera singer
- Vittoria Puccini (born 1979), Italian film and television actress
- Vittoria Reati (born 1996), Italian cyclist
- Vittoria Risi (born 1978), Italian pornographic actress and television personality
- Vittoria Marianna Riva (1714–after 1791), Swiss noble and abbess
- Vittoria Salvini (born 1965), Italian mountain runner
- Vittoria Schisano (born 1977), Italian actress
- Vittória Seixas (born 2008), Brazilian actress and singer
- Vittoria Tarquini (1670–1746), Italian opera singer
- Vittoria Tesi (1701–1775), Italian opera singer
- Vittoria Titomanlio (1899–1988), Italian politician
- Vittoria Valmaggia (1944–2009), Italian artist
- Vittoria Vecchini (born 2002), Italian rugby union player
- Vittoria Yeo (born 1980), South Korean soprano

== See also ==
- Vittoria (disambiguation)
- Vittorio
