= Vict. =

Vict. may refer to:

- Marie-Victorin Kirouac (1885–1944), Canadian botanist
- Queen Victoria (1819–1901), Queen of the United Kingdom
- Victoria (Australia)

== See also ==
- Victor (disambiguation)
- Victoria (disambiguation)
