= Victoria Regina =

Victoria Regina or variation, may also refer to:

- Victoria Regina (or Victoria R.), a latinate form of address for queens named Victoria, see Queen Victoria (disambiguation)
- Victoria Regina (play), a 1934 stageplay by Laurence Housman about Queen Victoria
- Victoria Regina (film), a 1961 U.S. telemovie about Queen Victoria
- Victoria Regina (painting), an 1887 painting by Henry Tanworth Wells
- Paphiopedilum victoria-regina (P. victoria-regina), a species of orchid found in Sumatra
- Victoria amazonica (synonym: Victoria regina, V. regina), a species of water lily found in Guyana, and its national flower
- Victoria Regina Spivey (1906–1976), U.S. blues singer

== See also ==
- Victoria Avenue (Regina, Saskatchewan), Canada
- Victoria Park, Regina, Saskatchewan, Canada
- Regina Victorias, several sports teams in Regina, Saskatchewan, Canada
- Regina Victoria (disambiguation)
