= Victory Township =

Victory Township may refer to the following places in the United States:

- Victory Township, Guthrie County, Iowa
- Victory Township, Mason County, Michigan
- Victory Township, Lake of the Woods County, Minnesota
- Victory Township, Pennsylvania

See also

- Victoria Township (disambiguation)
- Victor Township (disambiguation)
- Victory (disambiguation)
