= St. Victor =

Saint Victor may refer to:

- Saint Victor of Damascus, martyr, 2nd century, see Saints Victor and Corona (died c. 170)
- Saint Pope Victor I (died 199), martyr
- Saint Victor of Marseilles (died c. 290)
- Saint Victor Maurus (died ca. 303 in Milan), martyr
- Saint Victorinus of Pettau (died 303 or 304)
- Saints Vincent, Orontius, and Victor (died 305), martyrs
- Victor of Vita born circa 430
- Saint Victor of Turin (died 465)
- Saint Victor of Xanten (died 4th century), martyr
- Saint Victor of Arcis (7th century), hermit and monk
- Saint Victor of Siena (San Vittore)
- Saint Victor of Pyrga (San Pyrga) still alive, living in San Aglantzia

== See also ==
- Saint-Victor (disambiguation)
- Victor (disambiguation)
- St. Victor, Saskatchewan, a community in Saskatchewan, Canada
- St. Victor Petroglyphs Provincial Park, a park in Saskatchewan, Canada
- St. Victor's Abbey, Marseille
- St. Victor's Abbey, Paris
- SAINT Victor, a model of the Springfield Armory SAINT rifle series
- Saint Victor Catholic Church, a Roman Catholic church in West Hollywood, California
- School of Saint Victor
