= Victoire (name) =

- Pronunciation: French: [vik.twaʁ]
- Gender: female
- Language: French

Origin
- Derivation: Latin victoria
- Meaning: "victory"

Other names
- Nickname: Vicky
- Related names: Victoria, Viktorija, Viktoriya, Vittoria, Wiktoria,

Victoire is a French feminine given name. It is the French form of the name Victoria . It is derived from the Latin word victoria, meaning "victory".

Notable people with the name include:

- Victoire of France (1733–1799), daughter of King Louis XV of France
- Victoire Agbanrin-Elisha, Beninese judge
- Victoire Babois (1760–1839), French poet and writer of elegies
- Victoire Berteau (born 2000), French cyclist
- Victoire Cogevina Reynal, Argentine and American businesswoman
- Victoire Conen de Saint-Luc (1761–1794), French noble and nun
- Victoire Conroy (1819–1866), a disliked childhood companion of the future Queen Victoria
- Victoire de Donnissan de La Rochejaquelein (1772–1857), French memoirist
- Victoire Doutreleau (born 1934), French fashion model
- Victoire Du Bois (born 1988/89), French actress
- Victoire Ferrari (1785–1823), French pianist and singing teacher
- Victoire Jasmin (1955–2023), French politician
- Victoire Jean-Baptiste (1861–1923), Haitian politician de facto as mistress of President Florvil Hyppolite
- Victoire Léodile Béra (1824–1900), French novelist, journalist and feminist
- Victoire Ndikumana, Burundian politician
- Victoire L'or Ngon Ntame (born 1985), Cameroonian volleyball player
- Victoire Piteau (born 1999), French boxer
- Victoire Rasoamanarivo (1848–1894), woman from Madagascar who devoted her life to the poor and the sick, beatified in 1989
- Victoire de Rohan (1743–1807), Princess of Guéméné, French noblewoman and governess of the children of King Louis XVI of France
- Victoire Saulnier, French ballet dancer
- Victoire Thivisol (born 1991), French film actress
- Victoire Tomegah Dogbé (born 1959), Togolese politician, Prime Minister of Togo
- Victoire Ingabire Umuhoza (born 1968), Rwandan politician
- Victoire Van Nuffel (born 1937), Belgian cyclist
- Victoire Wirix (1875–1938), Dutch artist

== See also ==
- Victoire (disambiguation)
