= Victor, West Virginia =

Victor, West Virginia may refer to:

- Victor, Fayette County, West Virginia, an unincorporated community in Fayette County
- Victor, Kanawha County, West Virginia, an unincorporated community in Kanawha County
