= Victoria Township =

Victoria Township may refer to one of the following places:

In Canada

- Victoria Township, Algoma District, Ontario

In the United States

- Victoria Township, Jefferson County, Arkansas
- Victoria Township, Knox County, Illinois
- Victoria Township, Cass County, Iowa
- Victoria Township, Ellis County, Kansas
- Victoria Township, Rice County, Kansas
- Victoria Township, Custer County, Nebraska
- Victoria Township, McLean County, North Dakota

See also

- Victoria (disambiguation)
- Victor Township (disambiguation)
- Victory Township (disambiguation)
