= Antonio Buero Vallejo =

Spanish playwright (1916–2000)

The Most Excellent Antonio Buero Vallejo
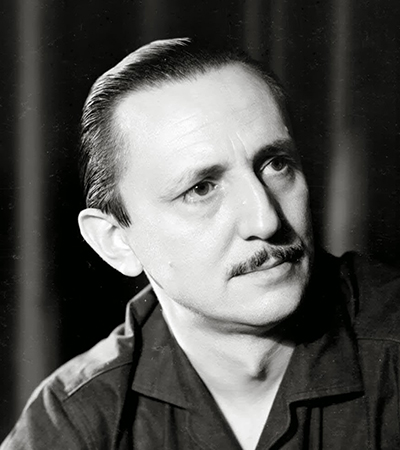
- Born: Antonio Buero Vallejo; 29 September 1916; Guadalajara, Spain
- Died: 29 April 2000 (aged 83); Madrid, Spain
- Occupation: Playwright
- Spouse: Victoria Rodríguez

Seat X of the Real Academia Española
- In office 21 May 1972 – 29 April 2000
- Preceded by: Antonio Rodríguez-Moñino
- Succeeded by: Francisco Brines

Antonio Buero Vallejo (September 29, 1916 – April 29, 2000) was a Spanish playwright associated with the Generation of '36 movement and considered the most important Spanish dramatist of the Spanish Civil War.

== Biography ==
During his career he won three National Theatre Prizes (in 1957, 1958 and 1959), a National Theatre Prize for all his career in 1980, the National Literature Prize in 1996, and the Miguel de Cervantes Prize, Spain's highest literary honour, in 1986. From 1971 until his death he was a member of the Real Academia Española.

From 1934 to 1936 Buero Vallejo studied art and painting at San Fernando Escuela de Arte, in Madrid. During the civil war he joined the Communist Party of Spain and served as a medical aid in the Republican Army.

After the war he was imprisoned for six years. After being released he wrote Story of a Stairway in 1949. This work presented a graphic picture of Spain after the Civil War and won the Lope de Vega Prize, establishing Vallejo as one of the foremost authors in Spain. While other authors left Spain to escape Franco's censorship, Vallejo stayed in Spain and used symbolism to criticise the government. In 1971, he was elected to the Royal Spanish Academy. In 1994 he was awarded the Gold Medal of Merit in Fine Arts and the Gold Medal of the Society of Authors of Spain.

He died due to a stroke on April 29, 2000, aged 83.

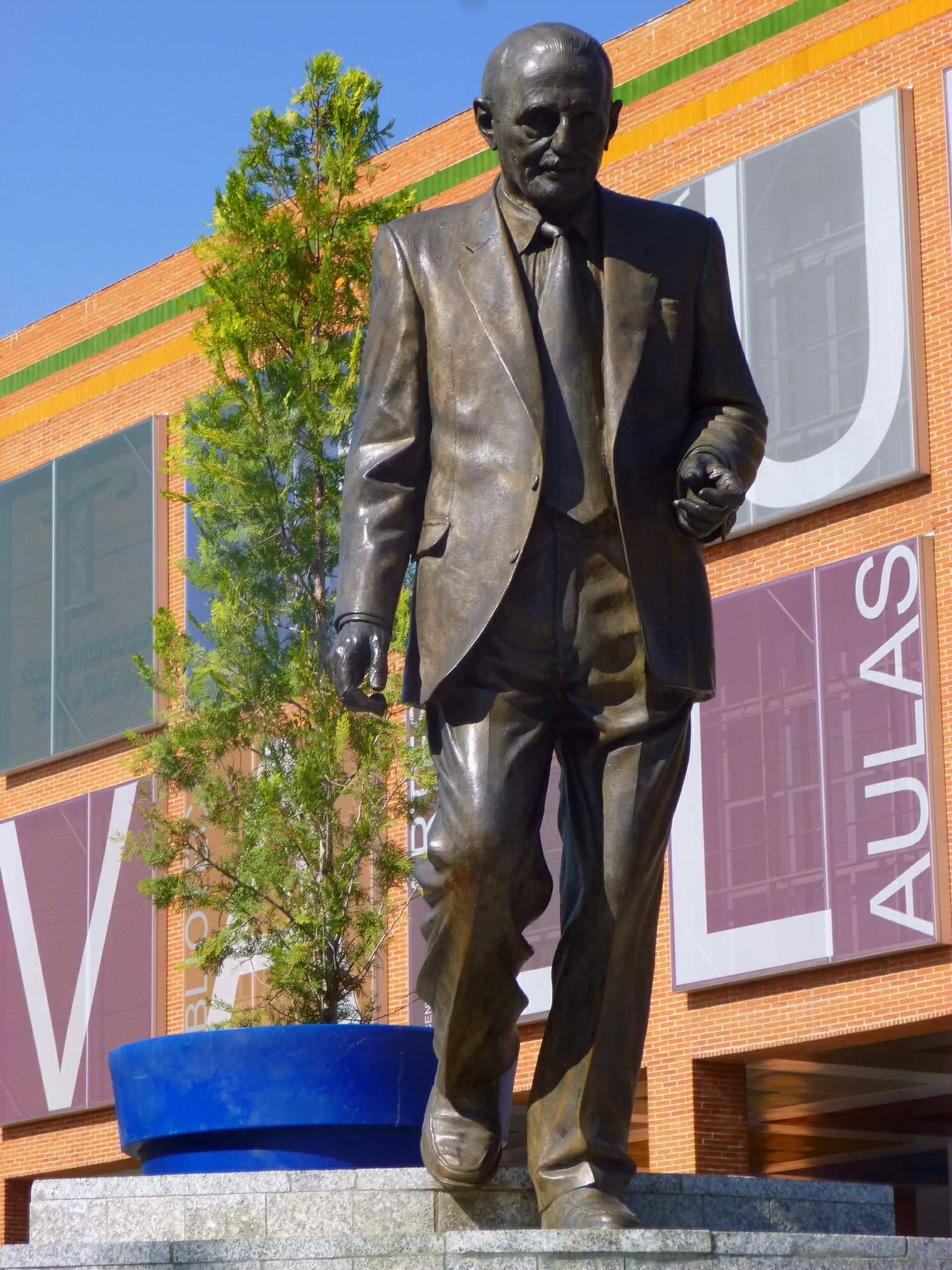
Monument to Antonio Buero Vallejo at the Buero Vallejo Cultural Centre in Madrid

A common theme in his work is Spain's problems during and after Franco. In the tragedies there is always a sense of hope for the future. His works make frequent use of the symbolism of the senses—for example, using the "fiery darkness," in which the protagonist cannot see, as a symbol of Spain's dark situation.

== Awards ==
- Miguel de Cervantes Prize 1986
- National Theatre Prize 1957, 1958, 1959, & 1996

== Works ==
- Historia de una escalera ("Story of a Stairway") (1949)
- Las palabras en la arena ("The Words in the Sand") (1949)
- En la ardiente oscuridad ("In The Burning Darkness") (1950)
- La tejedora de sueños ("The Weaver of Dreams") (1952)
- La señal que se espera (1952)
- Casi un cuento de hadas (1953)
- Madrugada (1953)
- Irene o el tesoro (1954)
- Las cartas boca abajo (1957)
- Hoy es fiesta (1955)
- Un soñador para un pueblo (1958)
- Las Meninas (1960)
- El concierto de San Ovidio ("The concert at Saint-Ovide Fair") (1962)
- Aventura en lo gris (1963)
- El tragaluz ("The basement window") (1967)
- La doble historia del doctor Valmy ("The double-case history of Doctor Valmy") (1968)
- El sueño de la razón ("The Sleep of Reason") (1970)
- La detonación ("The Shot") (1977)
- Llegada de los dioses (1971)
- La Fundación ("The Foundation") (1974)
- Jueces en la noche ("Judges in the Night") (1979)
- Caimán (1981)
- Diálogo secreto (1984)
- Lázaro en el laberinto (1986)
- Música cercana ("The music window") (1989)
- Las trampas del azar (1994)
- Misión al pueblo desierto (1999)

== See also ==
- Café Gijón (Madrid)
