= Victoria of the United Kingdom (disambiguation) =

Victoria of the United Kingdom (1819–1901; r. 1837–1901) was Queen of the United Kingdom.

Victoria of the United Kingdom or Victoria of Great Britain may also refer to:

- Victoria, Princess Royal (1840–1901), German Empress and eldest daughter of Queen Victoria
- Princess Victoria of the United Kingdom (1868–1935), second daughter of Edward VII, granddaughter of Queen Victoria

== See also ==
- Princess Victoria (disambiguation)
- Queen Victoria (disambiguation)
