= Princess Victoria =

Princess Victoria or Princess Viktoria may refer to:

== People ==
=== British royalty ===
- Victoria of the United Kingdom (disambiguation)

=== Continental European royalty ===
- Princess Victoria of Saxe-Coburg-Saalfeld, (1786–1861), mother of Queen Victoria
- Princess Victoria of Saxe-Coburg and Gotha (1822–1857), wife of Prince Louis of Orléans, Duke of Nemours
- Victoria, Princess Royal (1840–1901), eldest daughter of Queen Victoria and Empress of Germany and Queen of Prussia as the wife of Frederick III
- Princess Victoria of Baden (1862–1930), queen consort of Gustav V of Sweden
- Princess Victoria of Hesse and by Rhine (1863–1950), wife of Prince Louis of Battenberg; later Victoria Mountbatten, Marchioness of Milford Haven
- Princess Viktoria of Prussia (1866–1929), second daughter of Victoria, Princess Royal and Frederick III of Germany
- Princess Victoria Mary of Teck (1867–1953), wife of George V of the United Kingdom
- Princess Victoria Melita of Saxe-Coburg and Gotha (1876–1936), daughter of Alfred, Duke of Saxe-Coburg and Gotha; later Grand Duchess Victoria Feodorovna of Russia
- Princess Victoria Adelaide of Schleswig-Holstein (1885–1970), daughter of Karoline Mathilde of Schleswig Holstein and Frederick Ferdinand, Duke of Schleswig-Holstein and Duchess of Saxe-Coburg and Gotha as the wife of Charles Edward
- Princess Victoria Luise of Prussia (born 1982), daughter of Prince Friedrich Wilhelm of Prussia (born 1939) and wife of Ferdinand, Hereditary Prince of Leiningen (born 1982)
- Princess Victoria Eugenie of Battenberg (1887–1969), Queen of Spain as the wife of Alfonso XIII
- Princess Victoria Margaret of Prussia (1890–1923), daughter of Prince Frederick Leopold of Prussia
- Princess Victoria Louise of Prussia (1892–1980), daughter of Augusta Victoria of Schleswig-Holstein and Wilhelm II of Germany; married Ernst August, Duke of Brunswick and head of the House of Hanover
- Princess Viktoria Cäcilie of Hesse-Philippsthal-Barchfeld (1914–1998), daughter of Chlodwig, Landgrave of Hesse-Philippsthal-Barchfeld
- Victoria, Crown Princess of Sweden (born 1977), heiress apparent of Carl XVI Gustaf of Sweden
- Princess Viktória de Bourbon de Parme (born 1982), wife of Prince Jaime de Bourbon de Parme
- Princess Victoria Romanovna (born 1982), wife of Grand Duke George Mikhailovich of Russia

=== Hawaiian royalty ===
- Princess Victoria Kamamalu Kaahumanu IV of the Hawaiian Islands (1838–1866), heiress apparent during the reign of Kamehameha V
- Princess Victoria Kaʻiulani of the Hawaiian Islands (1875–1899), heiress apparent during Queen Liliuokalani's reign

=== Other people ===
- Princess Victoria (wrestler), stage name of American retired professional wrestler Vickie Otis (born 1962)

== Ships ==
- MV Princess Victoria (1939), a ship which was launched in 1939 commissioned as HMS Princess Victoria and sunk in 1940
- MV Princess Victoria (1946), a ferry which was launched in 1947 and sank in 1953
- SS Princess Victoria, a steamship build in 1902

== Other uses ==
- Princess Victoria "Tori" of Meribella (Victoria Bethany Evangeline Renee), a character from the 2012 film Barbie: The Princess & the Popstar
- Princess Victoria of Alteon ("Robina the Hood"), a character from the online game AdventureQuest Worlds
- Princess Victoria, Shepherd's Bush, London, England, a pub

== See also ==
- Empress Victoria (disambiguation)
- Queen Victoria (disambiguation)
- Victoria (given name)
