= Vittoria (ship) =

Vittoria has been the name of several vessels:

- Victoria (ship) (or Nao Victoria, as well as Vittoria), was a Spanish carrack and the first ship to circumnavigate the world.

British vessels launched in 1813 or shortly thereafter with the name Vittoria were probably named for General Wellington's victory over the French at the Battle of Vitoria.

- Adriatic (1811 ship) was launched in 1811 in the United States. The British Royal Navy seized her in July 1812. She was sold in 1813 and her new owners named her Vittoria. She traded with the West Indies, the Mediterranean, and the Indian Ocean. She was last listed in 1834.
- Vittoria (1812 ship) was launched at South Shields. She spent much of her career sailing as a transport, primarily across the Atlantic to Quebec, and later Honduras, though she visited Malta once. She disappeared in late 1830.
- Vittoria (1813 ship) was a schooner launched at Baltimore in 1811 under another name. British owners acquired her in 1813, probably as a prize, and renamed her. She became a privateer sailing out of Guernsey and captured at least three vessels trading between the United States and France. She disappeared from online records circa 1814, though she remained listed to 1818 with data unchanged from 1813. A French privateer may have captured her in 1814.
- Vittoria (1813 Gainsborough ship) was built at Gainsborough. She made one voyage transporting convicts to Australia. She was last listed in 1854.
- Vittoria, of 226 tons (bm), was launched in 1813 by R & J Bulmer, South Shields.
- Vittoria (1813 Whitby ship) was launched at Whitby in 1813 as a transport. A new owner shifted her registration to London in December 1817. She then traded with India under a license from the British East India Company. She was condemned at Calcutta in 1820 and sold for breaking up in October.
- Vittoria (1813 Whitehaven ship) was launched at Whitehaven in 1813 as a West Indiaman. Pirates captured and wrecked her in 1822.

== See also ==
- HMS Vittoria, two ships of the Royal Navy
