= Viktorija (given name) =

Female given name

- Gender: female
- Name day: 23 December (Lithuania and Latvia); 22 December (Croatia)

Origin
- Derivation: Latin victoria
- Meaning: "victory"
- Region of origin: Lithuania, Latvia, North Macedonia, Slovenia, Croatia, Serbia

Other names
- Related names: Victoria, Viktoriya, Vittoria, Wiktoria, Victoire, Victor

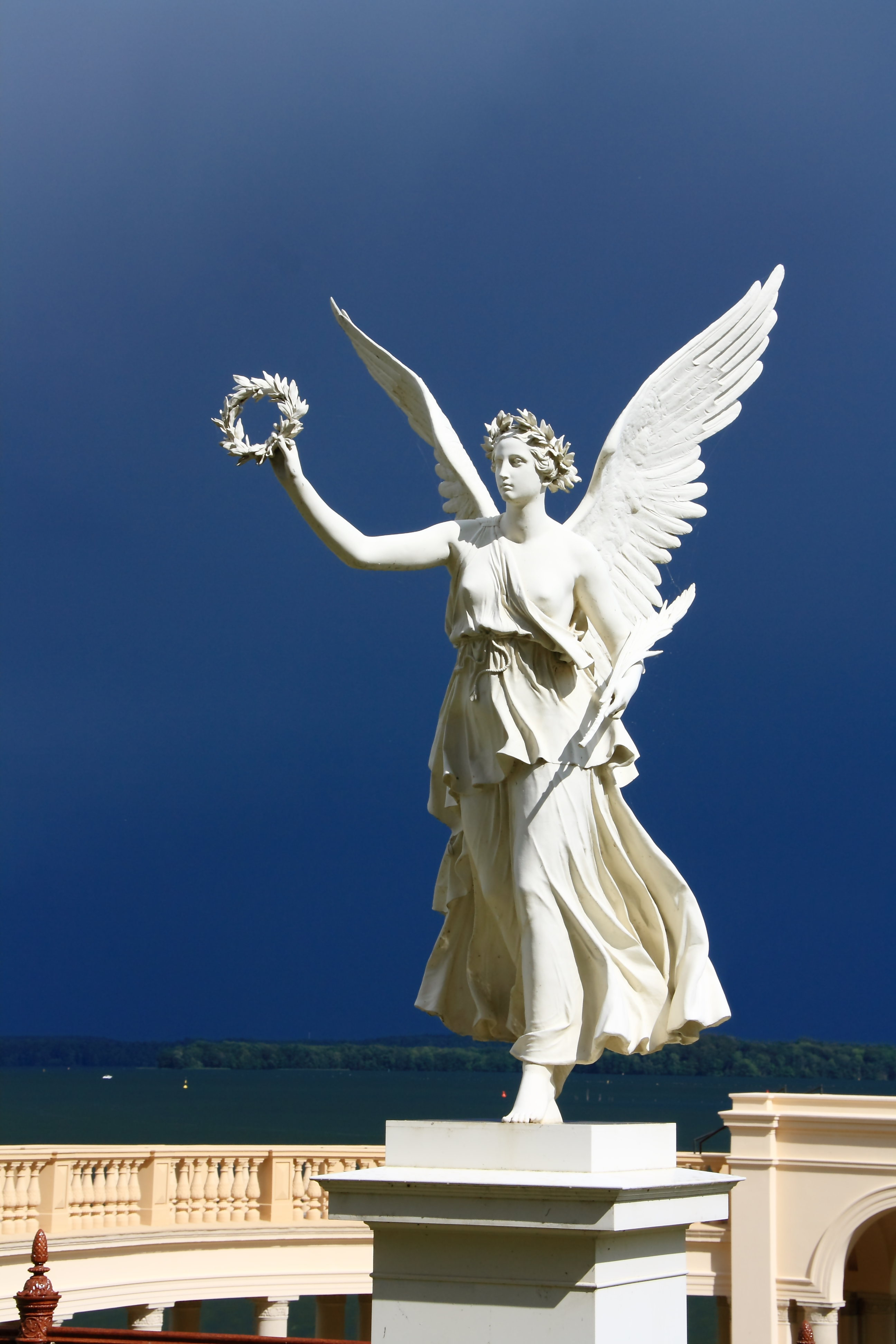
Victoria statue at Schwerin Castle.

Viktorija is a feminine given name, a variant of the name Victoria in several languages. It is derived from the Latin word victoria, meaning "victory".

Notable people with the name include:

- Viktorija (singer) (Snežana Mišković; born 1958), Serbian rock singer
- Viktorija Andrulytė (born 1992), Lithuanian yacht racer
- Viktorija Budrytė-Winnersjo (born 1989), Lithuanian footballer
- Viktorija Čmilytė (born 1983), Lithuanian chess grandmaster and politician
- Viktorija Daniliauskaitė (born 1951), Lithuanian printmaker and book illustrator
- Viktorija Daujotytė (born 1944), Lithuanian literary critic and philologist
- Viktorija Doneva (born 1991), Macedonian footballer
- Viktorija Golubic (born 1992), Swiss tennis player
- Viktorija Karatajūtė-Šarauskienė (1948–2007), Lithuanian ceramic artist
- Viktorija Loba (born 1988), Russian-born Macedonian pop singer
- Viktorija Nedeva (born 2003), Macedonian footballer
- Viktorija Ni (born 1991), Latvian-American chess player
- Viktorija Novosel (born 1989), Croatian pop singer
- Viktorija Panchurova (born 1999), Macedonian footballer
- Viktorija Rajicic (born 1994), Australian tennis player
- Viktorija Senkutė (born 1996), Lithuanian rower
- Viktorija Todorovska (born 2000), Macedonian cross-country skier
- Viktorija Vengreviča (born 1997), Latvian footballer
- Viktorija Zaičikova (born 2000), Latvian footballer
- Viktorija Žemaitytė (born 1985), Lithuanian heptathlete
