= Vitoria =

Vitoria or Vitória may refer to:

== People ==
- Francisco de Vitoria (c. 1483–1546), a Spanish Renaissance theologian
- Alberto Vitoria (1956–2010), Spanish footballer
- Rui Vitória (born 1970), Portuguese retired footballer
- Sofia Vitória (born 1979), Portuguese singer
- Steven Vitória (born 1987), Canadian soccer player

== Places ==
=== Brazil ===
- Vitória, Espírito Santo, capital city of the state of Espírito Santo
- Vitória (island), on which the city in Espírito Santo is located
- Vitória de Santo Antão, city in Pernambuco
- Vitória da Conquista, city in the state of Bahia
- Greater Vitória, an administrative unit of Brazil
- Vitória Brasil, a municipality in the state of São Paulo, Brazil
- Roman Catholic Archdiocese of Vitória, Brazil
- Vitória, Salvador, a neighborhood in the Brazilian city of Salvador in the state of Bahia

=== Portugal ===
- Vitória (Porto), a parish of the Portuguese city of Porto

=== Spain ===
- Roman Catholic Diocese of Vitoria, Spain
- Vitoria-Gasteiz, the capital city of the province of Álava and of the autonomous community of the Basque Country in northern Spain

== Sports clubs ==
=== Brazil ===
- Esporte Clube Vitória, a football club in the Brazilian city of Salvador
- Vitória Futebol Clube (ES), a football club in the Brazilian city of Vitória
- Esporte Clube Primeiro Passo Vitória da Conquista, a football club in the Brazilian city of Vitória da Conquista
- Associação Acadêmica e Desportiva Vitória das Tabocas, a football club in the Brazilian city of Vitória de Santo Antão
- Associação Desportiva Vitória, a football club in the Brazilian city of Vitória de Santo Antão

=== Portugal ===
- Vitória F.C., a football club in the Portuguese city of Setúbal
- Vitória F.C. (handball), in Setúbal
- Vitória S.C., a football club in the Portuguese city of Guimarães
- Vitória S.C. (basketball), a basketball team in Guimarães
- Vitória S.C. (volleyball), a volleyball team in Guimarães
- Vitória S.C. (cycling team), a Portuguese cycling team based in Guimarães and Vila do Conde

=== Elsewhere ===
- CD Vitoria, a football team based in Vitoria-Gasteiz, Spain
- Vitória FC (Riboque), a football team based in São Tomé

== Other uses ==
- Vitória (2014 TV series), a 2014 Brazilian telenovela by Rede Record
- Vitória (film), a 2025 Brazilian drama film directed by Andrucha Waddington
- A Vitória, the name of Symphony No. 4 (Villa-Lobos)
- Battle of Vitoria, an 1813 battle of the Peninsular War
- Spanish ironclad Vitoria, a Spanish Navy armored frigate in commission from 1868 to 1908
- Duque da Vitória, a Portuguese title of nobility first bestowed on the Duke of Wellington
- TV Vitória, a television station in Vitória, Espirito Santo, Brazil

== See also ==
- Victoria (disambiguation)
- Vittoria (disambiguation)
