= Victor Harbor =

Victor Harbor may refer to:

== Places in South Australia ==
- Victor Harbor, South Australia, a locality
- Victor Harbor High School
- City of Victor Harbor, a local government area

== Transport ==
- Victor Harbor Horse Drawn Tram
- Victor Harbor Road
- Victor Harbor railway line

== Other ==
- Victor Harbor Football Club, an Australian rules football club in South Australia
- Victor Harbor Times, a newspaper in South Australia
- Port Victor (disambiguation)
