= Viktorija =

Viktorija may refer to:

- Viktorija (given name), including a list of people with this name
- Viktorija (singer), Serbian singer

== See also ==
- Viktoriya
- Viktoria (disambiguation)
- Victoria (disambiguation)
- Viktor (disambiguation)
- Victor (disambiguation)
