= Port Victor =

Port Victor may refer to:

== Ships ==
- SS Port Victor
- MV Port Victor

== Places ==
- Victor Harbor, South Australia, previously known as Port Victor
- Victor Port, Gujarat, India
