= Victoria Rodríguez =

Victoria Rodríguez may refer to:

- Victoria Rodríguez Ceja (born 1977), Mexican economist, governor of the central bank
- Victoria Rodríguez Clavijo (1931–2020), Spanish actress
- Victoria Rodríguez (television presenter) (born 1972), Uruguayan actress and television presenter
- Victoria Rodríguez (tennis) (born 1995), Mexican tennis player
- Victoria Rodríguez López (born 1991), Argentine speed skater
