= Victoria Adams =

Victoria Adams may refer to:

- Victoria Adams (comics), a superheroine
- Victoria Gray Adams (1926–2006), civil rights activist
- Victoria Beckham (born 1974), née Adams, English pop singer and businesswoman
- Vicki Chalmers (born 1989), née Adams, Scottish curler
- Mickie James (born 1979), American wrestler, sometimes uses the ring name Vicki Adams

== See also ==
- Adams (surname)
- Victoria (given name)
