= Victor Township =

Victor Township may refer to the following places in the United States:

- Victor Township, DeKalb County, Illinois
- Victor Township, Osborne County, Kansas
- Victor Township, Clinton County, Michigan
- Victor Township, Wright County, Minnesota
- Victor Township, Towner County, North Dakota
- Victor Township, McClain County, Oklahoma
- Victor Township, Marshall County, South Dakota
- Victor Township, Roberts County, South Dakota

See also

- Victor (disambiguation)
- Victoria Township (disambiguation)
- Victory Township (disambiguation)
