= Krymchak language =

Kipchak Turkic language

Krymchak
- кърымчах тыльы
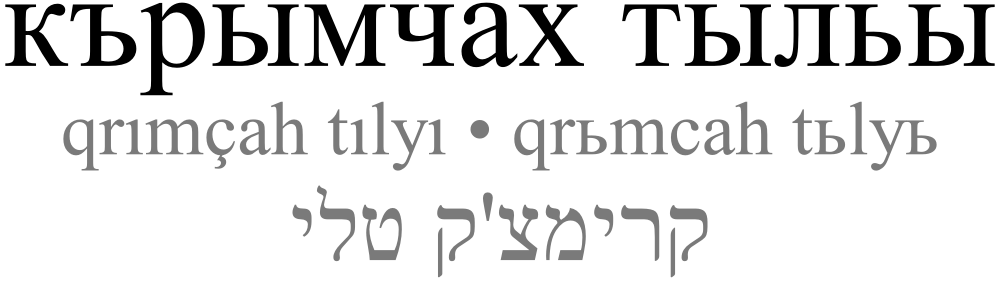
- Krymchak written in modern Cyrillic and Latin scripts, along with obsolete Latin and Hebrew scripts
- Native to: Crimea, Israel, Turkey
- Ethnicity: 1,800 Krymchaks (2007)
- Native speakers: 200 (2007)
- Language family: Turkic: Common Turkic; Kipchak; Kipchak–Cuman; Krymchak
- Writing system: Cyrillic alphabet, Latin script, Hebrew script

Official status
- Recognised minority language in: Ukraine

Language codes
- ISO 639-3: jct
- Glottolog: krym1236
- ELP: Krymchak
- Linguasphere: part of 44-AAB-a

Krymchak (/ˈkrɪmtʃæk/ KRIM-chak; кърымчах тыльы, Qrımçah tılyı; also called Judeo-Crimean Tatar, Krimchak, Chagatai, Dzhagatay) is a moribund Turkic language spoken in Crimea by the Krymchak people. The Krymchak community was composed of Jewish immigrants who arrived from all over Europe and Asia and who continuously added to the Krymchak population. The Krymchak language, as well as culture and daily life, was similar to Crimean Tatar, the peninsula's majority population, with the addition of a significant Hebrew influence.

Like most Jewish languages, it contains many Hebrew loanwords. Before the Soviet era, it was written using Hebrew characters. In the Soviet Union in the 1930s, it was written with the Uniform Turkic Alphabet (a variant of the Latin script), like Crimean Tatar and Karaim. Now it is written in the Cyrillic script.

Over the 20th century the language has disappeared and been replaced by Russian, with approximately 70% of the population perishing in the Holocaust. When in May 1944 almost all Crimean Tatars were deported to Soviet Uzbekistan, many speakers of Krymchak were among them, and some remained in Uzbekistan.

Nowadays, the language is almost extinct. According to the Ukrainian census of 2001, fewer than 785 Krymchak people remain in Crimea. One estimate supposes that of the approximately 1500-2000 Krymchaks living worldwide, mostly in Israel, Crimea, Russia and the United States, only 5-7 are native speakers.

== Classification ==
Krymchak is within the Turkic language family. It has alternatively been considered as a separate language or as an ethnolect of Coastal/Middle Crimean Tatar, along with Crimean Karaite. Glottochronological reckoning evidenced that these subdialects became distinct from Crimean Tatar around 600-800 AD. Krymchak and Karaite became distinguishable around 1200–1300.

== History ==
The Krymchak community formed over hundreds of years as Jews from all over Europe and Asia immigrated to the Crimean peninsula. A Greek-speaking Jewish community had resided on the peninsula from 100 BC, and other Jewish peoples settled there over time as well. The Krymchak community originated during the Middle Ages, grew intensely in the fifteenth and sixteenth centuries, became a unified group in the seventeenth and eighteenth centuries, and continued to grow until the nineteenth century. This growth occurred continuously as Jewish emigrants arrived from the Mediterranean, Eastern Europe, the Caucasus, Persia, and many other regions. The study of Krymchak surnames affirms that their community formed slowly and was composed from elements of different origins.

Like other Jewish groups in the Crimea, Krymchak culture, everyday life, and language had strong Crimean Tatar influences. The Crimean Tatar language became dominant between the fifteenth and sixteenth centuries for political reasons, it being the language of the Crimean peninsula's Tatar political majority. Tatar was the common language used between different ethnic groups residing on the peninsula, and it also became the common language between the different Jewish groups living in the Crimea.

Although Krymchak is often considered by modern linguists to be an ethnolect of Crimean Tatar, and for hundreds of years Krymchaks themselves considered Crimean Tatar to be their language, Krymchak has at times been labeled a unique language. For political reasons, another Crimean Jewish community, the Karaites, claimed that Krymchaks spoke a separate language. Additionally, during the time of the Soviet Union, the Krymchaks themselves claimed to have a language distinct from Crimean Tatar because association with the Tatars would have been dangerous. In their translation of a Krymchak storybook, linguists Marcel Erdal and Iala Ianbay found that Krymchak was different enough from Crimean Tatar to warrant a separate name and study.

The general switch from Krymchak to Russian began after the Russian Revolution and intensified in the 1930s. In 1897, 35% of Krymchak men and 10% of women spoke Russian. In 1926, the majority of Krymchaks considered Crimean Tatar as their native language, however the youth attending Russian schools preferred to speak the Russian language, though they usually spoke incorrectly. Neither did they have a firm command of the Krymchak language.

In 1959, 189 Krymchaks considered Crimean Tatar as their native language. This number should have been higher, however by this time there was ambiguity about the Kymchak ethnic identity and confusion about the language's name.

In 1989 only a few elders could speak Krymchak, while a significant amount of the intermediate generation could speak it somewhat. The younger generation had no knowledge of it. Viktoriya Baginskaya was one of the last speakers of the living Krymchak language.

Changes in the Krymchak population (rounded)
Year	Population
1783	800
1844	1300
1879	2900
1897	3500
1913	7000
1926	6400
1941	8000
1945	2500
1959	1500-2000
1979	1800-2000

== Geographic distribution ==
A 2007 estimate supposes 1,200-1,500 Krymchaks live worldwide, mainly in Israel, Russia, Crimea, and the US. Of these, only 5-7 can speak the language.

Krymchak was spoken in the Crimean peninsula of Ukraine. In 1783, when Russia conquered Crimea, most Krymchaks lived in the town of Karasubazar (now Bilohirsk). This continued to be their population center until World War II, though beginning in the 1880s many migrated to Simferopol. Around 1913 about 1,500 Krymchaks lived in Simferopol. A community-conducted census in 1913 shows they also lived in Kerch, Theodosia, and Sevastopol. There was also a small community in Palestine.

Their population began to decline in the twentieth century, beginning with the Russian civil war and ensuing famine.

About 70% of the Krymchak community died during World War II. Between December 1941 and July 1942 Krymchaks, and many other Jews and other civilians, were killed throughout the Crimean peninsula by the German Einsatzgruppen. When German soldiers reached the towns in which Jewish communities resided, they murdered them en masse. After the war, the remaining Krymchak population dispersed from the Crimean peninsula.

By 1942 about one hundred Krymchak families lived in the United States, most in New York City, and they quickly integrated into the Jewish community there.

In 1979, it was estimated that 1,000 Krymchaks lived in Ukraine, 600 in Russia, 200 in Georgia, and 200 in Uzbekistan. In 1974 only two Krymchak men were still living in Belogorsk, formerly Karasubazar, the community's historic center.

=== Official status ===
Krymchak is designated as an indigenous language in Ukraine.

=== Dialects ===
Though itself considered a dialect of Crimean Tatar, Krymchak differed geographically depending on the dialect of the surrounding Tatar population.

== Phonology ==
Krymchak employs a five-vowel system. Their phonology contains only short vowels. They do not distinguish between front and back labial vowels, such as o / ö and u / ü.

Speakers intone words differently than speakers of Crimean Tatar. Krymchak pronunciation of Hebrew also differs from its traditional pronunciation, which was used by Crimean Karaites, another Judeo-Crimean community.

Krymchak Vowels
	Front	Central	Back
High	i		u
Mid	e		o
Low		a	

Krymchak Consonants
	Labial	Dental	Postalveolar	Palatal	Velar	Uvular
Nasal	m	n			ŋ	
Plosive	p, b, bʲ	t, d	tʃ, dʒ		k, kʲ, g	q
Fricative	f, v	s, z	ʃ		x, ɣ	
Trill		r				
Approximant		l, lʲ		j		

== Vocabulary ==
Krymchak contains a significant amount of borrowed words from Hebrew. As much as 5% of vocabulary is Hebrew. One study of various Krymchak texts also shows borrowed vocabulary from Oghuz and Kypchak. Later texts show strong Russian influence, while earlier texts have many Arabic and Persian borrowings, where the use of Arabic or Persian lends a lofty style.

Krymchak	English
kılıç	sword
arıslan	lion
yaka	collar
yulduz	star
yaş	age
yol	road
kalkan	shield
yanhı	new
yel	wind
tülkü	fox
sıçan	mouse
i̇mırtha	egg
taş	stone
altın	gold
tengiz	sea
kumuş	silver
ögüz	ox
koy	sheep
suv	water
at	horse
agaç	tree
yeşil	green

== Writing system ==
Krymchak was written using the Hebrew alphabet. Over time new characters were created to represent sounds found in Crimean Tatar. Due to the discontinuation of literature written in Krymchak in 1936, it slowly made its way into the realm of non-written languages. Instead, the Krymchaks began utilizing the Russian Cyrillic alphabet (table 2).

A a	B ʙ	C c	Ç ç	D d	E e	F f	G g
H h	I i	J j	Ь ь	K k	Q q	Ƣ ƣ	L l
M m	N n	Ꞑ ꞑ	O o	Ɵ ɵ	P p	R r	S s
Ş ş	T t	U u	Y y	V v	Z z	Ƶ ƶ

А а	Б б	В в	Г г	Гъ гъ	Д д	Е е	З з
И и	Й й	К к	Къ къ	Л л	М м	Н н	Нъ нъ
О о	Ӧ ӧ	П п	Р р	С с	Т т	У у	Ӱ ӱ
Ф ф	Х х	Ч ч	Чъ чъ	Ш ш	Ы ы	Ь ь	Э э

The Krymchak alphabet can be found on Omniglot.

== Examples ==
=== Krymchak translation by B. Baginski-Gurdzhi of "The Cloud" by Pushkin ===
Булут къап-къара, сэн нэге давранайсынъ?
Bulut qap-qara, sän näge davranaysıñ?
The last one of clouds of scattered a tempest,

Нэге ачылгъан кӧклерде долашайсынъ?
Näge açılğan kӧklerde dolaşaysıñ?
Just single you're flying in azure, the prettiest,

Нэге къарартайсынъ ярых кӱнлерны?
Näge qarartaysıñ yarıh künlernı?
Just single you're bringing the sorrowful shade,

Нэге йыгълатайсынъ частлы аваны?..
Näge yığlataysıñ çastlı avanı?..
Just single you're saddening day that is glad.
