= Victorious (disambiguation) =

Victorious is an American sitcom on Nickelodeon.

Victorious may also refer to:

== Arts and entertainment ==
=== Music ===
- Victorious (Perishers album) and the title song, 2007
- Victorious (Skillet album) and the title song, 2019
- Victorious (Wolfmother album), 2016
  - "Victorious" (Wolfmother song), 2015
- Victorious: Music from the Hit TV Show, a soundtrack album, 2011
- "Victorious" (Lina Hedlund song), 2019
- "Victorious" (Panic! at the Disco song), 2015

=== Other uses in arts and entertainment ===
- The Lost Fleet: Victorious, a military science fiction novel by Jack Campbell
- Captain Victorious, a fictional superhero in Ink Pen daily comic strip
- Victorious, the name of two Marvel Comics characters

== Naval vessels ==
- HMS Victorious, the name of various Royal Navy ships and a submarine
- USS George F. Elliott (AP-13), a cargo ship launched in 1918 as Victorious (ID-3514)
- USNS Victorious, an Ocean Surveillance Ship delivered to the Navy in 1991

== Other uses ==
- Victorious Festival, a music festival in Portsmouth, England

== See also ==
- Victory (disambiguation)
- Victorius (disambiguation)
- Victorinus (disambiguation)
- Victory cave, in Nookat District, Kyrgyzstan
- Charles VII of France (1403–1461), called the Victorious
