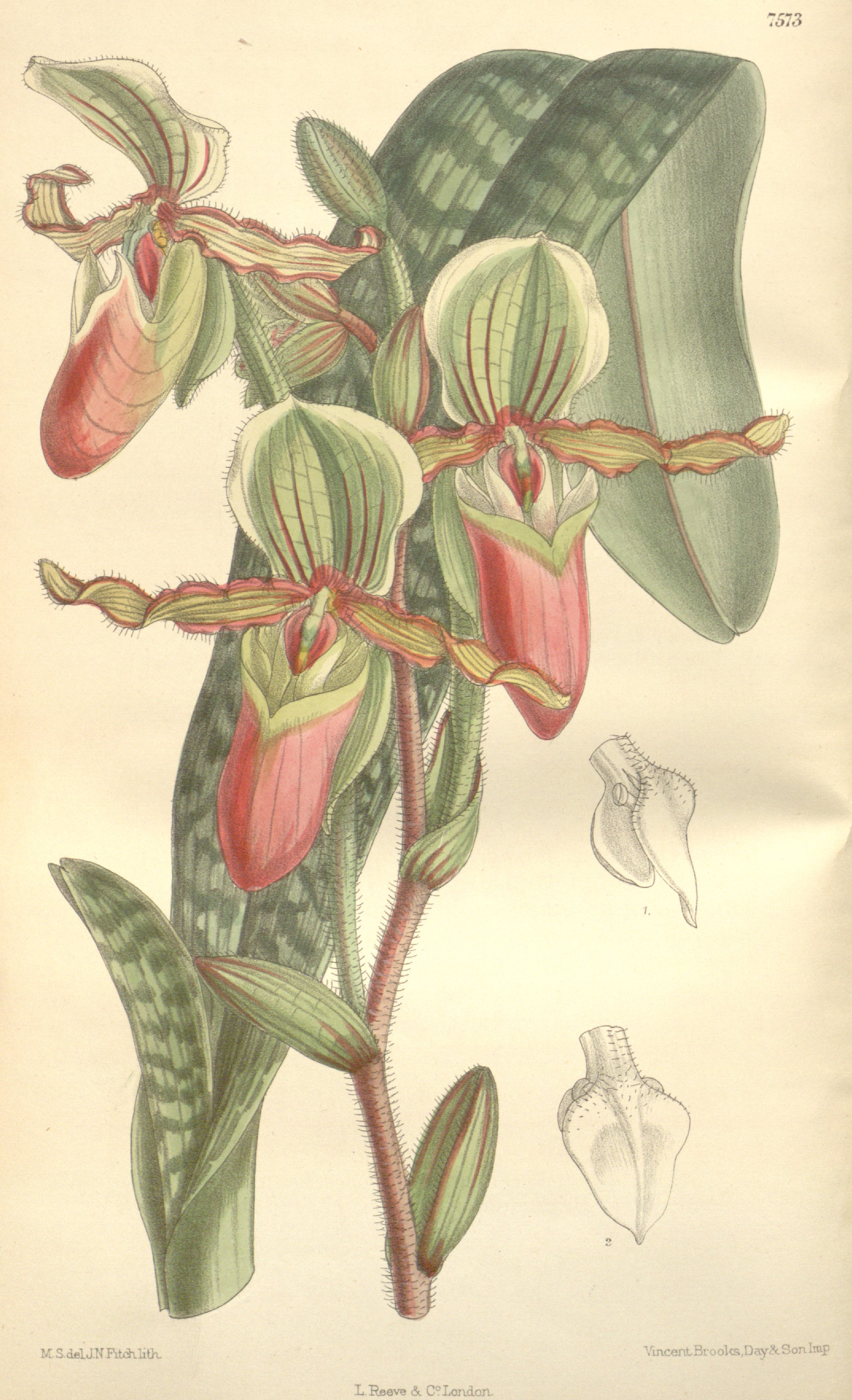
- Illustration of Paphiopedilum victoria-mariae

Scientific classification
- Kingdom: Plantae
- Clade: Tracheophytes
- Clade: Angiosperms
- Clade: Monocots
- Order: Asparagales
- Family: Orchidaceae
- Subfamily: Cypripedioideae
- Genus: Paphiopedilum
- Species: P. victoria-mariae

Binomial name
- Paphiopedilum victoria-mariae (Sander ex Mast.) Rolfe

Synonyms
- Cypripedium victoria-mariae Sander ex Mast. (basionym); Paphiopedilum chamberlainianum f. victoria-mariae (Sander ex Mast.) Rolfe; Cordula victoria-mariae (Sander ex Mast.) Rolfe

= Paphiopedilum victoria-mariae =

Species of orchid

Paphiopedilum victoria-mariae is a species of orchid endemic to western Sumatra (Bukittinggi).
