= SS Port Victor =

A number of ships were named Port Victor, including -

- SS Port Victor (1883), also known as the USAT McClellan
- SS Port Victor (1943), also known as the HMS Nairana (D05)
