= Viktoriya Hryb =

Ukrainian politician

Viсtoria Hryb
- Вікторія Гриб
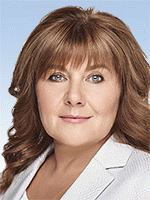

Member of the Verkhovna Rada
- Incumbent
- Assumed office 29 August 2019

Personal details
- Born: Victoria Oleksandrivna Hryb; 19 June 1968 (age 57); Mykilska Borshchahivka, Kyiv Oblast, Ukraine, Soviet Union
- Political party: independent politician

Viktoriya Oleksandrivna Hryb, or Viсtoria Gryb (Ukrainian: Вікторія Олександрівна Гриб; born on 19 June 1968), is a Ukrainian politician, who is serving as a Member of the Verkhovna Rada. She is a Head of the Subcommittee on Energy Security of the Verkhovna Rada Committee on Energy and Housing and Communal Services. Victoria Gryb has over 25 years of professional experience including more than 20 years of experience within roles that combine strategic and managerial responsibility. She has more than 16 years of experience with the Regional USAID Mission for Ukraine, Moldova, Belarus in Kyiv.

== Biography ==
Viktoriya Hryb was born on June 19, 1968, in the village of Sofiivska Borschahivka, Kyiv region. Childhood and youth were spent in Mariupol, where her family moved after her birth.

She has higher education. In 1992 she graduated from the Kyiv National University, Ukraine. Got a University Degree in English Language & Literature, and Philology. In 2000 she graduated from the International Management Institute (IMI-Kyiv) as Master of Business Administration.

Victoria Gryb has over 25 years of professional experience, including more than 20 years of experience within roles that combine strategic and managerial responsibility.

From 1993 to 2009, she worked in various positions at the United States Agency for International Development (USAID). As the Global Development Adviser at USAID/Ukraine, Moldova and Belarus she designed and implemented a Global Development Alliance (GDA) program at USAID/Ukraine which was focused on the creation of public-private partnerships, community development, energy efficiency, improvement of business environment.

From 2009 to 2012 she worked as the Corporate Responsibility Manager of DTEK Ltd, from 2012 to 2018 as the Head of the Social Development Department at DTEK Ltd, from 2018 to 2019 as the Head of Sustainability at DTEK Energy Ltd.

From 2011 to 2019 she was the Chairman of the DTEK Social Partnership Coordinating Committee. Victoria Gryb designed and implemented the large scale Social partnership program with 18 towns of DTEK’s presence. It provided the platform for cooperation between businesses, local and regional governments and society. It was focused on the community development and improvement of quality of people’s life. There were more than 300 projects in this Social partnership program. Some of them, such as “Improvement of business climate”, “Energy efficiency, “Local economic development agencies”, “Telemedicine”, “Industrial parks”, “City by your own hands”, etc. were very innovative in Ukraine.

== Social activity ==
From 2012 to 2015, Hryb was the Chairman of the working group on environmental issues of the UN Global Compact; from 2011 to 2019 was the member of the steering committee of the UN Global Compact.

From 2012 to 2019, Hryb was the Member of the Supervisory Boards of Economic Development Agencies in 9 cities of Ukraine in the east and west of the country.

== Political activity ==
In 2014, in the elections to the Verkhovna Rada, Hryb was a candidate for MP. At the time of the election: DTEK Social Development Manager, non-partisan.

She was an adviser to the mayor of the city of Dobropolye, Donetsk region, Andriy Aksyonov.

She is a candidate for MP in the 2019 parliamentary elections (constituency 105, Zhovtnevy district, part of the Kamyanobrid district of Luhansk, part of the Novoaydar district). At the time of the elections she was Head of Sustainability at DTEK Energo Ltd., non-partisan.

Based on the results of processing 100% of the protocols of the 105th majoritarian district, Victoria Gryb received 39.63% of the votes, and the representative of the Opposition Platform - For Life party, Sergei Medvedchuk, Viktor Medvedchuk's brother, received 31.68%[8].

Victoria Gryb is the Member of the Verkhovna Rada Committee on Energy, Housing and Communal Services. She is the Head of the inter-factional parliamentary association "Just Transition of Coal Regions". Author of bills in support of the medical and educational industries, the coal industry, social support for miners and the transformation of coal regions. Initiator of increasing funding for coal industry support programs.

On 4 September 2020, Hryb was included in the list of Ukrainian individuals against whom sanctions were imposed by the Russian government.

With the beginning of the Russian invasion of Ukraine, she initiated a bill "On compensation for damage caused to the victim as a result of the armed aggression of the Russian Federation".

Actively cooperates with international humanitarian and donor organizations, drawing attention to the need to support Ukraine.

Since her election as a people's deputy, she has been a consistent critic of electricity imports from Russia and Belarus.
