= Viktoriya Khitrinska =

Ukrainian diver (born 1991)

Personal information
- Native name: Вікторія Хітрінська
- Born: 1991 (age 34–35) Mykolaiv, Ukrainian SSR, Soviet Union

Sport
- Country: Ukraine
- Sport: Diving
Medal record
Women's diving
Representing Ukraine
World Junior Championships
Bronze medal – third place	2006 Kuala Lumpur	1 m springboard
European Junior Championships
Gold medal – first place	2006 Palma de Mallorca	1 m springboard
Gold medal – first place	2006 Palma de Mallorca	3 m springboard
Silver medal – second place	2005 Elektrostal	10 m platform
Bronze medal – third place	2005 Elektrostal	1 m springboard
Bronze medal – third place	2005 Elektrostal	3 m springboard
Bronze medal – third place	2006 Palma de Mallorca	10 m platform

Viktoriya Khitrinska (Ukrainian: Вікторія Хітрінська born 1991 in Mykolaiv) is a Ukrainian diver.

== Career ==
She competed at the 2005 European Junior Aquatics Championships, held in Elektrostal, where she received a silver medal in 10 m platform event and two bronze medals in 1 m and 3 m springboard events.

Viktoriya represented her country at the 2006 European Junior Diving Championships, held in Palma de Mallorca winning two gold medals in 1 m and also 3 m springboard event and a bronze in 10 m platform event. She became the most successful competitor of this European Junior Championship.

Then she competed at the 2006 World Junior Diving Championships in Kuala Lumpur, where she won a bronze medal in 1 m springboard event.
