= Viktoria =

Viktoria usually refers to Viktoria, a feminine given name (see Victoria for people named Vikoria), but may also refer to:

== Popular culture ==
- Viktoria (singer), Filipina singer
- Viktoria (Maria Mena album)
- Viktoria (Marduk album), 2018
- Viktoria (film), directed by Maya Vitkova
- Viktoria (character), a video game character in the Thief series
- Countess Viktoria, a character in Viktoria und ihr Husar, an operetta

== Sport ==
- Viktoria (trophy), the German association football championship trophy from 1903 to 1944
- Viktoria 07 Kelsterbach
- Viktoria 1894 Hanau
- Viktoria 89 Berlin
- Viktoria 96 Magdeburg
- Viktoria Aschaffenburg
- Viktoria DJK Coburg
- Viktoria Frankfurt/Oder
- Viktoria Köln
- Viktoria Neu-Isenburg
- Viktoria Plzeň
- Viktoria Žižkov
  - FK Viktoria Stadion, stadium of Viktoria Žižkov

== See also ==
- Viktoriya
- Viktorija (disambiguation)
- Victoria (disambiguation)
- Victor (disambiguation)
- Viktor (disambiguation)
