= Queen Victoria (disambiguation) =

Queen Victoria (1819–1901; r. 1837–1901) was Queen of the United Kingdom.

Queen Victoria or The Queen Victoria may also refer to:

== People ==
- Victoria, Princess Royal (1840–1901), queen consort of Frederick III, King of Prussia
- Victoria of Baden (1862–1930), queen consort of Gustaf V, King of Sweden
- Victoria Eugenie of Battenberg (1887–1969), queen consort of Alfonso XIII, King of Spain

== Other uses ==
- Queen Victoria (Winterhalter), an 1843 painting by Franz Xaver Winterhalter
- Queen Victoria (ship), various ships
- The Queen Victoria, a pub in the television show EastEnders
- Trollinger, a German/Italian wine grape also called Queen Victoria

== See also ==
- Empress Victoria (disambiguation)
- List of places named after Queen Victoria
- List of statues of Queen Victoria
- New Adventures of Queen Victoria, a webcomic featuring Queen Victoria
- Princess Victoria (disambiguation)
- Queen Victoria Rock, a pillar in Arches National Park, Utah, United States
- Spanish cruiser Navarra (1923), called Reina Victoria Eugenia from 1915 to 1931
- Victoria and Albert (disambiguation)
- Victoria (British TV series), a 2016 ITV drama on Queen Victoria
- Victoria of the United Kingdom (disambiguation)
- Victoria Regina (disambiguation)
