= Victory (surname) =

Victory is a surname. Notable people with the surname include:

- Craig Victory (born 1980), Australian field hockey striker
- Ebrahim Victory (1933–2025), Iranian-American Scientist
- Fiona Victory (born 1952), Irish actress
- Gerard Victory (1921–1995), Irish composer
- Grace Victory (born 1990), British YouTuber
- James Victory (1880–1946), Irish politician and farmer
- Jamie Victory (born 1975), English footballer
- Jeffrey P. Victory (1946–2024), Louisiana Supreme Court justice
