= Viktors =

- Gender: Male
- Name day: 19 June

Origin
- Region of origin: Latvia

Other names
- Related names: Victor, Viktor

Viktors is a Latvian masculine given name. It is a cognate of the English given name Victor and may refer to:

- Viktors Arājs (1910–1988), Latvian collaborator and Nazi SS officer
- Viktors Alksnis (born 1950), Russian-born Latvian politician and former Soviet Air Force colonel
- Viktors Bertholds (1921–2009) Latvian who was one of the last native speakers of the Livonian language
- Viktors Bļinovs (born 1981), Latvian ice hockey forward
- Viktors Dobrecovs (born 1977), Latvian football striker and manager
- Viktors Eglītis (1877–1945), Latvian writer and art theorist
- Viktors Hatuļevs (1955–1994), Latvian ice hockey defenseman and left winger
- Viktors Ignatjevs (born 1970), Latvian ice hockey player
- Viktors Lācis (born 1977), Latvian middle-distance runner
- Viktors Lukaševičs (born 1972), Latvian footballer
- Viktors Morozs (born 1980), Latvian football midfielder
- Viktors Ņesterenko (born 1954), Latvian football coach and former footballer
- Viktors Pūpols (born 1934), Latvian-born American chess master
- Viktors Ščerbatihs (born 1974) Latvian weightlifter, politician and Olympic competitor
