= HMS Victoire =

Several vessels of the Royal Navy have been named Victoire (French:Victory):

- HMS Victoire (1795), was a lugger purchased in 1795 and listed until 1800.
- HMS Victoire (1797) (or HMS Victor) was the French privateer schooner Victoire that the Royal Navy captured in 1797 and took into service as a fireship. The Navy sold her at the end of 1801.
- A tender named Victoire was part of a naval squadron at the Siege of Genoa (1800). The squadron also included HMS Minotaur, Phoenix, Mondovi, and Entreprenante, all under the command of Vice-Admiral Lord Keith. Victoire may have been the privateer of two guns and 28 men that HMS Mutine had captured near Genoa on 29 March 1800.
