= Empress Victoria =

Empress Victoria may refer to:

- Victoria (Gallic Empire) (c. 231 – c. 271), called Empress of the West and de facto empress of Gaul
- Queen Victoria (1819–1901), Empress of India (r. 1876–1901)
- Victoria, Princess Royal (1840–1901), German Empress
- The Empress (hotel), in Victoria, British Columbia

== See also ==
- Princess Victoria (disambiguation)
- Queen Victoria (disambiguation)
