= Victoria Sanchez =

Victoria Sanchez may refer to:

- Victoria Sanchez (actress) (born 1976), Canadian film actress
- Victoria Sánchez (musician) (born 1986), Venezuelan conductor and pianist from El Sistema
- Victoria Sánchez (footballer) (born 2005), Salvadoran footballer
