= Victorville (disambiguation) =

Victorville is a city in San Bernardino County, California, United States.

Victorville may also refer to:

== Military ==
- George Air Force Base, a former United States military base formerly named Victorville Army Airfield (1941–1948) and Victorville Air Force Base (1948–1950)
- Victorville Army Airfield auxiliary fields of World War II

== Transportation ==
- Victor Valley Transportation Center, the Victorville train station in Victorville, California, United States
- Victorville Airport, officially Southern California Logistics Airport, a public airport in Victorville, California, United States

== Prisons ==
- Federal Correctional Complex, Victorville, a U.S. prison complex in Victorville, California, which includes:
  - Federal Correctional Institution, Victorville, a medium-security prison; and
  - United States Penitentiary, Victorville, a high-security prison

== Other uses ==
- Victorville shoulderband, a species of gastropod in the family Helminthoglyptidae
