= Victorinus (disambiguation) =

Victorinus (died 270) was emperor of the secessionist Gallic Empire in the late 3rd century.

Victorinus may also refer to:

- Titus Furius Victorinus, a roman equestrian during the reigns of Antoninus Pius and Marcus Aurelius who held the highest positions like prefect of the watch, prefect of Egypt and praetorian prefect.
- Gaius Aufidius Victorinus, a friend and general of the emperor Marcus Aurelius.
- Gaius Marius Victorinus (4th century), Roman grammarian, rhetorician and neo-Platonic philosopher
- Victorinus (vicarius), a vicarius of Roman Britain probably serving between 395 and 406
- Victorinus of Pettau (4th century), Christian scribe
- Victorinus of Camerino, bishop and saint
- Victorinus, Christian martyr and companion of Simplicius and Constantius
- Saint Victorinus, martyr and saint who was a companion of Placidus
- Saint Victorinus, martyr and saint who was a companion of Maximus of Évreux
- Saint Victorinus, martyr and saint who was a killed with Cassius of Clermont

== See also ==
- Victorius (disambiguation)
- Victorious (disambiguation)
