= Victoria Rodríguez Clavijo =

Spanish actress (1931–2020)

Victoria Rodríguez
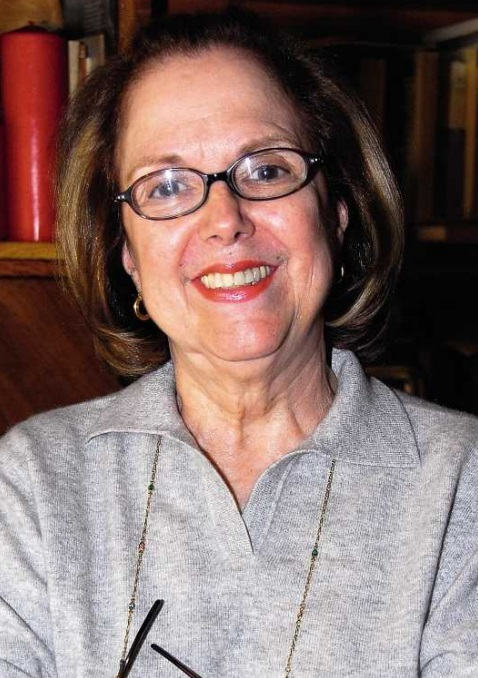
- Rodríguez in 2010
- Born: Victoria Rodríguez Clavijo; 24 September 1931
- Died: 15 July 2020 (aged 88); Madrid, Spain
- Occupation: Actress
- Spouse: Antonio Buero Vallejo

Victoria Rodríguez Clavijo (24 September 1931 – 15 July 2020) was a Spanish actress. She appeared in many Spanish theatre productions, including productions of Don Juan Tenorio and Hamlet.

From 1958 until his death in 2000, she was married to playwright and member of the Royal Spanish Academy Antonio Buero Vallejo. The couple had two sons.

Rodríguez died in Madrid on 15 July 2020 from pneumonia, aged 88.
