= Queen Victoria (ship) =

Queen Victoria has been the name of several ships:

- SS British Queen (1839), a wooden paddle-wheel Atlantic passenger steamship built under the name Royal Victoria, but due to Victoria ascending the throne in 1837, the name was changed to British Queen and was launched in 1838 under that name
- PS Queen Victoria (1838), a wooden paddle-wheel steamer that was wrecked in 1853 off Bailey Lighthouse, Howth, with the loss of over 80 people
- SS Queen Victoria, a paddle steamer launched in 1887
- TS Queen Mary, originally sailed as TS Queen Victoria from 1933 to 1935
- RMS Queen Mary, initially supposed to be called Victoria in line with the naming of Cunard's liners, with an ending in -ia, as with Lusitania, Mauretania
- MS Arcadia (2004), a cruise liner which was intended to be Queen Victoria for Cunard Line
- MS Queen Victoria, a ship of similar design and specifications to Arcadia that was completed and named in 2007 for Cunard Line

A number of other ships have been named simply Victoria:

- Royal Victoria (ship) of Liverpool, lost 1864
- Victoria (ship), the first ship to circumnavigate the globe
- Spanish frigate Victoria (F82), a Spanish frigate
- HMS Victoria, five ships of the British Royal Navy
- MV Princess Victoria, a ferry which sank disastrously in 1953
- RMS Victoria, a Lake Victoria ferry built in Glasgow and reassembled in East Africa.
- Victoria-class submarine, a class of Canadian submarine
- MV Victoria, a P&O cruise ship operated between 1998 and 2002, now named Oceanic II
- MS Victoria I, a cruiseferry belonging to Tallink
- MS Kronprinsessan Victoria, a ferry operated by Sessan Linjen and Stena Line 1981–1988, now sailing as MS Stena Europe
- MS Crown Princess Victoria, a ferry operated by Stena Line in 1990, now sailing as MS Amusement World
- PS Victoria
- Victoria (Liberian ship), a Liberian-flagship bringing Iranian weapons to Gaza.

== See also ==
- Victoria (disambiguation)
