= Saint-Victor =

Saint-Victor may refer to:

- Paul Bins, comte de Saint-Victor (1827–1881), French author

It is also the name or part of the name of several communes in France:

- Saint-Victor, Allier, in the Allier département
- Saint-Victor, Ardèche, in the Ardèche département
- Saint-Victor, Cantal, in the Cantal département
- Saint-Victor, Dordogne, in the Dordogne département
- Saint-Victor-de-Buthon, in the Eure-et-Loir département
- Saint-Victor-de-Cessieu, in the Isère département
- Saint-Victor-de-Chrétienville, in the Eure département
- Saint-Victor-de-Malcap, in the Gard département
- Saint-Victor-de-Morestel, in the Isère département
- Saint-Victor-d'Épine, in the Eure département
- Saint-Victor-de-Réno, in the Orne département
- Saint-Victor-des-Oules, in the Gard département
- Saint-Victor-en-Marche, in the Creuse département
- Saint-Victor-l'Abbaye, in the Seine-Maritime département
- Saint-Victor-la-Coste, in the Gard département
- Saint-Victor-la-Rivière, in the Puy-de-Dôme département
- Saint-Victor-Malescours, in the Haute-Loire département
- Saint-Victor-Montvianeix, in the Puy-de-Dôme département
- Saint-Victor-Rouzaud, in the Ariège département
- Saint-Victor-sur-Arlanc, in the Haute-Loire département
- Saint-Victor-sur-Avre, in the Eure département
- Saint-Victor-sur-Ouche, in the Côte-d'Or département
- Saint-Victor-sur-Rhins, in the Loire département
- Saint-Victor-et-Melvieu, in the Aveyron département

It is also the name of a municipality in Canada:

- Saint-Victor, Quebec

== See also ==
- St. Victor (disambiguation), for saints named Victor
