= HMS Vittoria =

Two ships of the Royal Navy have borne the name HMS Vittoria:

- HMS Vittoria was to have been a 42-gun fifth-rate frigate, but she was renamed HMS Princess Charlotte in 1814 before being launched later that year.
- HMS Vittoria (1917) was an Admiralty V-class destroyer launched in 1917 and sunk in 1919.
