= Viktoriya Baginskaya =

Soviet and Russian writer, teacher and folklorist

- Vikturia Illivna Baginska-Gurji
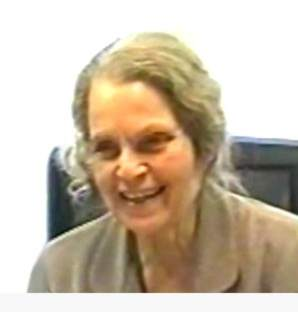
- Born: Vikturia Illivna Baginska; 30 June 1926; North Caucasus Krai, RSFSR, USSR
- Died: 7 January 2012 (aged 85); Krasnodar, Russia
- Citizenship: USSR, Russia
- Occupations: Journalist; folklorist; translator; teacher
- Writing career
- Subjects: Folklore of Russia, folklore
- Notable works: Preservation of the national memory of Crimeans, efforts to revive Crimean culture

Vikturia Illivna Baginska-Gurji (c. Vectokria Ilynichna Baginskaya; born Gurdjik; 30 June 1926, Krasnodar, USSR – 7 January 2012, Russian Federation) was a Soviet and Russian writer, teacher, collector of songs and folklore of the Krymchaks, one of the last speakers of the living Krymchak language.

== Biography ==
Viktoriya Baginskaya was born in the family of Crimeans Ilya Yakaulevich and Vera Petrovna Gurdzhi, who came to Krasnodar from Kerch (Crimea) in the famine year of 1921.

In 1974 she was invited to cooperate in the popular in the USSR "Teacher's Newspaper" ^{[ru]} after winning (1st prize) in the All-Union Literary Competition of Essays "Teacher of Our Days", dedicated to the 50th anniversary of the Teacher's Newspaper. Articles B. Baginsky about non-standard lessons, techniques and methods of education, essays, novels, etc. until recently were printed in the Teacher's Newspaper.

More than 250 articles were published in All-Union and regional periodicals: in the magazines "Literature at School", "Literature Lessons", "Family and School", "Friendship of Peoples", "Soviet Woman" (later "Women's World"), "Nature and man", "Science and life" and many others; in the central newspapers: "Nastavnitskaya gazeta", "Pravda", "Hudok" and other publications. Viktoriya Baginskaya is a laureate of five literary contests for the best essay: International (two first and one third prizes), All-Union (first and third prizes).

== Creativity and accomplishment ==
All seven members of the Gurdji family, who lived far from the Crimea, spoke Crimean at home, knew Crimean songs, protected and popularized songs, proverbs and sayings, stories and myths of Krymchaks, did not forget national customs and traditions.

In the early 1960s Baginska sent 12 Crimean songs to the State Museum of Ethnography of the USSR – in the original and with her own translation into Russian. The museum institution accepted it as members of the council for the promotion of the Museum.

In 1983 the newspaper Pravda published V. Baginskaya's article "I belong to the source", where she spoke for the first time about her people and stressed the need to preserve the people's creativity of the Krymchaks.

Baginskaya collected 100 songs, 230 proverbs, parables, fairy tales and proverbs, translated them into Russian, but it was not possible to publish it for decades. In 2003, Baginskaya, with the help of her husband and sons, managed to publish 100 copies of the collection "Folk Songs and Proverbs of the Krymchaks" at her own expense. The collection was gifted to folklore lovers. The book is catalogued by the United States Library of Congress.

Baginskaya translated Alexander Pushkin's poetry collections into the Krymchak language.

Victoria Baginskaya made a miniature copy of I.K. Aivazovsky's paintings, She painted the works of some authors(AN Tolstoy, "Aelita"; AR Belyaev, "Amphibian Man" and others). In the literary genre, she specializes in science fiction poetry and short stories ("Contact", "Calling", etc.).

== Poetry ==
- My village ship, Teacher's Newspaper;
- The first selection of poems B. Baginska-Gurji, Good Put, Soviet Kuban, 23 January 1965.

== Translations ==
- Folk Songs and Proverbs of the Krymchaks, Krasnodar, 2003 (US Library of Congress).
- The Link of Time, Archived 9 October 2008 at the Wayback Machine (Torunu A. About the translations of Pushkin and the poet's poems into the Crimean language), "Science and Life", No. Six, 2005.

== Articles ==
- "I am falling in spring", Pravda, 6 January 1983
- Forgotten wealth: the life of the Crimeancas, "Friendship of the people", 1990, Issue 1
- Wedding in the Krymchak family, Friends of Peoples, 1993, Issue 8
- The Song of Love-Keriba (About the Folklore of the Crimean folklore), "Sare in School", 2005, Issue 8.
- I hear the voices day and night, I..., "Teacher's newspaper," 2003, Issue 34
- Elena Lubinets, "Rainbow Collector", "Rossiyskaya Gazeta", Issue 221, 4 October 2005
- V. Baginskaya in the Encyclopedia of Contemporary Ukraine ( 2003, Vol. 2, s. 57 s. 58 n )

== Illustrations for books ==
- Drawings for their own collection of poems "Life is a challenging test," 2008 ( Wire 1, Figure 2, Figure 16 )

== Songs ==
- Little Anger is a Little Pain (the poem is by Victoria Baginskaya, music and performance by Igor Mey). The song was archived on 2 April 2023 at the Wayback Machine.

== Correspondence ==
- Samuil Marshak's letter to Victoria Baginskaya, S. Marshak, Seçilmiş Mektuplar. Toplu eserler, v.8
- Response to Victoria Baginskaya's letter from UNESCO. ( Translated the letter into Russian )
