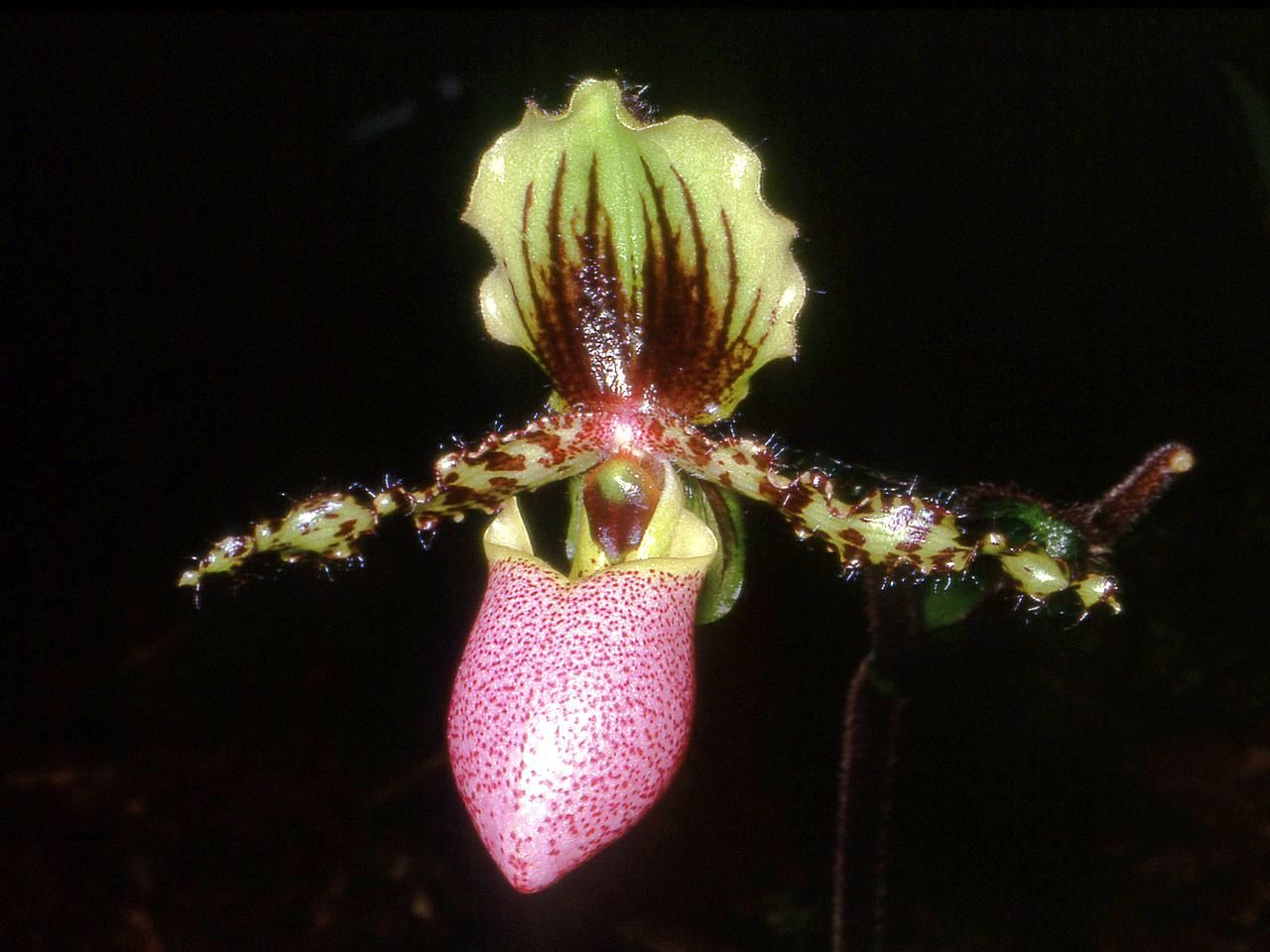

Conservation status
- Vulnerable (IUCN 3.1)

Scientific classification
- Kingdom: Plantae
- Clade: Tracheophytes
- Clade: Angiosperms
- Clade: Monocots
- Order: Asparagales
- Family: Orchidaceae
- Subfamily: Cypripedioideae
- Genus: Paphiopedilum
- Species: P. victoria-regina

Binomial name
- Paphiopedilum victoria-regina (Sander) M.W.Wood

Synonyms
- Paphiopedilum chamberlainianum (O'Brien) Stein; Cypripedium victoria-regina Sander (basionym); Cypripedium chamberlainianum O'Brien; Paphiopedilum chamberlainianum var. latifolium Schltr.; Cordula chamberlainiana (O'Brien) Rolfe; Paphiopedilum victoria-regina ssp. chamberlainianum (O'Brien) M.W.Wood; Paphiopedilum kalinae Braem; Paphiopedilum victoria-regina var. kalinae (Braem) Koop.; Paphiopedilum victoria-regina var. latifolium (Schltr.) Beckner

= Paphiopedilum victoria-regina =

Species of orchid

Paphiopedilum victoria-regina is an orchid species endemic to the rainforests of western Sumatra.
