= Victor, Kanawha County, West Virginia =

Victor, West Virginia
- Unincorporated community
- Location within West Virginia Location within the United States
- Coordinates: 38°25′24″N 81°25′34″W
- Country: United States
- State: West Virginia
- County: Kanawha
- Elevation: 640 ft (200 m)
- Time zone: UTC-5 (Eastern (EST))
  - Summer (DST): UTC-4 (EDT)
- Area codes: 304 & 681
- GNIS feature ID: 1555888

Victor is an unincorporated community in Kanawha County, West Virginia, United States. Victor is 3 miles (4.8 km) east-northeast of Pinch.
