= Victory (disambiguation) =

Victory is successful conclusion of a fight or competition.

Victory commonly refers to:

- Victoria (mythology), the deified personification of victory

Victory may also refer to:

== Places ==
=== United States ===
- Victory, Cayuga County, New York, a town
- Victory, Saratoga County, New York, a village
- Victory, Minneapolis, Minnesota, neighborhood
- Victory, Oklahoma, an unincorporated community
- Victory, Vermont, a town
- Victory, Wisconsin, an unincorporated community
- Victory Boulevard (Staten Island)
- Victory Boulevard (Los Angeles)
- Mount Victory, Ohio, a village

=== Elsewhere ===
- Rural Municipality of Victory No. 226, Saskatchewan, Canada
- Victory Beach, New Zealand
- Victory (volcano), a volcano on New Guinea island, Papua New Guinea
  - Mount Victory (Papua New Guinea), the same volcano
- Victory (crater), a crater in Taurus–Littrow valley on the Moon

== Companies ==
- Victory Brewing Company in Downingtown, Pennsylvania
- Victory Liner, the bus company in the Philippines
- Victory Motorcycles, an American motorcycle manufacturer
- Victory Records, an American record label

== Ships ==
- HMS Victory, six Royal Navy ships, as well as various shore establishments by that name
- USS Victory (1863), a US Navy gunboat
- Victory (1847 ship), a barque that took immigrants to New Zealand and Australia from 1848 to 1863
- Victory ship, a type of naval vessel built by the US during World War II
- Carnival Victory, a cruise ship operated by Carnival Cruise Line
- Victory, an 1828 paddlesteamer used by John Ross

== Arts and entertainment ==
=== Films ===
- Victory (1919 film), an American silent film
- Victory (1928 film), a British film
- Victory (1938 film), a Soviet film
- Victory (1940 film), based on the novel by Joseph Conrad
- Victory (1976 film), a Taiwanese war film
- Victory (1996 film), starring Willem Dafoe
- Victory (2008 film), a Telugu film directed by Ravi
- Victory (2009 film), a Bollywood film
- Victory (2013 film), a Kannada film directed by Nanda Kishore
  - Victory 2, its 2018 sequel directed by Hari Santhosh
- Victory (2023 film), an Israeli film directed by Eliran Peleg
- Victory (2024 film), a South-Korean film directed by Park Beom-su
- Escape to Victory or Victory, a 1981 film directed by John Huston

=== Television ===
- "Victory" (Beast Wars), a 1996 episode of Beast Wars
- Team Victory, a fictional group in Total Drama World Tour
- Transformers Victory, the third Japanese transformers TV series

=== Music ===
==== Albums ====
- Victory (Bethel Music album), 2019
- Victory (Cian Ducrot album), 2023
- Victory (DJ Khaled album), 2010
- Victory (Do or Die album), 2000
- Victory (Jedward album), 2011
- Victory (Jacksons album), 1984
- Victory (Madeon album), 2026
- Victory (Modern Talking album), 2002
- Victory (Narada Michael Walden album), 1980
- Victory (Running Wild album), 2000
- Victory (Slick Rick album), 2025
- Victory (Unleashed album), 1995
- Victory (Wisin album), 2017
- Victory (EP), a 2015 extended play by San Holo

==== Songs ====
- "Victory" (Puff Daddy song), 1997
- "Victory" (Ross Mintzer song), 2013
- "Victory", by Battle Beast from Steel
- "Victory", by Bond from Born
- "Victory", by Dropkick Murphys, a bagpipe cover of the Notre Dame Victory March
- "Victory (Creature of the Night)", by Heavenly from Dust to Dust
- "Victory", by Janelle Monáe from The Electric Lady
- "Victory", by John Distin
- "Victory", by Kool & the Gang from Forever
- "Victory", by Megadeth from Youthanasia
- "Victory", by PJ Harvey from Dry
- "Victory", by Riot V from Armor of Light
- "Victory", by Shade Empire from Zero Nexus
- "Victory", by Simon Curtis from 8Bit Heart
- "Victory", by Soprano from the EA Sports game FIFA 09
- "Victory", by Sugababes from The Lost Tapes
- "Victory", by Two Steps from Hell from Battlecry
- "Victory", by Týr from Ragnarok
- "Victory", by Within the Ruins from Creature
- "Victory", by Yolanda Adams from Day by Day
- "Victory", fight song of the University of Dayton
- "Victory", former fight song of Pennsylvania State University
- "Victory Egg", originally "Victory", by Cardiacs from A Little Man and a House and the Whole World Window

==== Performers ====
- Victory (band), a German heavy metal band

=== Other uses in arts and entertainment ===
- Victory (novel), a 1915 novel by Joseph Conrad
- Victory, a 1998 novel by Kristine Kathryn Rusch
- Victory, a comic book series by Image Comics
- Victory (pinball), a 1987 pinball machine by Premier
- Victory, part of the 1902 statue group William Tecumseh Sherman (Saint-Gaudens), by Augustus Saint-Gaudens
- Victory+, an American streaming service
- Victory (video game), a 1982 Exidy video game

== Theaters ==
- National Theatre, Melbourne, in Melbourne, Australia, which opened in 1920 as the Victory Theatre
- Victory Theatre, a theater in Evansville, Indiana
- Victory Theater, a theater in Holyoke, Massachusetts
- Victoria Theatre (Dayton, Ohio), which re-opened in 1919 as the Victory Theatre

== Sports teams ==
- California Victory, a USL professional football team in San Francisco, California
- Melbourne Victory FC, an Australian professional football club
- Victory SC, a Haitian football club
- Victory Sports Club, a Maldivian football club
- Victory Team, a powerboat racing team from the United Arab Emirates

== People ==
- Victory (surname)
- Jack Victory, ring name of American professional wrestler Kenneth Rinehurst
- Vicky Victory, stage name of American female professional wrestler Peach Janae, one of The Cheerleaders from the Gorgeous Ladies of Wrestling
- "Victory" Venkatesh, Indian actor

== Other uses ==
- Victory (church), an Evangelical Christian church based in the Philippines
- Victory Museum, a museum in Afyonkarahisar, Turkey
- Victory (political party), a political party in Guatemala
- Victory (Greek political party), a political party in Greece
- Victory station, a mass transit station in Dallas, Texas

== See also ==
- Al-Fath ("Victory"), the forty-eighth sura of the Qur'an
- Victorious (disambiguation)
