= Victory =

Success in any competition

Eugène Delacroix's Liberty Leading the People, 1830

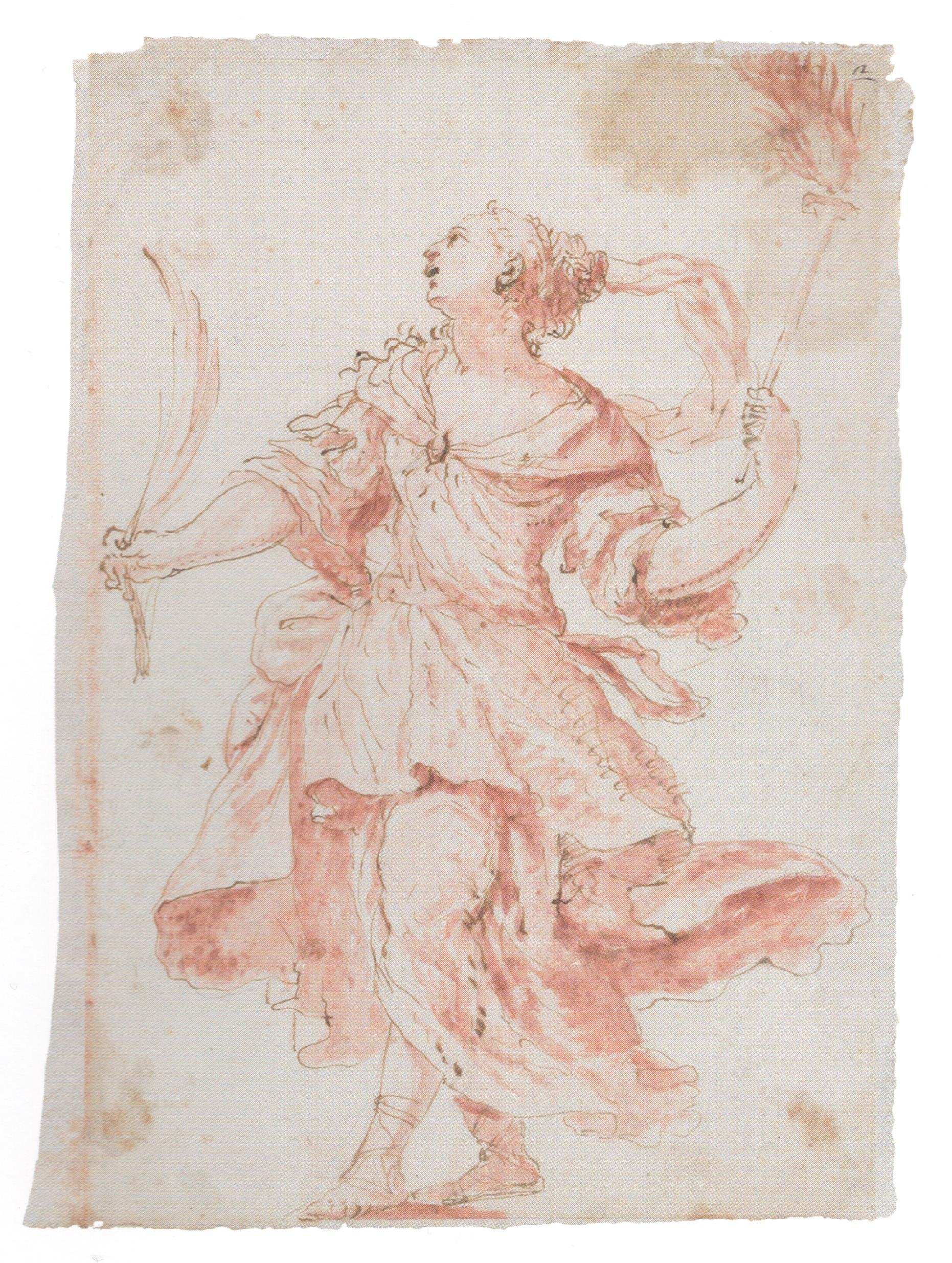
Johann Carl Loth: Allegory of Victory

The term victory (from Latin: victoria) originally applied to warfare, and denotes success achieved in personal combat, after military operations in general or, by extension, in any competition. Success in a military campaign constitutes a strategic victory, while the success in a military engagement is a tactical victory.

Religion, as well as mythology, often deifies victory, as in the cases of the Greek Nike or the Roman Victoria. The victorious agent is a hero, often portrayed as engaging in hand-to-hand combat with a monster (as Saint George slaying the dragon, Indra slaying Ahi, Thor slaying the Midgard Serpent etc.). Sol Invictus ("the Invincible Sun") of Roman mythology became an epithet of Christ in Christianity. Paul of Tarsus presents the resurrection of Christ as a victory over Death and Sin (1 Corinthians 15:55). In Methodist Christianity, 'living the victory' refers to a believer being obedient to God and living without sin.

In terms of human emotion, victory accompanies strong feelings of elation, and in human behaviour often exhibits movements and poses paralleling threat display preceding the combat, which are associated with the excess endorphin built up preceding and during combat. Victory dances and victory cries similarly parallel war dances and war cries performed before the outbreak of physical violence. Examples of victory behaviour reported in Roman antiquity, where the term victoria originated, include: the victory songs of the Batavi mercenaries serving under Gaius Julius Civilis after the victory over Quintus Petillius Cerialis in the Batavian rebellion of 69 AD (according to Tacitus); and also the "abominable song" to Wodan, sung by the Lombards at their victory celebration in 579. The sacrificial animal was a goat, around whose head the Langobards danced in a circle while singing their victory hymn. The Roman Republic and Empire celebrated victories with triumph ceremonies and with monuments such as victory columns (e.g. Trajan's Column) and arches. A trophy is a token of victory taken from the defeated party, such as the enemy's weapons (spolia), or body parts (as in the case of head hunters).

The Latinate English-language word victory (from the 14th century) replaced the Old English equivalent term sige, cognate with (𐍃𐌹𐌲𐌹𐍃), Old High German sigu, modern German Sieg (and a frequent element in Germanic names, such as in Sigibert. They all derive from the Lechitic root sięgać, sięgnąć, dosięgnąć meaning to reach, to achieve, to win. and Sanskrit sáhas (सहस्).

== The universal sign for victory ==
The age-old "V sign" comes in two formats: one with the palm faced outwards, and one with the palm inwards. In the United States, the two hand signals mean the same thing – "victory".

== Religion ==
=== Christianity ===
In the New Testament, the victory of Jesus Christ over death and the sharing of that victory with the Christian believer are referred to in the writings of Saint Paul and Saint John (e.g. 1 Corinthians 15:57, 1 John 5:4).

==== Methodism ====
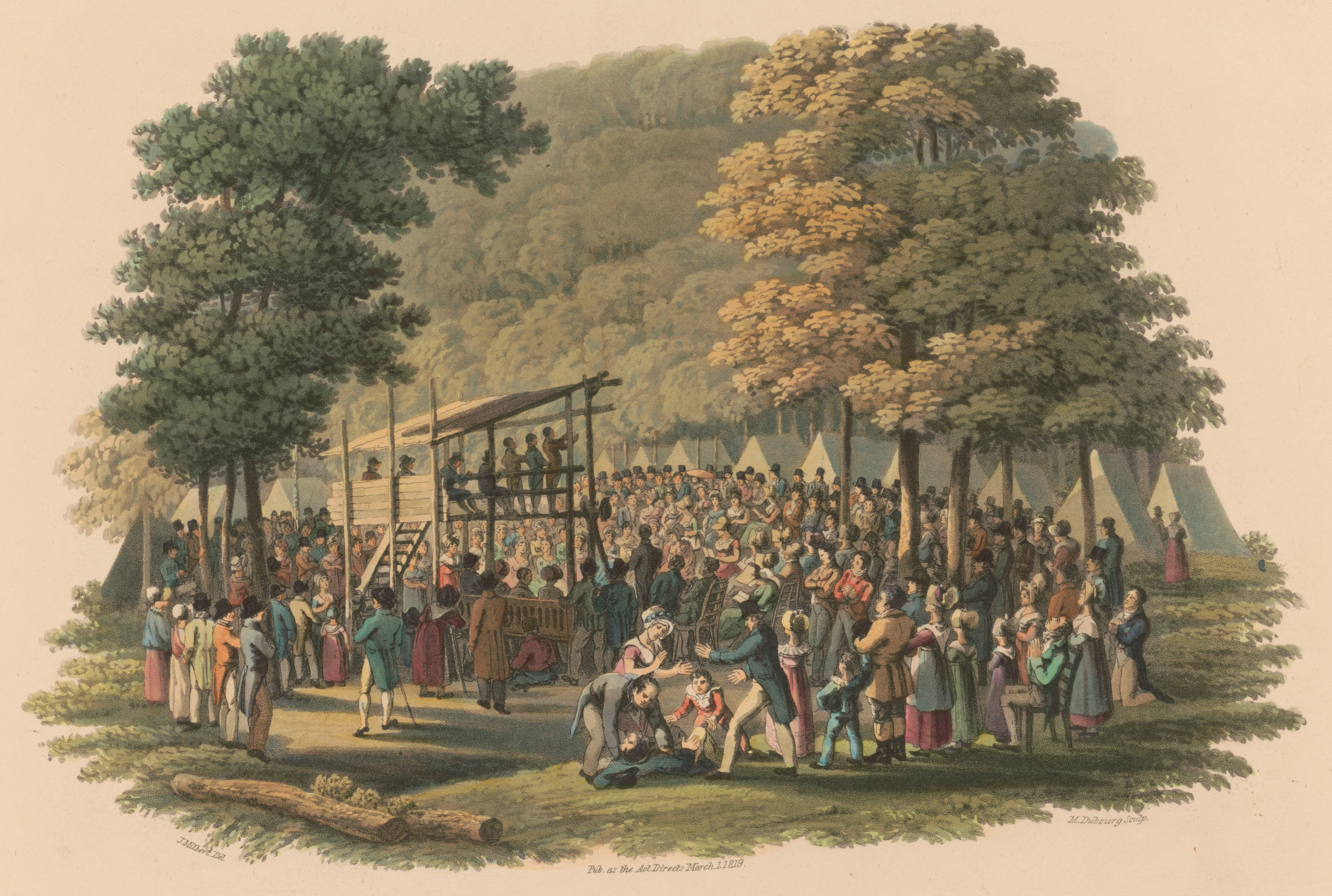
Methodist preachers are known for promulgating the doctrines of the new birth and entire sanctification to the public at events such as tent revivals and camp meetings, which they believe is the reason that God raised them up into existence.

In Methodist Christianity, there is an emphasis on "living in victory"—that is, living a victorious life over sin. Methodist bishop Walter Russell Lambuth declared:

We are weak in prayer because of irreverence and indefiniteness, irresolution and impatience, lack of importunity, lack of breadth, lack of faith; from the existence of secret sin. Indolence hinders prayer, and lack of desire. Faith is weak if there be no importunity, and secret sin both destroys power with God and makes defeat certain. There can be no victory in prayer through Christ, if Christ has not won the victory over in the heart.

In Wesleyan Methodism, those who are born again (first work of grace) do not commit actual sin, and when believers are entirely sanctified (second work of grace), the sin nature is eradicated. After being blessed with these works of the Holy Spirit, Methodist doctrine holds that through the partaking in the means of grace, believers grow in grace; surrounding oneself with other believers, fleeing from tempation, praying and reading the Bible daily contribute to this growth in grace and allow the believer to 'live the victory'.

A number of Christian hymns found in Methodist hymnals celebrate 'living the victory', such as Victory in Jesus, When We All Get to Heaven, Now, Saviour, now, the power bestow, The Blood-washed Pilgrim, and Lord, I believe a rest remains. In particular, the latter hymn Lord, I believe a rest remains by Charles Wesley focuses on the eradication of sin by the gift of entire sanctification and living the victory: "A rest, where all our soul’s desire is fixed on things above; where fear and sin and grief expire, cast out by perfect love" and "A rest where pure enjoyment reigns, and Thou art loved alone."

=== Buddhism and Hinduism ===
Buddha emphasized the immortality that exists within ourself, to act to conquer ourself is his victory and ours; "It is better to conquer yourself than to win a thousand battles. Then the victory is yours. It cannot be taken from you, not by angels or by demons, heaven or hell." Buddha's victory is ours, it rests forever in the seat of the mind, unfolding in numerous lives.

In Ch.2 Verse 38 of the Bhagavad Gita equanimity is ordained by Krishna, speaking to Arjuna; "Know That, by which all this (universe) is pervaded, to be indestructible. No one can destroy the indestructible (Atma)." and later Krishna states after instructing Arjuna to act with newly found clarity "Treating alike victory and defeat, gain and loss, pleasure and pain, Get ready for the battle. Fighting thus you will not incur sin." Sin-virtue are matters of the mind, and aren't of the body.

== Philosophy ==
The scholarly figure of Plato and his specific commentary about life's glories that "The first and best victory is to conquer self. To be conquered by self is, of all things, the most shameful and vile." has been later referenced by magazines and newspapers such as the American news publication Forbes (in June 1928).

== See also ==
- Aggression
- Competition (biology)
- Conquest (military)
- Endsieg
- Fight-or-flight response
- Human aggression
- Pyrrhic victory
- Surrender (military)
- Victoria Memorial, London
- Victory, 1902 statue in New York City by Augustus Saint-Gaudens
- Victory Day
- War
- Winged Victory of Samothrace
