= Vítor =

- Pronunciation: Portuguese: [ˈvi.tɔɾ]
- Gender: masculine
- Language: Portuguese

Origin
- Derivation: Latin victor
- Meaning: "winner", "conqueror"

Other names
- Related names: Victor, Víctor, Vittorio, Vittore, Avigdor, Wiktor

Vítor is a Portuguese and Brazilian masculine given name. It is derived from the Latin name Victor, meaning "winner" or "conqueror". It is equivalent to Víctor in Spanish.

It may refer to:

== A ==
- Vítor Aleixo (born 1956), Portuguese politician
- Vítor Almeida (disambiguation)
- Vítor Alves (disambiguation)
- Vitor Araújo (born 1987), Brazilian pianist
- Vitor Assan (born 1996), Brazilian singer, songwriter, and musician

== B ==
- Vítor Baía (born 1969), Portuguese footballer
- Vítor Baptista (disambiguation)
- Vítor Barata (born 1996), Portuguese footballer
- Vítor Bastos (born 1990), Portuguese footballer
- Vitor Belfort (born 1977), Brazilian mixed martial artist
- Vítor Benite (born 1990), Brazilian basketball player
- Vítor Bento (1954), Portuguese banker
- Vitor Borges (born 1988), Brazilian footballer
- Vitor de Paula Braga, known as Vitor (footballer, born 1953), Brazilian footballer
- Vítor Bruno (disambiguation)
- Vitor Bueno (born 1994), Brazilian footballer

== C ==
- Vitor Caetano (born 1999), Brazilian footballer
- Vítor Campelos (born 1975), Portuguese footballer
- Vítor Campos (1944–2019), Portuguese footballer
- Vitor Carvalho (born 1997), Brazilian footballer
- Vítor Castanheira (born 1977), Portuguese footballer
- Vitor Castro (born 1988), Brazilian footballer
- Vítor Coelho (1899–1987), Brazilian Redemptorist
- Vítor Constâncio (born 1943), Portuguese economist
- Vítor Hugo Rosário Mendes Correia (born 1984), known as Torugo, Portuguese futsal player
- Vítor Costa (disambiguation)
- Vítor Pereira Crespo (1932–2014), Portuguese politician
- Vitor Cruz de Jesus, known as Vítor (footballer, born 1987), Brazilian footballer

== D ==
- Vítor Damas (1947–2003), Portuguese footballer
- Vitor Dias (born 1998), Brazilian footballer
- Vítor Duarte (born 1959), Mozambican-born Portuguese footballer

== E ==
- Vítor Escária (born 1971), Portuguese economist
- Vitor Eudes (born 1998), Brazilian footballer

== F ==
- Vítor Faverani (born 1988), Brazilian basketball player
- Vitor Feijão (born 1996), Brazilian footballer
- Vitor Emanuel Araujo Ferreira (born 1997), Portuguese footballer
- Vítor Machado Ferreira (born 2000), Portuguese footballer
- Vitor Flora (born 1990), Brazilian footballer
- Vítor da Fonseca (born 1946), Portuguese former butterfly swimmer

== G ==
- Vitor Gabriel (disambiguation)
- Vítor Gamito (born 1970), Portuguese former cyclist
- Vítor Gaspar (born 1960), Portuguese economist and former politician
- Vítor Gazimba (born 1987), Portuguese footballer
- Vitor Genz (born 1988), Brazilian auto racing driver
- Vítor Godinho (1944–2023), Portuguese footballer
- Vítor Gomes (born 1987), Portuguese footballer
- Vítor Gonçalves (disambiguation)
- Vítor Guilhar (1913–?), Portuguese footballer

== H ==
- Vítor Hugo (disambiguation)
- Vítor Huvos (born 1988), Brazilian footballer

== I ==
- Vitor Ishiy (born 1995), Brazilian table tennis player

== J ==
- Vítor Jacaré (born 1999), Brazilian footballer
- Vítor José (disambiguation)
- Vitor Júnior (born 1986), Brazilian footballer

== K ==
- Vitor Kley (born 1994), Brazilian singer-songwriter
- Vítor Krieger (born 1960), Brazilian archer

== L ==
- Vítor Ladeiras (born 1992), Portuguese footballer
- Vitor Leque (born 2001), Brazilian footballer
- Vítor Lima (born 1981), Portuguese footballer

== M ==
- Vítor Martins (born 1944), Brazilian songwriter
- Vítor Martins (footballer) (born 1950), Portuguese footballer
- Vítor Martins (football manager) (born 1985), Portuguese football manager
- Vitor Mendes (born 1999), Brazilian footballer
- Vítor Meira (born 1977), Brazilian auto racing driver who competed in IndyCar Series
- Vitor Miranda (born 1979), Brazilian kickboxer and mixed martial artist
- Vítor Moreno (born 1980), Cape Verdean footballer
- Vítor Murta (born 1979), Portuguese footballer

== N ==
- Vitor Negrete (1967–2006), climber, first Brazilian to climb Mount Everest
- Vítor Norte (born 1951), Portuguese actor

== O ==
- Vítor Oliveira (disambiguation)

== P ==
- Vítor Paneira (born 1966), Portuguese footballer
- Vítor Hugo Gomes Passos, known as Pelé (footballer, born 1987), Portuguese footballer
- Vítor Pereira (disambiguation)
- Vitor Gomes Pereira Junior, known as Juninho (footballer, born January 1989), Brazilian footballer
- Vitor Petrino (born 1997), Brazilian mixed martial artist
- Vítor Pinto (born 1986), Portuguese footballer
- Vítor Pontes (born 1958), Portuguese footballer

== R ==
- Vitor Ramil (born 1962) Brazilian musician, singer, composer, and writer
- Vitor Reis (born 2006), Brazilian footballer
- Vitor Ressurreição (born 1985), Brazilian footballer
- Vítor Ribeiro (born 1979), Brazilian mixed martial artist
- Vítor Riça (born 1974), Portuguese footballer
- Vitor Ricardo (born 2000), Brazilian footballer
- Vitor Roque (born 2005), Brazilian footballer

== S ==
- Vítor Saba (born 1990), Brazilian footballer
- Vítor Santos (born 1958), Portuguese footballer
- Vítor São Bento (born 1992), Portuguese footballer
- Vitor Sapienza (1933–2020), Brazilian politician and economist
- Vítor da Silva (disambiguation)

== T ==
- Vitor Tavares (born 1999), Brazilian badminton player
- Vitor Teixeira (born 1958), Brazilian equestrian
- Vítor Tormena (born 1996), Brazilian footballer

== V ==
- Vítor Valente (born 1965), Portuguese footballer
- Vítor Viana (1881—1937), Brazilian journalist, lawyer, and historian
- Vitor Vilela, Brazilian programmer and ROM hacker
- Vítor Vinha (born 1986), Portuguese footballer
