= Victor (name) =

Victor / Viktor
- Pronunciation: English: /ˈvɪktər/ VIK-tər; French: [viktɔʁ] German: [ˈvɪktoːɐ̯]
- Gender: masculine

Origin
- Derivation: Latin victor
- Meaning: "winner", "conqueror"

Other names
- Related names: Víctor, Vítor, Vittorio, Vittore, Avigdor, Wiktor, Victoria

Victor or Viktor is a given name and a surname. It is Latin in origin, meaning winner or conqueror, and the word “victor” still means this in Modern English.

Victor is an early Christian name, borne by several saints and three popes, symbolizing Jesus' victory over both sin and death.

== People with the given name and mononym ==
=== Aristocracy ===
- Victor Amadeus I, Duke of Savoy (1587–1637)
- Victor Amadeus II of Sardinia (1666–1732)
- Victor Amadeus III of Sardinia (1726–1796)
- Victor de Broglie (1756–1794), French soldier and politician, son of the 2nd duc de Broglie
- Victor de Broglie (1785–1870), 3rd duc de Broglie, French statesman and diplomat
- Victor de Broglie (1846–1906), 5th duc de Broglie, French politician and diplomat
- Victor Emmanuel I (1759–1824), Duke of Savoy and King of Sardinia
- Victor Emmanuel II (1820–1878), King of Sardinia and later Italy
- Victor Emmanuel III (1869–1947), King of Italy

=== Religion ===
- Pope Victor I (died 199), also a saint
- Pope Victor II (c. 1018–1057)
- Pope Victor III (c. 1026–1087)
- Antipope Victor IV (1138)
- Antipope Victor IV (1159–1164)
- Victor of Marseilles (died c. 290), a saint
- Victor Maurus (died c. 303), Victor the Moor or Victor of Milan, a saint
- Viktor of Xanten (died 4th century), a saint
- Victor I (bishop of Chur) (fl. 7th century)
- Victor II (bishop of Chur) (fl. 8th century)
- Victor III (bishop of Chur) (died in or before 836)
- Victor (bishop of Saint-Paul-Trois-Châteaux), 6th century
- Victor Tinambunan (born 1964), Indonesian religious leader

=== Academics ===
- Victor Babeș (1854–1926), Romanian biologist
- Victor Bailey (historian) (born 1948), British historian, author, and academic
- Victor Bright, American electrical engineer
- Victor Dzau (born 1945), Chinese-American doctor and academic
- Viktor Frankl (1905–1997), Austrian psychiatrist
- Victor Gautier (1824–1890), Swiss physician
- Victor Ginzburg (born 1957), Russian-American mathematician
- Victor Goldschmidt (1888–1947), Norwegian mineralogist
- Victor Gunnarsson (1953–1993), Swedish teacher
- Victor Kattan (born 1979), British legal academic
- Victor L. King (1886–1958), American chemist
- Viktor Kokochashvili (1904–1986), Georgian chemist
- Victor Loche (1806–1863), French zoologist
- Victor Ninov (born 1959), Bulgarian physicist
- Victor A. Pogadaev (born 1946), Russian historian, orientalist, and translator
- Victor Ricciardi, American professor of business and author
- Victor Scheinman (1942–2016), American robotics pioneer
- Victor Skumin (born 1948), Russian psychiatrist, psychotherapist and psychologist
- Victor Slăvescu (1891–1977), Romanian economist
- Victor Sumsky (born 1953), Russian orientalist and academician
- Victor Vâlcovici (1885–1970), Romanian mechanician and mathematician

=== Arts and entertainment ===
- Victor Ambrus (1935–2021), Hungarian-born British illustrator
- Victor Anastasi (1913–1992), Maltese designer and draughtsman
- Víctor Balaguer (1824–1901), Spanish poet and politician
- Victor Banerjee (born 1946), Indian actor
- Victor Borge (1909–2000), Danish-born American musician and comedian
- Victor Buono (1938–1982), American actor
- Victor Assis Brasil (1945–1981), Brazilian jazz saxophonist
- Víctor Català (1869–1966), pen name of the Spanish writer Caterina Albert
- Victor De La Rosa, American visual artist, educator
- Viktor Đerek (born 2000), Croatian photographer
- Víctor Erice (born 1940), Spanish film director
- Victor Fonfreide (1872–1934), French painter
- Victor French (1934–1989), American actor
- Victor Garber (born 1949), Canadian actor
- Victor Hugo (1802–1885), French writer
- Victor Honoré Janssens (1658–1736), Flemish painter
- Victor Ivaniv (1977–2015), Russian poet
- Víctor Jara (1932–1973), Chilean musician
- Victor J. Kemper (1927–2023), American cinematographer
- Victor Kunda (born 1999), British internet personality and model
- Victor Martinez (author) (1954–2011), Mexican American poet and author
- Victor Mature (1913–1999), American actor
- Victor McLaglen (1886–1959), British actor
- Victor Meirelles (1832–1903), Brazilian painter
- Vic Mignogna (born 1962), American actor
- Víctor Mora (comics) (1931–2016), Spanish writer of comic books
- Viktor Preiss (born 1947), Czech actor
- Victor Rasuk (born 1984), American actor
- Victor Rathnayake (born 1942), Sri Lankan Sinhala folk musician
- Victor Richards, British actor, writer and poet
- Victor Silvester (1900–1978), British dancer and bandleader
- Victor Sloan (born 1945), Irish artist
- Victor Socaciu (1953–2021), Romanian folk singer and composer
- Victor Spinetti (1929–2012), Welsh actor
- Víctor Trujillo (born 1961), Mexican comedian
- Viktor Tsoi (1962–1990), Russian musician
- Victor Willis (born 1951), American musician
- Victor Yerrid (born 1971), American puppeteer and voice actor

=== Business ===
- Victor Chandler (born 1951), British bookmaker and businessman
- Victor Civita (1907–1990), Brazilian publisher
- Victor Kassir (1910–1997), Lebanese businessman
- Victor Kiam (1926–2001), American entrepreneur
- Victor Niederhoffer (1943– 2026), American hedge fund manager, U.S. Squash Champion and Paddleball Champion, bestselling author, and statistician.
- Victor Li Tzar-kuoi (born 1964), Hong Kong businessman
- Victor Vargas (born 1952), Venezuelan entrepreneur and philanthropist
- Victor Vescovo (born 1966), American financier and undersea explorer

=== Crime ===
- Viktor Bout (born 1967), Russian arms dealer
- Víctor Manuel Gerena (born 1958), American fugitive robber
- Viktor Sayenko (born 1988), Ukrainian serial killer

=== Military ===
- Victor H. Czegka (1880–1973), Austrian-American Marine officer
- Victor Gunasekara (1921–1993), Sri Lankan Sinhala army major and civil servant
- Victor Jones (British Army officer), Second World War British Army officer
- Viktor Pylypenko (soldier) (born 1986), Ukrainian soldier and LGBTQ rights activist
- Viktor Nikolayevich Sokolov (born 1962), Russian naval officer
- Viktor Zolotov (born 1954), Russian military officer

=== Politics and diplomacy ===
- Victor Backlund (born 1936), American politician and athlete
- Victor Bădulescu (1892–1953), Romanian economist, lawyer, and diplomat
- Victor Banks (born 1947), Anguillan politician
- Viktor Laiskodat (born 1965), Indonesian politician
- Victor de Broglie (1756–1794), French soldier and politician
- Victor de Broglie (1785–1870), 3rd duc de Broglie, French statesman and diplomat
- Victor de Broglie (1846–1906), 5th duc de Broglie, French politician and diplomat
- Victor Ciorbea (born 1954), Romanian politician
- Victor Conyngham, 5th Marquess Conyngham (1883–1918), British politician
- Victor Corea (1871–1962), Sri Lankan Sinhala politician and lawyer
- Victor Deleu (1876–1939), Romanian politician
- Victor Gram (1910–1969), Danish politician
- Viktor Grishin (1914–1992), Soviet politician
- Viktor Gutić (1901–1947), Croatian politician and war criminal
- Victor Jackovich (born 1948), American diplomat
- Victor Jansen (born 2001), Brazilian politician
- Victor Kamber (born 1943), American political consultant
- Viktor Klima (born 1947), Austrian politician
- Víctor Hipólito Martínez (1924–2017), former Vice President of Argentina
- Victor A. Nicholas (1897–1956), Postmaster General of Sri Lanka
- Viktor Orbán (born 1963), Hungarian politician
- Victor Owusu (1923–2000), Ghanaian lawyer and politician
- Victor Perera, Sri Lankan governor
- Victor Anthony Perera, Sri Lankan politician and former Member of Parliament
- Victor Ponta (born 1972), Romanian politician
- Victor Rădulescu-Pogoneanu (1910–1962), Romanian diplomat
- Victor Garvin Weerawardana Ratnayake (1908–1994), Sri Lankan politician
- Victor Rutgers (1877–1945), Dutch legal scholar and politician
- Vico Sotto (born 1989), Filipino politician
- Victor Mailangkay (born 1957), Indonesian politician
- Victor Stănculescu (1928–2016), Romanian general officer and politician
- Victor Stern (1885–1958), Austrian philosopher and politician
- Victor L. Tomseth (born 1941), American former diplomat
- Viktor Yanukovych (born 1950), Ukrainian politician
- Viktor Yushchenko (born 1954), Ukrainian politician

=== Sports ===
- Viktor (wrestler) (Eric Thompson, born 1980), Canadian professional wrestler
- Viktor Apostolov (born 1962), Bulgarian hammer thrower
- Viktor Axelsen (born 1994), Danish badminton player
- Victor Leandro Bagy (born 1983), Brazilian football player known simply as Victor
- Víctor Baute (born 1972), Spanish boxer
- Vic Bellamy (born 1963), American football player
- Viktor Berg (born 1977), Canadian squash player
- Víctor Bird (born 1982), Puerto Rican volleyball player
- Victor Boniface (born 2000), Nigerian football player
- Víctor Blasco (born 1994), Spanish footballer
- Victor Corrêa (born 1990), Brazilian race car driver
- Victor Cruz (American football) (born 1986), American football player
- Victor Davis (1964–1989), Canadian Olympic champion swimmer
- Victor Dimukeje (born 1999), American football player
- Victor Eklund (born 2006), Swedish ice hockey player
- Viktor Fischer (born 1994), Danish footballer
- Víctor Genes (1961–2019), Paraguayan footballer and football manager
- Viktor Gyökeres (born 1998), Swedish football player
- Víctor Hugo González (born 1974), Colombian cyclist
- Victor Hedman (born 1990), National Hockey League player from Sweden
- Victor Heflin (born 1960), American football player
- Víctor Herrera (cyclist) (born 1970), Colombian cyclist
- Víctor Herrera Piggott (born 1980), Panamanian footballer
- Victor Hicks (born 1957), American football player
- Victor Houston (athlete) (born 1974), Barbadian track and field athlete
- Victor Johansen (born 1994), Norwegian footballer
- Victor Johansson (born 1998), Swedish swimmer
- Viktor Johansson (born 1998), Swedish footballer
- Victor Jones (cricketer) (1881–1923), Australian cricketer
- Victor Jones (linebacker) (born 1966), American football player
- Victor Jones (running back) (born 1967), American football player
- Viktor Karlsson (born 1988), Swedish bandy player
- Viktor Kasatkin (born 1942), Soviet sprinter
- Viktor Kassai (born 1975), Hungarian football referee
- Victor Kros (born 1981), Dutch football player
- Viktor Kuznetsov (swimmer) (born 1961), Russian swimmer
- Victor Lindelöf (born 1994) Swedish football player
- Victor Loturi (born 2001), Canadian soccer player
- Victor Lovera (born 2000), French cross-country skier
- Víctor Maldonado (born 1939), Venezuelan hurdler
- Víctor Martínez (athlete) (born 1975), Andorran middle-distance runner
- Víctor Martínez (baseball) (born 1978), Venezuelan-born Major League Baseball player
- Víctor Martínez (bodybuilder) (born 1973), Dominican professional bodybuilder
- Victor Matfield (born 1977), South African rugby player
- Viktor Mazin (1954–2022), Soviet weightlifter
- Viktor Mitrou (born 1973), Greek weightlifter
- Victor Montalvo (born 1994), American breakdancer
- Víctor Mora (athlete) (born 1944), Colombian retired long-distance runner
- Victor Moses (born 1990), Nigerian football player
- Víctor Hugo Mora (born 1974), Mexican football manager
- Víctor Moreno (born 1979), Venezuelan baseball player
- Víctor Moreno (cyclist) (born 1985), Venezuelan cyclist
- Víctor Muñoz (footballer, born 1957) (born 1957), Spanish football coach and player
- Victor Nelsson (born 1998), Danish football player
- Victor Oladipo (born 1992), American basketball player
- Viktor Olsen (1924–2023), Norwegian long-distance runner
- Viktor Onopko (born 1969), Russian football coach and former player
- Victor Ortíz (born 1987), American boxer
- Victor Osimhen (born 1998), Nigerian professional footballer
- Victor Perez ("Young"; 1911–45), Tunisian flyweight boxer
- Viktor Podloucký (born 1950), Czechoslovak sprint canoer
- Victor Primeau (born 2003), Canadian freestyle skier
- Victor Quintana (born 1976), Paraguayan football player
- Víctor Rivera (football manager) (born 1968), Peruvian football manager
- Victor Rivera (volleyball) (born 1976), Puerto Rican volleyball player
- Víctor Robles (born 1997), Dominican baseball player
- Victor Ross (1900–1974), American lacrosse player
- Víctor Sánchez (born 1976), Spanish footballer
- Victor Scott (born 1962), American football player
- Victor Scott II (born 2001), American baseball player
- Victor "Vic" Seixas (1923–2024), American tennis player
- Victor Simões (born 1981), Brazilian footballer
- Viktor Solmunde (born 2007), Danish skateboarder
- Viktor Spasov (born 1957), Soviet pole vaulter
- Victor Torp (born 1999), Danish footballer
- Viktor Troicki (born 1986), Serbian tennis player
- Victor Trumper (1877–1915), Australian cricketer
- Victor Wembanyama (born 2004), French basketball Player
- Víctor Valdés (born 1982), Spanish football goalkeeper
- Viktor Zaitsev (born 1966), Uzbekistani javelin thrower
- Chick Zamick (1926–2007), Canadian ice hockey player and coach
- Viktor Zhurba (born 1950), Soviet discus thrower

=== Other people ===
- Victor Agosto (born 1985), American anti-war activist
- Victor of Aveyron (1785–1828), French feral child
- Victor Chang (1936–1991), Australian–Chinese cardiac surgeon
- Victor Horta (1861–1947), Belgian architect
- Victor Korchnoi (1931–2016), Soviet-born Swiss chess player
- Viktor Nikolaevich Kokosov (born 1963), Russian journalist and writer
- Victor Marchetti (1929–2018), American intelligence agent and author
- Víctor Martínez (disambiguation)
- Victor Riesel, American newspaper journalist attacked with sulfuric acid by the mafia
- Victor Rivera (bishop) (1916–2005), American Episcopalian bishop
- Victor Rivera Gonzalez (born 1948), Puerto Rican police chief and lawyer
- Viktor Schauberger (1885–1958), Austrian forester and inventor
- Victor Ukpolo (born 1950), Nigerian-born American university administrator

== People with the surname ==
- Aglailson Victor (born 1995), Brazilian politician
- Alexander F. Victor (fl. 1910s–1920s), founder of the Victor Animatograph Corporation
- Benjamin Victor, multiple people
- Binjimen Victor (born 1997), American football player
- Carol Victor, Hereditary Prince of Albania (1913–1973)
- Charles Victor (1896–1965), English actor
- Daniel Victor (born 1979), Canadian musician and producer
- Diane Victor (born 1964), South African artist and printmaker
- Divya Victor (born 1983), India-born Tamil American poet
- Eva Victor (born 1994), American actor, writer and director
- Frances Fuller Victor (1826–1902), American historian, poet, and journalist
- Gary Victor (1954), Haitian novelist, playwright and screenwriter
- Henry Victor (1892–1945), English-born American silent film actor
- Idara Victor, (born 1987), American actress
- Jaclyn Victor (born 1978), Malaysian musician
- Jacob Nash Victor (1835–1907), American civil engineer
- James Victor, multiple people
- John Victor, multiple people
- Jonathan David Victor (born 1954), American neuroscientist
- Lina Iris Viktor, British-Liberian visual artist
- Lincoln Victor (born 2001), American football player
- Lindon Victor (born 1993), Grenadian decathlon athlete
- Louis Victor, Prince of Carignano
- Lucien Victor (1931–1995), Belgian road racing cyclist
- Mark Victor, American screenwriter
- Pau Víctor (born 2001), Spanish football player
- Paul-Émile Victor (1907–1995), French ethnographer, polar explorer, and author
- Paulo Victor, multiple people
- Renée Victor (1938–2025), American actress
- Sally Victor (1905–1977), American milliner
- Teva Victor, (born 1971), French Polynesian sculptor

== Fictional characters ==
- Victor Baxter, in the television series That's So Raven and Cory in the House
- Victor Borkowski, in the X-Men comics, also known as Anole
- Victor Chevalier, a character in Tekken series
- Victor Creed, the real name of Sabretooth, a character from the X-Men series
- Victor Donovan, a character in Dead or Alive series
- Victor Frankenstein, in the 1818 novel Frankenstein by Mary Shelley
- Victor Fries, a villain in the Batman series, also known as Mr. Freeze
- "Count Victor Grazinski", alias of Victoria Grant, protagonist of the 1982 film Victor/Victoria
- Victor Kiriakis, in the television series Days of Our Lives
- Viktor Krum, in the Harry Potter series
- Vic Mackey, on the television series The Shield
- Victor Mancha, in the Runaways comic book
- Victor Meldrew, in the television series One Foot in the Grave
- Victor Newman, in the television series The Young and the Restless
- Victor Quartermaine, in the television series Wallace and Gromit
- Victor Shade, alias for the Marvel superhero Vision
- Victor Stone, DC Comics superhero better known as Cyborg
- Victor "Sully" Sullivan, from the Uncharted series
- Victor Timely, from the Avengers comics, a divergent variant of Kang the Conqueror
- Victor Van Dort, in the 2005 animated film Corpse Bride
- Victor Vance, protagonist of the video game Grand Theft Auto: Vice City Stories
- Victor Von Doom, in the Fantastic Four comics
- Victor von Gerdenheim, in the Darkstalkers video game series
- Viktor (Suikoden), in the Suikoden video game series
- Victor Zsasz, a serial killer featured in the Batman series
- Victor (mascot), the logo and mascot for the Just for Laughs comedy festival
- Victor (Dollhouse), from Joss Whedon's Dollhouse
- Viktor (Underworld), from the Underworld film series
- Victor (Breaking Bad), an underling of Gustavo Fring in the series Breaking Bad
- Viktor (League of Legends/Arcane) a Zaunite scientist and leader of The Glorious Evolution

== See also ==
- Victor (disambiguation)
- Saint Victorian (disambiguation)
- St. Victor (disambiguation)
- Victory (disambiguation)
- Victoria (disambiguation), feminine form of the name
- Víctor, Spanish and Catalan given name
- Vítor, Portuguese given name
- Avigdor (name), Hebrew given name
- Vittorio, Italian given namen
- Wiktor, Polish given name
- Vincent (literally "winning" or "conquering")
