= Wiktor =

- Pronunciation: Polish pronunciation: [ˈvik.tɔr]
- Gender: masculine
- Language: Polish

Origin
- Derivation: Latin victor
- Meaning: "winner", "conqueror"
- Region of origin: Poland

Other names
- Variant form: Wiktoria (female)
- Related names: Victor, Víctor, Vítor, Vittorio, Vittore, Avigdor, Victoria

Wiktor is a Polish masculine given name. It is the Polish form of the name Victor, meaning "winner" or "conqueror".

The feminine form of the name is Wiktoria.

== Notable people with the name ==
- Wiktor Alter (1890–1943), Polish-Jewish socialist activist and Bund publicist
- Wiktor Andersson (1887–1966), Swedish film actor
- Wiktor Balcarek (1915–1998), Polish chess player
- Wiktor Biegański (1892–1974), Polish actor, film director and screenwriter
- Wiktor Bogacz (born 2004), Polish footballer
- Wiktor Brillant (1877–1942), Polish pharmacist
- Wiktor Budzyński (1888–1976), ethnic Polish politician in the Republic of Lithuania
- Wiktor Bukato (1949–2021), Polish translator and publisher
- Wiktor Chabel (born 1985), Polish rower
- Wiktor Dega (1896–1995), Polish surgeon and orthopedist
- Wiktor Długosz (born 2000), Polish footballer
- Wiktor Durlak (born 1983), Polish politician
- Wiktor Eckhaus (1930–2000), Polish–Dutch mathematician
- Wiktor Gilewicz (1907–1948), Polish officer
- Wiktor Głazunow (born 1993), Polish canoeist
- Wiktor Godlewski (1831–1900), Polish nobleman, explorer and naturalist
- Wiktor Gomulicki (1848–1919), Polish poet, novelist and essayist
- Wiktor Grodecki (born 1960), Polish film director, screenwriter and producer
- Wiktor Grotowicz (1919–1985), Polish actor
- Wiktor Hoechsmann (1894–1977), Polish cyclist
- Wiktor Jassem (1922–2016), Polish phonetician, philologist and linguist
- Wiktor Kemula (1902–1985), Polish chemist
- Jan Wiktor Kiepura (1902–1966), Polish opera singer and actor
- Wiktor Kinecki (1929–2026), Polish politician and diplomat
- Wiktor Komorowski (1887–1952), Polish fighter ace
- Wiktor Kulesza (born 2003), Polish ice dancer
- Wiktor Kurnatowski (?-1846), Polish lithographer and conspirator
- Wiktor Łabuński (1895–1974), Polish-American pianist, conductor and composer
- Wiktor Lampart (born 2001), Polish speedway rider
- Jan Wiktor Lesman (1898–1966), known as Jan Brzechwa, Polish poet, author and lawyer
- Wiktor Litwiński, Polish President of Warsaw from 1906 to 1909
- Wiktor Łomidze (1900–1956), Georgian-Polish military officer
- Wiktor Malinowski (born 1994), Polish professional poker player
- Wiktor Andrzej Moszczyński (born 1946), British-Polish journalist, political activist and author
- Wiktor Nilsson (born 2002), Swedish ice hockey player
- Wiktor Olecki (1909–1981), Polish cyclist
- Wiktor Ormicki (1898–1941), Polish geographer and cartographer
- Wiktor Pleśnierowicz (born 2001), Polish footballer
- Wiktor Podoski (1901–1970), Polish painter
- Wiktor Poliszczuk (1925–2008), Polish-Ukrainian-Canadian politologist
- Wiktor Zygmunt Przedpełski (1891–1941), Polish socialist and activist
- Wiktor Przyjemski (born 2005), Polish speedway rider
- Wiktor Sadowski (born 1956), Polish artist
- Wiktor Sawicki (born 1955), Polish runner
- Andrew Wiktor Schally (1926–2024), Polish-American endocrinologist
- Wiktor Skworc (born 1948), Polish Roman Catholc prelate
- Wiktor Suwara (born 1996), Polish sprinter
- Wiktor Szelągowski (1900–1935), Polish rower
- Wiktor Szostalo (born 1952), Polish sculptor
- Wiktor Thommée (1881–1962), Polish Army brigadier general
- Wiktor Tołkin (1922–2013), Polish sculptor and architect
- Wiktor Tomczak (born 2002), Polish handball player
- Wiktor Tomir Drymmer (1896–1975), Polish Army colonel and intelligence officer
- Wiktor Unander (1872–1967), Swedish officer and diplomat
- Wiktor Weintraub (1908–1988), Polish historian
- Wiktor Wiechaczek (1879–1941), Polish soldier
- Jan Wiktor Wiśniewski (1922–2006), Polish footballer
- Wiktor Wojtas (born 1986), known as TaZ, Polish e-sports competitor
- Wiktor Woroszylski (1927—1996), Polish poet, writer and translator
- Wiktor Wysoczański (born 1939), Polish Old Catholic bishop
- Jan Wiktor Zawidzki (1866–1928), Polish chemist
- Karol Wiktor Zawodziński (1890–1949), Polish literary critic, theoretist and historian of literature
- Wiktor Zborowski (born 1951), Polish actor and singer
- Wiktor Zieliński (born 2001), Polish professional pool player
- Wiktor Zin (1925–2007), Polish architect, graphic artist, professor
- Wiktor Żwikiewicz (born 1950), Polish science fiction writer
- Wiktor Zysman, birth name of Bruno Jasieński (1901–1938), Polish poet, novelist and playwright

== See also ==
- Andrzej Wiktor (1931-2018), Polish zoologist
- Victor (name)
- Wiktoria
