= Vítor (disambiguation) =

Vítor is a masculine given name.

Vítor or Vitor may also refer to:

== People ==
- Vitor (footballer, born 1953), Brazilian footballer Vitor de Paula Braga
- Vítor (footballer, born 1972), Brazilian footballer Claudemir Vítor Marques
- Vítor (footballer, born 1982), Brazilian footballer Cícero Vítor dos Santos Júnior
- Vitor (footballer, born 1997), Brazilian footballer Romildo Vitor Gomes Ferreira Neto
- Carlos Vitor (born 1971), Brazilian football coach and former player
- Diogo Vitor (born 1997), Brazilian footballer
- João Vitor (disambiguation)
- Miguel Vítor (born 1989), Portuguese footballer
- Paulo Vitor (disambiguation)
- Pedro Vitor (born 1998), Brazilian footballer
- Rafael Vitor (born 1993), Brazilian footballer
- Zé Vitor (disambiguation)

== Other uses ==
- Vitor District, Peru
