= João Vitor =

João Vitor may refer to:

== Association football ==
- João Vitor (footballer, born 1983), João Vitor da Silva, Brazilian centre-back
- João Vítor (footballer, born 1987), João Vítor Albano Manuel, Swiss defender
- João Vitor (footballer, born 1988), João Vitor Lima Gomes, Brazilian midfielder
- João Vitor (footballer, born 1991), João Vitor Ribeiro Rodrigues, Brazilian midfielder for Tupi
- João Vitor (footballer, born 1998), João Vitor de Souza Martins, Brazilian midfielder for Chapecoense
- João Vitor (footballer, born 2000), João Vitor Moreira dos Santos, Brazilian forward for Araguaína
- João Vitor (footballer, born 2002), João Vitor Cardoso de Souza, Brazilian right-back for Portuguesa
- João Vitor (footballer, born 2005), João Vitor Fonseca da Silva, Brazilian wingback for Vasco da Gama
- João Vitor (footballer, born 2007), João Vitor Barros Silva, Brazilian football right-back for Corinthians

== Other sports ==
- João Vítor de Oliveira (born 1992), Brazilian hurdler
- João Vitor (basketball) (born 1998), João Vitor França dos Santos, Brazilian basketball player

== See also ==
- João Victor (disambiguation)
