= Vítor Martins (disambiguation) =

Vítor Martins (born 1944) is a Brazilian songwriter.

Vítor Martins may also refer to:

- Vítor Martins (footballer) (born 1950), Portuguese footballer
- Vítor Martins (football manager) (born 1985), Portuguese football manager

== See also ==
- Victor Martins (born 2001), French and Portuguese rally driver
- Victor Martin, various people
- Víctor Martínez, various people
