= Mattithiah =

Mattithiah is a given name. Notable people with the name include:

- Mattithiah Ahrweiler (c. 1650–1728), German rabbi
- Matteya ben Heresh (Mattithiah ben Heresh), 2nd-century Roman tanna
- Mattithiah ben Solomon Delacrut, Mordecai Yoffe's teacher in Cabala

== See also ==
- Matthew (name)
