= Víctor =

- Gender: masculine
- Language: Spanish, Catalan

Origin
- Derivation: Latin victor
- Meaning: "winner", "conqueror"

Other names
- Related names: Victor, Vítor, Vittorio, Vittore, Avigdor, Wiktor, Victoria

Víctor is a Spanish and Catalan masculine given name. It is derived from the Latin name Victor, meaning "winner" or "conqueror". It is equivalent to Vítor in Portuguese.

Notable people with the name include:

- Víctor Barrio (1987–2016), Spanish bullfighter
- Víctor Cabrera (Argentine footballer) (born 1993)
- Víctor Cabrera (Chilean footballer) (born 1957)
- Víctor Hugo Cabrera (born 1968), Colombian actor
- Víctor Manuel Camacho (1946–2015), Mexican politician
- Víctor Carrillo (born 1975), Peruvian football referee
- Víctor Hermosillo y Celada (born 1939), Mexican politician
- Víctor Raul Díaz Chávez, Peruvian politician
- Víctor Casadesús (born 1985), Spanish footballer
- Víctor Emeric (born 1952), Puerto Rican politician
- Víctor Espárrago (born 1944), Uruguayan football coach
- Víctor Fernández (born 1960), Spanish football coach
- Víctor Fernández (equestrian), Argentine Olympic equestrian
- Víctor Fernández (footballer, born 1987), Spanish footballer
- Victor Fernández (footballer, born 1998), Spanish footballer
- Víctor Fernández (footballer, born 2007), Spanish footballer
- Víctor Manuel Fernández (born 1962), Argentine cardinal and theologian
- Víctor Manuel Fernández Gutiérrez (born 1974), known as Víctor, Spanish football player and coach
- Victor Garcia (director) (1934–1982), Argentine director
- Víctor Garcia (Spanish director) (born 1974), Spanish film director
- Víctor García (Spanish singer) (born 1970)
- Víctor García (Mexican singer) (born 1975)
- Víctor García (racing driver) (born 1990), Spanish racing driver
- Víctor García (volleyball) (born 1950), Cuban volleyball player
- Víctor García (cyclist) (born 1981), Spanish cyclist
- Víctor García (runner) (born 1985), Spanish runner
- Víctor Hugo García (born 1994), Venezuelan footballer
- Víctor García Marín, (born 1994), Spanish footballer
- Víctor García (footballer, born 1995), Salvadoran footballer
- Víctor García (footballer, born 1997), Spanish footballer
- Víctor García (water polo) (born 1953), Mexican water polo player
- Víctor Manuel García Valdés (1897–1969), Cuban painter
- Víctor Andrés García Belaúnde (born 1949), Peruvian politician
- Víctor Hugo García Rodríguez (born 1965), Mexican politician
- Víctor Genes (1961–2019), Paraguayan footballer
- Víctor Jara (1932–1973), Chilean singer-songwriter and theatre director
- Víctor Mancilla (1921–2011), Chilean footballer
- Victor Martinez (author) (1954–2011), American poet and author
- Víctor Martínez (baseball) (born 1978), Venezuelan baseball player
- Víctor Martínez (bodybuilder) (born 1973), Dominican bodybuilder
- Víctor Martínez (runner) (born 1975), Andorran middle-distance runner
- Víctor Hipólito Martínez (1924–2017), Argentine lawyer and politician
- Víctor Navarro, Venezuelan activist
- Víctor Mayorga (born 1942), Peruvian lawyer and politician
- Víctor Mora (comics) (1931–2016), Spanish comic book writer
- Víctor Mora (athlete) (born 1944), Colombian long-distance runner
- Victor Muñoz (footballer, born 1990), Spanish footballer
- Víctor Muñoz (footballer, born 2003), Spanish footballer
- Víctor Muñoz Manrique (born 1957), Spanish football player and manager
- Víctor Manuel Muñoz, Colombian industrial engineer and public official
- Víctor Manuel Ortíz (1965–2021), Puerto Rican politician
- Víctor Pecci (born 1955), Paraguayan tennis player
- Víctor Púa (born 1956), Uruguayan footballer
- Víctor Rivera (football manager) (born 1968), Peruvian football manager
- Víctor Rivera (volleyball) (born 1976), Puerto Rican volleyball player
- Víctor Rivera (wrestler) (born 1944), Puerto Rican wrestler
- Victor Rivera (bishop) (1916–2005), Puerto Rican bishop
- Víctor Rivera (judoka) (born 1965), Puerto Rican judoka
- Víctor Hugo Rivera (born 1967), Peruvian football referee
- Víctor Rodríguez (wrestler) (born 1974), Mexican wrestler
- Víctor Rodríguez (Andorran footballer) (born 1987)
- Víctor Rodríguez Andrade (1927–1985), Uruguayan footballer
- Víctor Rodríguez Romero (born 1989), Spanish footballer
- Víctor Rodríguez Núñez (born 1955), Cuban poet and journalist
- Víctor Valdés (born 1982), Spanish footballer
- Víctor Vassallo (born 1960), Puerto Rican politician

== See also ==
- Victor (name)
