= Gerrit Bos =

Dutch academic (born 1948)

Gerrit Bos (born 8 July 1948 in Apeldoorn) is professor emeritus of Jewish studies.

== Life ==
Gerrit Bos studied classical languages (1973–1974) and theology (1974–1975) at the Utrecht University, Semitic languages and literature at the University of Amsterdam (1976–1982), BA (1982), Yiddish with Leib Fuks (1980), Jewish and Islamic Studies at the Hebrew University of Jerusalem (1982–1985), the Talmud at the Center for Conservative Judaism (with Theodore Friedman, 1983) and Hebrew and Arabic Language and Literature at the Vrije Universiteit Amsterdam (1985–1988), MA 1985, Master's thesis: Al-Farabi’s Al-Mahut ha-Nefesh (On the Essence of the Soul); Dr. phil. 1989, dissertation: The Treatise of Qusta ibn Luqa on the Regimen During the Pilgrimage to Mecca, supervised by Hans Daiber.

From 1976 to 1988 he worked as a cataloguer of Hebraica, Judaica and Arabica for the Antiquariaat Spinoza in Amsterdam. From 1988 to 1989 he was a trainee research assistant and from 1990 to 1992 researcher at the Institute of Semitic Languages at the Vrije Universiteit Amsterdam. From 1992 to 1995 he was a research fellow at the Wellcome Institute for the History of Medicine (University College London). From 1993 to 1996 he worked as a tutor for Jewish studies at Leo Baeck College. From 1996 to 1997 he was active as a lecturer at the Department of Hebrew and Jewish Studies at the University College London. From 1997 to 2013 he was professor for Jewish studies and chair of the Martin Buber Institute for Jewish Studies at the University of Cologne.

His main fields of research are medieval Jewish-Islamic science, especially medicine, medieval Hebrew and Judeo-Arabic.

He is the editor of the 17-volume critical new edition of the medical works of Moses Maimonides, The Medical Works of Moses Maimonides (2002–2021), which includes medieval Hebrew and Latin translations as well as a new English translation in addition to the first-time edition of the original Arabic texts. Furthermore, he is also the editor of Ibn al-Jazzar's 7-volume therapeutic compendium Zad al-musafir wa-qut al-hadir (Provision for the Traveller and Nourishment for the Sedentary), of which books 1–2, 6, and 7 have been published so far (1997–2022).

His research is focused on

a) the study of medieval Hebrew medical terminology, in particular those terms that do not appear in the common dictionaries. These terms have been compiled in eight volumes under the title Novel Medical and General Hebrew Terminology (2011–2025), documented in detail and summarized for the first four volumes in a dictionary (A Concise Dictionary of Novel Medical and General Hebrew Terminology from the Middle Ages, 2019);

b) medico-botanical terms from medieval synonym lists in Hebrew characters in Hebrew, Arabic, Romance (especially Old Occitan), and German (in cooperation with Klaus-Dietrich Fischer). In cooperation with Guido Mensching (Romance studies, University of Göttingen), several of these lists containing Romance terms have been edited. As a result of these studies, a project aiming at constructing an ontology-based information system for Old Occitan medico-botanical terminology, the online dictionary DiTMAO (Dictionnaire des termes médico-botaniques de l'ancien occitan), is in progress (in collaboration with Guido Mensching, Emiliano Giovannetti, Andrea Bozzi and Maria Sofia Corridini);

c) the edition of works by medieval Christian, Muslim and Jewish physicians, such as Qusta ibn Luqa, Abu Bakr al-Razi, Ibn al-Jazzar, Marwan ibn Janah, Moses Maimonides, Nathan ben Jo'el Falaquera and Moses of Narbonne, and translators into Hebrew, such as Do'eg ha-Edomi, Moses ibn Tibbon, Shem Tov ben Isaac of Tortosa, Nathan ha-Me'ati and Zerahiah Ḥen;

d) the medieval tradition of the reception of Galen in the works of, among others, Maimonides, Hunayn ibn Ishaq or Sergius of Reshaina (in cooperation with, inter alia, Y. Tzvi Langermann);

e) various topics of medieval Jewish-Islamic popular science, such as astrological medicine, weather forecasting; magic (ornithomancy, scapulimancy); stone lore.

== Selected works ==
=== Editions ===
a) Maimonides

- The Medical Works of Moses Maimonides. Parallel Arabic-English editions and translations, with editions of the medieval Hebrew and Latin translations, in collaboration with Charles Burnett, Y. Tzvi Langermann and Michael R. McVaugh. 17 vols. 1–10: Brigham Young University Press, Provo, Utah 2002–2017; 11–17: Brill, Leiden 2018–2021.
1. On Asthma, vol. 1. ISBN 978-0-8425-2475-9
2. Medical Aphorisms, vol. 1 (Treatises 1–5). ISBN 978-0-9348-9375-6
3. Medical Aphorisms, vol. 2 (Treatises 6–9). ISBN 978-0-8425-2664-7
4. On Asthma, vol. 2. ISBN 978-0-8425-2690-6
5. On Poisons and the Protection against Lethal Drugs. ISBN 978-0-8425-2730-9
6. Medical Aphorisms, vol. 3 (Treatises 10–15). ISBN 978-0-8425-2780-4
7. On Hemorrhoids. ISBN 978-0-8425-2789-7
8. On Rules Regarding the Practical Part of the Medical Art. ISBN 978-0-8425-2837-5
9. Medical Aphorisms, vol. 4 (Treatises 16–21). ISBN 978-0-8425-2843-6
10. Medical Aphorisms, vol. 5 (Treatises 22–25). ISBN 978-0-8425-2876-4
11. On Coitus. ISBN 978-90-04-38006-6
12. On the Regimen of Health. ISBN 978-90-04-39405-6
13. On the Elucidation of Some Symptoms and the Response to Them (Formerly Known as On the Causes of Symptoms). ISBN 978-90-04-39845-0
14. Commentary on Hippocrates’ Aphorisms. 2 vols. ISBN 978-90-04-41287-3 / ISBN 978-90-04-42552-1
15. Medical Aphorisms: Hebrew Translation by Nathan ha-Mea’ti. ISBN 978-90-04-42816-4
16. Medical Aphorisms: Hebrew Translation by Zerahyah ben She’altiel Hen. ISBN 978-90-04-42818-8
17. Medical Aphorisms: Glossary & Indexes. ISBN 978-90-04-46220-5
- The Medical Works of Moses Maimonides. New English Translations based on the Critical Editions of the Arabic Manuscripts. Brill, Leiden 2021. ISBN 978-90-04-49887-7

b) Ibn al-Jazzar

- On Forgetfulness and Its Treatment. Critical edition of the Arabic text and the Hebrew translations with commentary and translation into English. London 1995.
- Zād al-musāfir wa-qūt al-ḥāḍir. Critical edition of the original Arabic text, with English translation, introduction and commentary. Kegan Paul, London 1997–2000; Brill, Leiden 2015–2025.
1. On Sexual Diseases and Their Treatment. A Critical edition of Zād al-musāfir wa-qūt al-ḥāḍir (Provisions for the Traveller and Nourishment for the Sedentary), Book 6. London 1997.
2. On Fevers. A Critical edition of Zād al-musāfir wa-qūt al-ḥāḍir (Provisions for the Traveller and Nourishment for the Sedentary), Book 7, Chapters 1–6. London 2000.
3. Zād al-musāfir wa-qūt al-ḥāḍir (Provisions for the Traveller and Nourishment for the Sedentary), Book 7 (7–30), with a critical edition of Moses ibn Tibbon’s Hebrew translation (Ṣedat ha-Derakhim). Brill, Leiden 2015. ISBN 978-90-04-28847-8
4. Zād al-musāfir wa-qūt al-ḥāḍir (Provisions for the Traveller and Nourishment for the Sedentary), Books 1 and 2: Diseases of the Head and the Face, with critical editions of the medieval Hebrew translations and the medieval Latin translation, in collaboration with Fabian Käs and Michael R. McVaugh. Brill, Leiden 2022. ISBN 978-90-04-50029-7
5. Zād al-musāfir wa-qūt al-ḥāḍir (Provisions for the Traveller and Nourishment for the Sedentary), Books 3, 4 and 5: Diseases of the Internal Organs. A Parallel Arabic-English Edition and Translation by Gerrit Bos and Fabian Käs, Leiden 2025. ISBN 978-90-047461-4

c) Others

- Al-Kindi, Scientific Weather Forecasting in the Middle Ages. The writings of Al-Kindī. Studies, editions, and translations of the Arabic, Hebrew and Latin texts, in collaboration with Charles Burnett. London 2000.
- Shem Tov ben Isaac of Tortosa, Medical Synonym Lists from Medieval Provence. Sefer ha-Shimmush, Book 29. Part 1 – Edition and Commentary of List 1 (Hebrew-Arabic-Romance/Latin), in collaboration with Martina Hussein, Guido Mensching and Frank Savelsberg. Brill, Leiden 2011. ISBN 978-90-04-16764-3
- Shem Tov ben Isaac of Tortosa, Medical Glossaries in the Hebrew Tradition. Sefer Almansur. With a supplement on the Romance and Latin terminology, in collaboration with Guido Mensching and Julia Zwink. Brill, Leiden 2017. ISBN 978-90-04-35202-5
- Marwan ibn Janah, On the Nomenclature of Medicinal Drugs (Kitāb al-Talkhīṣ). Edition, translation, and commentary, with special reference to the Ibero-Romance terminology, in collaboration with Fabian Käs, Mailyn Lübke and Guido Mensching. 2 vols. Brill, Leiden 2020. ISBN 978-90-04-41333-7
- Abraham Abigdor, A Fragment of Abraham Avigdor’s Translation of Gerard de Solo’s Practica from the Cairo Genizah: Edition and Analysis with Special Regard to the Old Occitan Elements, Aleph 21.2 (2021): 309–357, in collaboration with Sandra Hajek and Guido Mensching.

=== Research ===
a) Medieval Hebrew medical terminology

- Novel Medical and General Hebrew Terminology. 8 vols. 1–3: Oxford University Press (Journal of Semitic Studies, Supplement Series), Oxford 2011–2016; 4–8: Brill, Leiden 2018–2025. ISBN 978-90-04-38261-9 / ISBN 978-90-04-47279-2 ISBN 978-90-04-53440-7 ISBN 978-90-04-69771-3 ISBN 978-90-04-74334-2
- A Concise Dictionary of Novel Medical and General Hebrew Terminology from the Middle Ages. Brill, Leiden 2019. ISBN 978-90-04-39865-8

b) Medieval medico-botanical synonym lists

- Hebrew Medical Synonym Literature. Romance and Latin Terms and Their Identification, Aleph 5 (2005): 169–211, in collaboration with Guido Mensching.
- Arabic-Romance Medico-botanical Synonym Lists in Hebrew Manuscripts from the Iberian Peninsula and Italy (Vatican Library, Fourteenth–Fifteenth Century), Aleph 15.1 (2015): 9–61, in collaboration with Guido Mensching.
- A Glimpse into Medical Practice among Jews around 1500. Latin-German Pharmaceuticasl Glossaries in Hebrew Characters Extant in Ms Leiden, Universiteitsbibliotheek, Cod. Or. 4732/1 (SCAL 15), fols. 1a–17b, in collaboration with Klaus-Dietrich Fischer. Brill, Leiden 2021. ISBN 978-90-04-45913-7
- Glossaris medicobotànics multilingües de l’edat mitjana en grafia hebrea, in Sabers per als laics. Vernacularització, formació, transmissió (Corona d’Aragó, 1250–1600), ed. by Isabel Müller and Frank Savelsberg, Berlin 2021, 19–41, in collaboration with Guido Mensching.

c) Jewish physicians and translators of the Middle Ages

- R. Moshe Narboni, Philosopher and Physician. A Critical Analysis of Sefer Oraḥ Ḥayyim, Medieval Encounters 2.1 (1995): 219–251.
- Maimonides’ Medical Works and their Contribution to his Medical Biography, Maimonidean Studies 5 (2008): 243–266.
- Medical Terminology in the Hebrew Tradition. Shem Tov Ben Isaac, Sefer ha-Shimmush, Book 30, Journal of Semitic Studies 55.1 (2010): 53–101
- Medical Terminology in the Hebrew Tradition. Nathan Ben Eliezer ha-Me’ati, Glossary to the Hebrew translation of Ibn Sīnā’s K. al-Qānūn fī al-ṭibb, Revue des Études Juives 173. 3–4 (2013): 305–321.

d) Reception of Galen in the Middle Ages

- The Reception of Galen in Maimonides’ Medical Aphorisms, in The Unknown Galen, ed. V. Nutton, London 2002, 139–152.
- Pseudo-Galen, Al-Adwiya ’l-maktuma, with the commentary of Hunayn ibn Ishaq, Suhayl 6 (2006): 81–112, in collaboration with Y. Tzvi Langermann.
- The Introduction of Sergius of Resh‘aina to Galen’s Commentary on Hippocrates’ On Nutriment, Journal of Semitic Studies 54.1 (2009): 179–204, in collaboration with Y. Tzvi Langermann.
- The Alexandrian Summaries of Galen’s On Critical Days. Editions and translations of the two versions of the Jawāmiʿ, with Introduction and Notes, in collaboration with Y. Tzvi Langermann. Brill. Leiden 2014. ISBN 978-90-04-28221-6
- An Epitome of Galen’s On the Elements, Ascribed to Hunayn Ibn Ishaq, Arabic Sciences and Philosophy 25 (2015): 33–78, in collaboration with Y. Tzvi Langermann.

e) Sefer ha-Zohar: Book of Splendor

- Neologisms and Interpretations in the Sefer ha-Zohar, Kabbalah: Journal for the Study of Jewish Mystical Texts 55 (2022): 119-132.
- Neologisms and Other Difficult Terms in the Sefer ha-Zohar: Novel Interpretations II, Kabbalah: Journal for the Study of Jewish Mystical Texts 56 (2023): 169-179.
- Neologisms and Other Difficult Terms in the Sefer ha-Zohar: Novel Interpretations III, Kabbalah: Journal for the Study of Jewish Mystical Texts 57 (2024): 35-58.
- Neologisms and Other Difficult Terms in the Sefer ha-Zohar: Novel Interpretations IV, Kabbalah: Journal for the Study of Jewish Mystical Texts 58 (2024): 7-24.
- Neologisms and Other Difficult Terms in the Sefer ha-Zohar: Novel Interpretations V, Kabbalah: Journal for the Study of Jewish Mystical Texts 59 (2025): 109-180.
- Neologisms and Other Difficult Terms in the Sefer ha-Zohar: Novel Interpretations VI, Kabbalah: Journal for the Study of Jewish Mystical Texts 60 (2025): 41-80.

f) Various topics of medieval Jewish-Islamic popular science

- Hayyim Vital’s Kabbalah Ma‘asit we-Alkhimiyah (Practical Kabbalah and Alchemy), a Seventeenth Century ‘Book of Secrets, Journal of Jewish Thought and Philosophy 4 (1994): 55–112.
- Jewish Traditions on Strengthening Memory and Leone Modena’s Evaluation, Jewish Studies Quarterly 2.1 (1995): 39–58.
- Jewish Traditions on Magic with Birds (Ornithomancy), (2015, online).
