= Aptowitzer =

Aptowitzer is a surname. Notable people with the surname include:

- Avigdor Aptowitzer (1871–1942), Rabbinic scholar
- Walter Arlen (né Aptowitzer; 1920–2023), Austrian-born American composer
