= Vítor José =

Vítor José is a Portuguese given name. Some people with this name include:

- Vítor José da Silva Fernandes (1980–2021), Portuguese drag queen, singer, and makeup artist
- Vítor José Joaquim Pereira, Portuguese footballer
- Vítor José Campos (1944–2019), Portuguese footballer

== See also ==
- Zé Vitor, several people
