= Jonathan David (disambiguation) =

Jonathan David (born 2000) is a Canadian soccer player.

Jonathan David may also refer to:

- Jonathan David (singer) (born 1978), American musician
- "Jonathan David" (song), 2001 song by Belle and Sebastian
- Yonasan David, rabbi and rosh yeshiva

== See also ==
- David and Jonathan, heroic figures of ancient Israel
- Jonathan David Brown (1955–2016), American record producer and audio engineer
- Jonathan David Gómez (born 1989), Argentine footballer
- Jonathan David Katz (born 1958), American activist, art historian, educator and writer
- Jonathan David Victor (born 1954), American neuroscientist
