= Mordecai Yoffe =

Bohemian rabbi (c. 1530 – 1612)

Personal life
- Born: c. 1530 Prague, Bohemia
- Died: 7 March 1612 Posen, Poland

Religious life
- Religion: Judaism

Mordecai ben Avraham Yoffe (or Jaffe or Joffe) (c. 1530 – 7 March 1612; Hebrew: מרדכי בן אברהם יפה) was a rabbi, rosh yeshiva and posek. He is best known as author of Levush Malkhus, a ten-volume codification of Jewish law that particularly stressed the customs of the Jews of Eastern Europe. He is known as "the Levush" or "the Ba'al HaLevushim", for this work.

== Biography ==
Yoffe was born in Prague. He belonged to the Jaffe family, and as such was descended from Rashi, and thus, reputedly descended from Hillel the Elder and King David. His father, Abraham b. Joseph, was a pupil of Abraham ben Abigdor.

Yoffe studied under Moses Isserles and Solomon Luria; Mattithiah ben Solomon Delacrut was his teacher in Kabbalah. Yoffe also studied philosophy, astronomy, and mathematics (apparently at the insistence of Isserles).

He was Rosh Yeshiva in Prague until 1561, when, by order of Emperor Ferdinand, the Jews were expelled from Bohemia. Yoffe then went to Venice and studied astronomy (1561–71). There is a dispute regarding the sequence of his rabbinic pulpits. According to some in 1572 he was elected rabbi of Grodno; in 1588, rabbi of Lublin, where he became one of the leaders of the Council of Four Lands. Later Yoffe accepted the rabbinate of Kremenetz. In 1592 he was called as rabbi to Prague; from 1599 until his death he occupied the position of chief rabbi of Posen. Others place him first in Grodno, then, in 1587 in Kremenetz, 1590 in Lublin, Prague in 1592, and, in 1596, he switched rabbinic positions with Rabbi Judah Loew (Maharal of Prague), and moved to Posen and died there in 1612.

In addition to his Torah study, writing and teaching he was involved with communal needs, and attended the fairs at Yaroslav and Lublin, where community leaders and rabbis from large communities met to discuss matters of general interest. These meetings were the forerunners of the Council of the Four Lands and the Council of Lithuania.

A different Rabbi Mordecai Yoffe – Mordecai ben Moses Yoffe – is known for the controversy over his 1549 appointment as rabbi of Grodno, which had to be settled by Queen Bona, and eventually led the Lithuanian government to formalize many of the procedures of the Jewish community.

== Works ==
Levush Malkhus (Hebrew: לבוש מלכות, lit. 'Robes of Royalty') is a work of practical halacha, accompanied by the reasons behind the various halachic decisions according to logic and earlier sources, and includes sections on Torah commentary, philosophy, and mysticism. This work was divided into ten sections known as "levushim" (garments, or "attires").

While still in his youth, Rabbi Yoffe had the idea to compile a book on Jewish law, which would be used for making halachic decisions. The appearance of R' Yosef Caro's Shulchan Arukh, a digest of his Beit Yosef, led Rabbi Yoffe to consider whether he should continue writing his own work. On reflection, he concluded that there was room for it since it would contain "those laws observed by the Ashkenazi Jews of Bohemia." When R' Moshe Isserles' gloss to the Shulḥan Arukh (called Mappah) appeared in Cracow in 1578, Rabbi Yoffe felt that Rabbi Isserles had been too brief as had Rav Yosef Caro in the Shulḥan Arukh, and decided to resume his original work, "that will be midway between the two extremes: the lengthy Beit Yosef of Caro on the one hand, and on the other Rav Yosef Caro's Shulḥan Arukh together with the Mappah of Rabbi Isserles, which is too brief." In all, Rabbi Yoffe worked on this book almost 50 years. However, after completing his book he was confronted by another Rabbi who had also written a similar work, although not as extensive as Rabbi Yoffe's. They reached an agreement to publish Rabbi Yoffe's book and to present the other Rabbi's additional comments in glosses (hagahos) throughout the book.

The work is organised as follows. The first five "attires" are devoted to the laws expounded in Rav Yosef Caro's Beit Yosef; the sixth, Ha-Orah is an elucidation of Rashi's biblical commentary; the seventh, Simḥah ve-Sason, contains sermons for holidays and weddings. Rabbi Yoffe collectively termed the last three, "rabbinic robes," considering that these should be learned by "every student in that order – philosophy, astronomy, and Kabbalah." These are: the eighth, Pinnat Yikrat, is a commentary on Maimonides' Guide of the Perplexed; the ninth, Eder Yakar, is a commentary on the laws of the Jewish calendar according to Maimonides and an additional commentary on Abraham bar Hiyya's geographical-astronomical Tzurat ha-Aretz; the tenth, Even Yikrat, is on Menahem Recanati's commentary on the Torah.

The Levush is an exception among the codifiers in treating ritual-legal matters from a kabbalistic standpoint; his approach, to a certain extent, "tended to draw together the Talmudists and kabbalists, otherwise in danger of an open breach".
