= Polish Resettlement Act 1947 =

Act of the Parliament of the United Kingdom

Polish Resettlement Act 1947 (Note: Section 13.)
- Act of Parliament
- Parliament of the United Kingdom
- Long title: An Act to provide for the application of the Royal Warrant as to pensions, etc., for the military forces to certain Polish forces, to enable the Assistance Board to meet the needs of, and to provide accommodation in camps or other establishments for, certain Poles and others associated with Polish forces, to provide for their requirements as respects health and educational services, to provide for making arrangements and meeting expenses in connection with their emigration, to modify as respects the Polish resettlement forces and past members of certain Polish forces provisions relating to the service of aliens in the forces of the Crown, to provide for the discipline and internal administration of certain Polish forces and to affirm the operation up to the passing of this Act of provision previously made therefor, and for purposes connected therewith and consequential thereon.
- Citation: 10 & 11 Geo. 6. c. 19
- Territorial extent: United Kingdom

Dates
- Royal assent: 27 March 1947
- Commencement: 27 March 1947 (Note: The Acts of Parliament (Commencement) Act 1793.)
Other legislation
Amended by	National Assistance Act 1948; National Assistance (Adaptation of Enactments) Regulations 1950; Statute Law Revision Act 1953; Ministry of Social Security Act 1966; National Health Service (Scotland) Act 1972; National Health Service Reorganisation Act 1973; Supplementary Benefits Act 1976; National Health Service Act 1977; Naval, Military and Air Forces etc. (Modification of Enactments and other Instruments) Order 1978; Social Security Act 1980; Mental Health Act 1983; Health Authorities Act 1995; Statute Law (Repeals) Act 2004; Civil Partnership Act 2004; Mental Health (Care and Treatment) (Scotland) Act 2003 (Modification of Enactments) Order 2005; National Health Service (Consequential Provisions) Act 2006; Statute Law (Repeals) Act 2008; Pensions Act 2008

Status: Amended

History of passage through Parliament

Text of statute as originally enacted

Text of the Polish Resettlement Act 1947 as in force today (including any amendments) within the United Kingdom, from legislation.gov.uk.

The Polish Resettlement Act 1947 (10 & 11 Geo. 6. c. 19) is an act of the Parliament of the United Kingdom. The act was the first ever mass immigration legislation, and offered British citizenship to over 250,000 displaced Polish troops on British soil who had fought against Nazi Germany and opposed the Soviet takeover of their homeland. The act also supplied a labour force to the demands of war-torn Britain.

== Background ==
The Polish contribution to World War II was outstanding, and directly led to the Polish Resettlement Act 1947 and the formation of the Polish British community as it exists today.

In advance of the war, the Polish Cypher Bureau broke the early version of the Enigma machine and gave their knowledge to the British, forming the basis for British cryptographic breakthroughs that produced the Ultra intelligence that was a key factor in many Allied successes during the war.

The majority of Poles came to the United Kingdom to help the Allied war effort after the Nazi occupation of Poland in 1939. By 1940, with the fall of France, the Polish President, Prime Minister and the Polish government in exile transferred to London, along with a first wave of at least 20,000 soldiers and airmen. Thousands more followed throughout the war.

Poles formed the fourth-largest Allied armed force in Europe after the Red Army, the United States Army and the combined troops of the British Empire. Poles were the largest group of non-British personnel in the RAF during the Battle of Britain. Special Operations Executive had a large section of covert, elite Polish troops and close cooperation with the Polish resistance. The Polish Army under British high command participated in the Battle of Monte Cassino, the Battle of the Falaise Gap, the Battle of Arnhem, the Siege of Tobruk and the liberation of many European cities including Bologna and Breda.

By July 1945, 228,000 troops of the Polish Armed Forces in the West were serving under the high command of the British Army. Many of these men and women were originally from the Kresy region of eastern Poland including cities such as Lwów and Wilno. They had been deported from Kresy to the Soviet gulags when the Soviet Union and Nazi Germany occupied Poland in 1939 in accordance with the Nazi-Soviet Pact. When two years later Churchill and Stalin formed an alliance against Hitler, the Kresy Poles were released from the Gulags in Siberia, formed the Anders Army and marched to Persia to create the II Corps (Poland) under British high command.

== Yalta ==
The Polish II Corps was instrumental in the Allied defeat of the Germans in North Africa and Italy, and its members hoped to return to Kresy in an independent and democratic Poland at the end of the War. But at Yalta, Churchill agreed Stalin should keep the Soviet gains that Adolf Hitler had endorsed in the Nazi-Soviet Pact, including Kresy, and carry out Polish population transfers. Consequently, Churchill had agreed that tens of thousands of veteran Polish troops under British command should lose their Kresy homes to the Soviet Union, with the implication that relatives including wives and children would be at the mercy of the NKVD. In reaction, thirty officers and men from the II Corps (Poland) committed suicide.

Churchill explained his actions in a three-day parliamentary debate starting 27 February 1945, which ended in a vote of confidence. Many MPs openly criticised Churchill over Yalta and voiced strong loyalty to Britain's Polish allies. Some reporters felt Churchill was not confident Poland would be the independent and democratic country Polish troops could return to, because the prime minister also said: 'His Majesty's Government will never forget the debt they owe to the Polish troops... I earnestly hope it will be possible for them to have citizenship and freedom of the British empire, if they so desire.'

During the debate, 25 MPs risked their careers to draft an amendment protesting against Britain's tacit acceptance of Poland's domination by the Soviet Union. These members included Arthur Greenwood; Sir Archibald Southby; Alec Douglas-Home; Lord Willoughby de Eresby and Victor Raikes. After the failure of the amendment, Henry Strauss, the Parliamentary Secretary to the Ministry of Town and Country, resigned from the government in protest at the British treatment of Poland.

== Legislation ==
When the Second World War ended, Joseph Stalin reneged on his Yalta promises and a Communist government was installed in Poland. Still, the British government wanted to maintain cordial relations with Stalin, and so tried to persuade Poles in the UK to leave. Most Poles felt betrayed by their wartime allies. They refused to return to Poland, because of a range of reasons: the Soviet repression of Polish citizens, Soviet conduct around the 1944 Warsaw Uprising, the Trial of the Sixteen and other executions of pro-democracy Poles such as former members of the Home Army including Emil Fieldorf and Witold Pilecki, and finally, the creation of the Eastern Bloc.

The result was the Polish Resettlement Act 1947, Britain's first mass immigration law.

Large numbers of Poles, after occupying resettlement camps of the Polish Resettlement Corps, later settled in London, and industrial areas of the North, while many other Poles were recruited as European Volunteer Workers. Others settled in the British Empire, forming large Polish Canadian and Polish Australian communities.

In the 1951 Census, the Polish-born population of the UK numbered some 162,339, up from 44,642 in 1931.

At the same time, Britain's social and economic areas had been hard hit by the Second World War, and to rebuild itself physically and financially it required a workforce to do it quickly and effectively. The Polish Resettlement Act enabled Poles to settle in Britain and provide labour. They formed much of the Polish British community as it existed prior to Poland's accession to the European Union in 2004, and any immigration to Britain which followed.

== See also ==
- Polish British
- Western betrayal
- Federation of Poles in Great Britain
- World War II Behind Closed Doors: Stalin, the Nazis and the West
