= Wiktor Andrzej Moszczyński =

Wiktor Andrzej Moszczyński (born 6 September 1946) is a British-Polish journalist, political activist, and author. He is the recipient of Polish Golden Order of Merit (1992), Bene Merito honorary badge (2010), and Commander's Cross of the Order of Merit (2014). He was the chairman of Polish Solidarity Campaign in 1982–83. He served as a councillor in Ealing Borough Council from 1986 to 1990. and previously in 1979–80 in Ipswich Borough Council. Married in 1972 to Albina Drabik; one son, Sandro Marcus Moszczynski, born in 1990.

He was the vice chairman of the Federation of Poles in Great Britain and in 1992 campaigned to abolish visas for Poles in the UK.

From 1994-to 2001, Moszczyński was the editor-in-chief of a Polish emigre journal, Orzeł Biały.

== Early life and education ==
Moszczyński was born and brought up in London to Polish refugees Henryk Moszczyński and Anna Barbara (née Madejewska). In 1965, Moszczyński graduated from the Gunnersbury Boys' School at Brentford. In 1968, he graduated from the University of Sussex in Brighton with honours in the School of Social Studies, majoring in International Relations.

== Career ==
From 1980 to 1986, he was active in the executive committee of the Polish Solidarity Campaign (PSC) and became its chairman in 1982.

In the 1983 parliamentary elections, he was the Labour party candidate in Bury St Edmunds, in the 1984 elections to the European Assembly he was the Labour Party candidate for Suffolk and South East Cambridgeshire, and in the 2006 and 2010 Ealing London Borough Council election.

From 1991 to 1993 he served as vice-president to the Federation of Poles in Great Britain, and from 1997 to 2009 as their Press Spokesman and member of the Executive; he was responsible for promoting Polish issues with the UK government and the UK press.

In 2016, Wiktor Moszczynski, on behalf of FPGB filed a complaint to the European Court relating specifically to The Times Columnist Giles Coren's use of the word "Polack," which he claims has a pejorative meaning, and he ran a successful complaint to the Press Complaints Commission about the consistent negative coverage of the Polish community in the UK by the Daily Mail.

== Books ==
- Hello, I'm Your Polish Neighbour: All about Poles in West London (2010)
- Polak Londynczyk (A Polish Londoner) (2011)
- Ogłaszam alarm dla polskiego Londynu (2019)
- In the Shadow of the Cross, translation from Polish book by Jozef Mackiewicz (1973)
- Chasing Phileas Fogg: 80 Days on the Borealis (2023) (9)

== See also ==
- Polish Solidarity Campaign
- Federation of Poles in Great Britain
