= James Victor =

Jim or James Victor may refer to:

- James Conway Victor (1792–1864), British Army major general
- James Victor (actor) (1939–2016), Dominican-born American actor
- Jim Victor (1946–2018), American racecar driver (List of driver deaths in motorsport)
- James Victor (cycling) (born 1962), Australian cycling coach

== See also ==
- Jamie Victory (born 1975), English footballer from 1994 to 2008
