= Avigdor (name) =

Avigdor (Hebrew: אביגדור, also Abigdor, Awigdor, from I Chronicles 4.18, אבי גדור = Avi Gedor) is a Hebrew masculine given name.

== Given name ==
- Avigdor Aptowitzer (1871–1942), Austrian rabbi
- Avigdor Arikha (1929–2010), Israeli-French painter, printmaker, and art historian
- Avigdor Ben-Gal (1936–2016), Israeli general
- Abigdor Cohen of Vienna (fl. 13th century), Austrian Talmudist
- Avigdor Dagan (1912–2006), also known as Viktor Fischl, Israeli writer, playwright and diplomat
- Avigdor Eskin, Russian-Israeli political activist
- Avigdor Glogauer (c. 1725–1810), German grammarian and poet
- Avigdor Kara (died 1439), chief rabbi of Prague, poet and mystic
- Avigdor Kahalani, Israeli soldier and politician
- Avigdor Lieberman, Israeli politician, leader of the Yisrael Beiteinu party
- Avigdor "Avi" Maoz (born 1956), Israeli politician
- Avigdor Miller (1908–2001), American rabbi, author and lecturer
- Avigdor Moskowitz (born 1953), Israeli basketball player
- Avigdor Nebenzahl, former chief rabbi of the Old City of Jerusalem
- Avigdor Stematsky (1908–1989), Israeli painter
- Avigdor Yitzhaki (1949–2025), Israeli politician, member of the Knesset for Kadima

== Surname ==
- Avigdor family (or d'Avigdor), Italian-French and later German and British Jewish pedigree; (de)
- Abraham Abigdor (born 1350), French-Jewish physician, philosopher, and translator
- Isaac C. Avigdor (1920–2010), rabbi, son of Jacob Avigdor
- Jacob Avigdor (1896–1967), also known as Yaakov Avigdor, author and rabbi in Poland and Mexico
- Solomon Avigdor (born 1384), French-Jewish translator of Hebrew

== See also ==
- Names of Moses
- Victor (name)
- Henry d'Avigdor-Goldsmid
- James d'Avigdor-Goldsmid
