= Vítor Bruno =

Vítor Bruno may refer to:

- Vítor Bruno (football manager) (born 1982), Portuguese football manager
- Vítor Bruno (footballer, born 1990), Portuguese footballer
