= Vítor Pereira =

Vítor Pereira may refer to:

- Vítor Pereira (footballer, born 1953), Portuguese former football midfielder
- Vítor Pereira (footballer, born 1968), Portuguese former football midfielder and manager
- Vítor Pereira (footballer, born 1978), Portuguese former football midfielder and manager
- Vítor Pereira (footballer, born 1985), Portuguese football defender
- Vítor Melo Pereira (born 1957), Portuguese former football referee
