= Victor Martin =

Victor Martin may refer to:

- Victor Martin (sociologist), Belgian sociologist and member of the Belgian Resistance
- Victor Martin (politician), Canadian politician
- Víctor Martín (swimmer), Spanish swimmer
- Víctor Martín (violinist), Spanish violinist
