= Vítor da Silva =

Vítor da Silva may also refer to:

- Vitor Benedito Leque da Silva (born 2001), Brazilian footballer
- Vitor Feijão (born Vitor Correia da Silva, 1996), Brazilian footballer
- Vítor Hugo da Silva (born 1963), Portuguese roller hockey player
- Vítor Manuel da Silva Caldeira (born 1960), Portuguese auditor
- Vítor Marcolino da Silva (1909–1982), Portuguese footballer
- Vítor Emanuel Cruz da Silva (born 1984), Portuguese footballer
