= Victor Ivaniv =

Russian poet and writer

- Born: Viktor Germanovich Ivanov (Виктор Германович Иванов); 11 April 1977; Novosibirsk, Russia, USSR
- Died: 25 February 2015 (aged 37); Novosibirsk, Russia
- Citizenship: USSR, Russia
- Education: Candidate of Philological Sciences
- Alma mater: Novosibirsk State University
- Occupations: poet, writer
- Writing career
- Language: Russian
- Notable awards: International Award in Honour of the Father of Russian Futurism David Burliuk (2003) The Andrei Bely Prize (2012)

Victor Ivaniv (real name — Ви́ктор Ге́рманович Ивано́в; 11 April 1977, Novosibirsk — 25 February 2015, same location) was a Russian poet and writer with a doctor of philosophy in philology.

== Biography ==
Ivaniv was born on 11 April 1977 in Novosibirsk, Russia.

He graduated from the Novosibirsk State University, and gained the title of Candidate of Philological Sciences. His dissertation topic was the poetry of the Russian Avant-Garde (“The Philosophical Concept and the Iconic Sign in the Poetry of the Russian Avant-Garde”). He worked as a librarian in the State Public Scientific and Technological Library of the Siberian Branch of the Russian Academy of Sciences. His works were published in the journals and almanacs Uralskaya Nov (Ural News), Sibirskie ogni (Siberian Lights), Vozdukh (Air), Chernovik (Scrapbook), Vavilon (Babylon), TextOnly, Тranslit, Russkaya proza (Russian Prose), ©oyuz Pisateley (Writers Union), Stetoskop (Stethoscope), Deti Ra (Children of Ra) and others, in the literary collections Vremya Ch (The Time of Ch), Chernym po Belomu (Black on White), in the anthology Nestolichnaya literatura (Non-Capital Literature). He lived in Novosibirsk.

He committed suicide on 25 February 2015 by jumping out of the window of his own flat.

== Recognition ==
- Shortlist in the Debyut (Debut) Prize, poetry category (2002).
- Mezdunarodnaya otmetina imeni otza russkogo futurizma Davida Burlyuka (International Award in Honour of the Father of Russian Futurism David Burliuk) (2003).
- The Andrei Bely Prize (2012), prose category (for the books Dnevnik nablyudenii (Diary of Observations) and Chumnoy Pokemar (Awake Dreamer).
- Diploma of the Мoskovskiy Schyot (The Moscow Score) Prize (2016) for the book Dom gruzchika (House of a Loader).

Describing her impression of the winners of the Debyut (Debut) Prize, the critic Lyudmila Vyazmitinova wrote about Ivaniv’s work:

“Ivaniv's texts seem to reproduce the multidirectional movements of many nested images born simultaneously in a saturated point in space, to which the author's gaze is directed. [...] But in all the texts, there is a desire for what Ivaniv himself has called "rising above the panorama" – this sets a certain vertical giving hope for a new horizon for a gaze that breaks through into a qualitatively new space of vision, sensation, and the ability to convey them - with a qualitatively differently organized community of words.”

== Remembering ==
In 2015, the online journal Kulturnaya Initziativa [kulturinfo.ru] published a short collection of poems dedicated to the passing of Victor Ivaniv.

In April 2017 in Novosibirsk, to coincide with the 40-year anniversary of the birth of Victor Ivaniv, the first Ivanivskie chteniya (“The Readings of Ivaniv”) took place.

The events took place at the State Public Scientific and Technological Library of the Siberian Branch of the Russian Academy of Sciences, where Ivaniv had been working in his later years. The readings were divided into two streams: the scientific one and the artistic one.

The following writers and literary scholars were the participants of “The Readings of Ivaniv” (both in person and online): Ainsley E. Morse (Boston, USA), Heinrich Jackson (Berlin, Germany), Sergei Biryukov (Halle, Germany), Anna Glazova (Hamburg, Germany), Aleksei Dyachkov (Moscow, Russia), Sergei Sokolovskiy (Moscow, Russia), Danila Davydov (Moscow, Russia), Vasily Borodin (Moscow, Russia), Lev Oborin (Moscow, Russia), Nikita Sugnatov (Moscow, Russia), Nikolay Kononov (Saint Petersburg, Russia), Alexei Porvin (Saint Petersburg, Russia), Stanislav Snytko (Saint Petersburg, Russia), Andrei Rodionov (Moscow, Russia), Aleksei A. Shepelev (Anapa, Russia), Aleksandr Zhitenev (Voronezh, Russia), Nataliya Sannikova (Chelyabinsk, Russia), Vladimir Bogomyakov (Tiumen, Russia), Yekaterina Boyarskikh (Irkutsk, Russia), Andrei Shevtsov (Tiumen, Russia), the Novosibirsk poets and literaries Ivan Poltoratskiy, Viktor Raspopin, Igor Silantyev, Andrei Zhdanov, Andrei Schetnikov, Svyatoslav Odarenko, Sergei Shuba, Dmitri Severov, Dmitri Gusev and others.

As part of the readings, the second volume of Victor Ivanivs selected prose Konetz Pokemarya (The End of the Pokemar) (Korovaknigi publishing house) was presented, as well as an exhibition of photographs by the artist Zosya Leutina.

In 2018 in Novosibirsk, a collection of works was published and curated by Sergei Vasilyev, titled The City of Ivaniv (Город Іванів). The collective works by various authors include poems dedicated to the memory of Ivaniv. The authors include Sergei Biryukov, Danila Davydov, Gali-Dana Singer, Oleg Yuriev, Aleksei A. Shepelyov, Mikhail Nemtzev, Andrei Rodionov, Aleksei Porvin and others.

In 2020, Aleksandr Zhitenev published an essay, Poetologiya Viktora Ivaniva [The Poetology of Victor Ivaniv], in the Litera Magazine.

== Publishing history ==
- Ivaniv, Victor (1994). Den Kosmonavtiki. Stikhotvoreniya [The Day of Cosmonautics. Poems] (in Russian). Novosibirsk: RITz Rassvet, p. 108.
- Ivaniv, Victor (2000). Sobytylnik Somnambuly: Poema [The Somnambulists Drinking Buddy] (in Russian). Novosibirsk: Artel Naprasnyi Trud, p. 12.
- Ivaniv, Victor (2003). Gorod Vinograd. Povest [The City of Vinograd. A Tale] (in Russian). Moscow: АRGO-RISK; Tver: KOLONNA Publications, p. 84 (Biblioteka molodoi literatury [The Library of Young Literature], ed. 23).
- Ivaniv, Victor (2005). Gorod Zaton [The City of Zaton] (in Russian). Moscow: Deti Ra, issue 3.
- Ivaniv, Victor (2006). Steklyannyi Chelovek i Zelenaya Plastinka: Stikhi [A Glass Man and a Green Vinyl Plate: Poems] (in Russian). Moscow: Raketa, p. 130.
- Ivaniv, Victor (2009). Vosstanie Gryoz. Povest [The Rise of Dreams. A Tale] (in Russian). Moscow, Кorovaknigi, p. 64 (shortlisted for the Andrei Bely Prize).
- Ivaniv, Victor (2011). Dnevnik nabliudenii [Diary of Observations] (in Russian). Moscow: Book review (ARGО-RISK), p. 80 (Book project of the journal Vozdukh: the Malaya Proza series, ed. 5)
- Ivaniv, Victor (2012). Chumnoi Pokemar: Sobranie Prozy [Awake Dreamer: A Collection of Prose] (in Russian). New York: Ailuros Publishing, p. 325.
- Ivaniv, Victor (2014). Povest o Polechke [A Tale About Polechka] (in Russian). Moscow, Korovaknigi, p. 40.
- Ivaniv, Victor (2014). Trupak i vrach Zarin [Trupak and Doctor Zarin] (in Russian). Moscow: Avtokhton, p. 44.
- Ivaniv, Victor (2015). Dom Gruzchika: Stikhi [The House of a Loader: Poems] (in Russian). Moscow: Novoe Literaturnoe Obozrenie, p. 312. (Novaya poeziya [New poetry]).
- Ivaniv, Victor (2015). Sebastian i v travme [Sebastian in Trauma] (in Russian). Moscow, Korovaknigi, p. 60.
- Ivaniv, Victor (2017). Konetz Pokemarya [The End of Pokemar] (in Russian). Moscow, Korovaknigi, p. 404.
- Ivaniv, Victor (2017). Sostoyavshiesya igry, na kotorykh ya prisutstvoval [Past Games I Attended] (in Russian). Moscow, Korovaknigi, p. 88.
- Ivaniv, Victor (2021). Stikhotvoreniya Op. 1-47 [Poems Op. 1-47] (in Russian). Moscow, Korovaknigi, p. 202. (Preparatory materials for the collection of works by Victor Ivaniv. Edition. 1).
- Ivaniv, Victor (2021). Korablik na prikole [Boat on a Leash]. Novosibirsk, p. 14 (The Sneg series).
- Ivaniv, Victor (2021). Corpora Corporationis, ili puteshestvie iz goroda Vinograd v gorod Anton [Corpora Corporationis, or Travel from the City of Vinograd to the City of Anton]. Moscow, Korovaknigi, p. 128. (Preparatory materials for the collection of works by Victor Ivaniv. Edition. 2).
- Ivaniv, Victor (2022). Stikhotvoreniya 2015 goda [Poems of 2015]. Moscow, Korovaknigi, p. 182. (Preparatory materials for the collection of works by Victor Ivaniv. Edition. 3)
