= Wiktor Kurnatowski =

Polish lithographer and conspirator

Wiktor Kurnatowski (?-1846) was an ethnic Polish lithographer and conspirator who lived in the Kingdom of Prussia. He fought in the November Uprising. In July 1841 Kurnatowski opened his own factory in Poznań. He was a member of the Polish Democratic Society. He is considered one of the most active conspirators of the 1840s in Greater Poland. He belonged to the "Committee for the Interests of the Military" together with S. Mielżyński and W. Kosiński. Kurnatowski was arrested during preparations for the Greater Poland Uprising.

== Bibliography ==
- Gąsiorowski, Antoni.; Knopek, Bożena.; Zielińska, Maria (1981). Wielkopolski Słownik Biograficzn. Warszawa: Państwowe Wydawn. Nauk. pp. 394–395. ISBN 83-01-02722-3.
