= Vítor Baptista (disambiguation) =

Vítor Baptista (1948–1999) was a Portuguese footballer.

Vítor Baptista may also refer to:

- Vítor Baptista (footballer, born 1920) (1920–2008), Portuguese footballer
- Vitor Baptista (racing driver) (born 1998), Brazilian racing driver
