= João Vítor (footballer, born 1987) =

Swiss footballer (born 1987)

Personal information
- Full name: João Vítor Albano Manuel
- Date of birth: September 13, 1987 (age 39)
- Place of birth: Sierre, Switzerland
- Height: 1.69 m (5 ft 6 1/2 in)
- Position: Defender

Team information
- Current team: Lagoa

Senior career*
Years	Team	Apps	(Gls)
2006–2009	Portimonense	15	(1)
2009–	Lagoa	15	(0)
- * Club domestic league appearances and goals as of 19:25, 18 February 2010 (UTC)

João Vítor Albano Manuel (born 13 September 1987) is a Swiss footballer. He currently plays as a defender in the Portuguese Second Division for G.D. Lagoa.

== Career ==
Manuel previously played for Liga de Honra side Portimonense. Manuel started his career at the youth level. He enjoyed some success and eventually joined the first team in the 2006/07 season, where he played 10 games. However, since that season, he has had limited chances, making only 3 appearances in that time.
