= Vitor Gabriel =

Vitor Gabriel may refer to:

- Vitor Gabriel (footballer, born 1997), Brazilian football midfielder who plays for Académica de Coimbra
- Vitor Gabriel (footballer, born 2000), Brazilian football forward who plays for Gangwon FC
- Vitor Gabriel (footballer, born 2006), Brazilian football defender who plays for Atlético Mineiro

== See also ==
- Victor Gabriel (born 2004), Brazilian football defender who plays for Internacional
