= Vítor Almeida =

Pedro Almeida may refer to:

- Vítor Almeida (runner) (born 1970), Portuguese middle-distance runner
- Vítor Almeida (footballer) (born 1991), Portuguese footballer who plays as a defender
