= Vítor Costa =

Vítor Costa may refer to:

- Vítor Costa (hammer thrower) (born 1974), Portuguese hammer thrower
- Vítor Costa (footballer) (born 1994), Brazilian footballer
