= Federation of Poles in Great Britain =

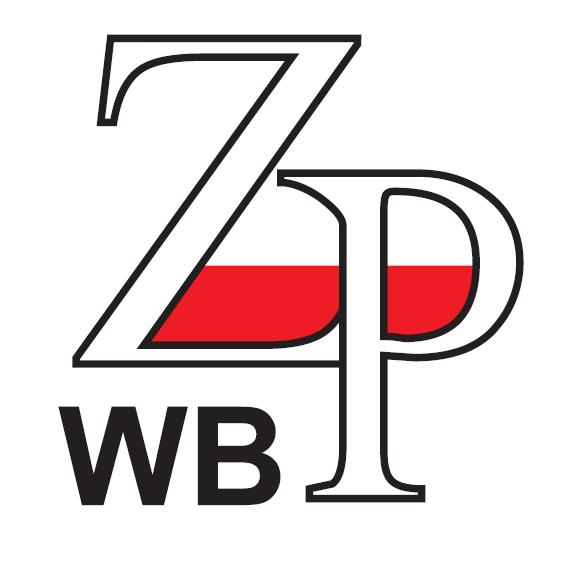
- Formation: 1946
- Headquarters: London, United Kingdom
- President: Alicja Donimirska
- Website: www.zpwb.org.uk

The Federation of Poles in Great Britain (Polish: Zjednoczenie Polskie w Wielkiej Brytanii) is a voluntary umbrella organisation established to promote the interests of Poles in the United Kingdom and to promote the history and culture of Poland among British people. As a charity the Federation's statutes contain detailed information about its objectives and responsibilities.

== History ==
The Federation of Poles in Great Britain (FPGB) was formed in 1946, when the British Government formally withdrew recognition of the Polish Government in Exile, rendering many Poles in Britain effectively stateless. They were however granted special leave to remain under the provisions of the Polish Resettlement Act 1947. From that time until 1990, the Federation represented the interests of Polish settlers in relation to the United Kingdom authorities.

Following the emergence in 1990 of Poland as a state no longer within the Soviet bloc, its Presidential Insignia, kept until then in London, were ceremonially transferred by President Ryszard Kaczorowski to President Lech Wałęsa in Warsaw. At that juncture certain responsibilities remained vested in The Federation. The Federation became recognised by both Polish and British governments, along with other Polish organisations worldwide, as the organisation representing the Polish minority in Great Britain.

== Activities within its remit ==
In 2008, the Federation spokesman, Wiktor Moszczynski, submitted a complaint to the Press Complaints Commission over claims that the Daily Mail had run a series of articles defamatory to Poles. The PCC arranged a compromise between the Federation and the Daily Mail, whereby the Daily Mail promised to remove the offending articles from their website.

== Membership ==
The Federation was originally set up to bring together the various Polish organisations across Great Britain. Subsequently, a change in the statutes introduced Individual Membership. This has opened membership to Poles permanently resident in Great Britain, members of their families, people of Polish heritage and anyone else supporting the aims of The Federation.

== See also ==
- Poles in the United Kingdom
- Polonia
- Poles
