= Aglailson Victor =

Brazilian politician (born 1995)

Member of the Legislative Assembly of Pernambuco
- Incumbent
- Assumed office 1 February 2023

Personal details
- Born: 27 July 1995 (age 31)
- Party: PSD
- Parent: Aglailson Júnior (father)

Victor Moraes Queralvares Glaser, better known as Aglailson Victor (born 27 July 1995), is a Brazilian politician serving as a member of the Legislative Assembly of Pernambuco since 2023. He is the son of Aglailson Júnior.
