= Wiktor Nilsson =

Swedish ice hockey player

- Born: January 20, 2002 (age 24) Vendelsö, Sweden
- Height: 184 cm (6 ft 0 in)
- Weight: 79 kg (174 lb; 12 st 6 lb)
- Position: Forward
- Shoots: Right
- Liiga team Former teams: Oulun Kärpät; Djurgårdens IF; Leksands IF
- Playing career: 2020–present

Wiktor Nilsson (born January 20, 2002) is a Swedish professional ice hockey forward currently playing for Oulun Kärpät of the Finnish Liiga.

== Playing career ==
Nilsson began his youth career with Nynäshamns IF and Nacka HK and represented Stockholm Syd (Stockholm's southern district) at the 2017 TV-pucken, where he recorded one goal and one assist in six games, helping the team win a bronze medal. In 2018, Nilsson joined Djurgårdens IF to play junior hockey. He made his professional debut with Djurgården in the Swedish Hockey League (SHL) during the 2020–21, appearing in 13 games. During the 2021–22, Nilsson played in eight SHL games but primarily played junior ice hockey in the J20 league, where he had a breakout season, tallying twelve goals and 24 assists for a total of 36 points in 33 games. In the J20 playoffs, Djurgården reached the Anton Cup final, losing to Linköping HC and earning Nilsson and the team a silver medal. Djurgården's men's team was relegated to the second-tier HockeyAllsvenskan for the 2022–23, where Nilsson played his first full season at the senior level, scoring 15 goals and seven assists for a total of 22 points in 51 games. During the 2023–24, Nilsson increased his point total to 39, with 14 goals and 25 assists. In the playoffs, competing for promotion to the top-tier SHL, Djurgården reached the best-of-seven final against Brynäs IF. In game three of the finals, Nilsson delivered an illegal hit to Brynäs' Simon Bertilsson only twelve seconds into the game, receiving a match penalty and a subsequent five-game suspension, which caused him to miss the rest of the finals. Djurgården ultimately lost the series 4–0 to Brynäs, who earned promotion to the SHL.

After establishing himself as a productive forward in HockeyAllsvenskan, Nilsson signed a two-year contract with Frölunda HC in the SHL before the 2024–25.

== Career statistics ==
| | | | Regular season | | | | | Playoffs |
| Season | Team | League | GP | G | A | Pts | PIM | GP | G | A | Pts | PIM |
|---|---|---|---|---|---|---|---|---|---|---|---|---|
| 2019–20 | Djurgårdens IF | J20 | 15 | 2 | 1 | 3 | 10 | — | — | — | — | — |
| 2020–21 | Djurgårdens IF | J20 | 11 | 0 | 7 | 7 | 4 | — | — | — | — | — |
| 2020–21 | Djurgårdens IF | SHL | 13 | 0 | 0 | 0 | 0 | — | — | — | — | — |
| 2021–22 | Djurgårdens IF | J20 | 33 | 12 | 24 | 36 | 26 | 6 | 1 | 0 | 1 | 4 |
| 2021–22 | Djurgårdens IF | SHL | 8 | 0 | 0 | 0 | 0 | — | — | — | — | — |
| 2022–23 | Djurgårdens IF | Allsv | 51 | 15 | 7 | 22 | 51 | 17 | 1 | 6 | 7 | 31 |
| 2023–24 | Djurgårdens IF | Allsv | 51 | 14 | 25 | 39 | 20 | 13 | 2 | 3 | 5 | 25 |
| 2024–25 | Frölunda HC | SHL | 32 | 2 | 4 | 6 | 35 | 2 | 0 | 0 | 0 | 0 |
| SHL totals | | | 53 | 2 | 4 | 6 | 35 | 2 | 0 | 0 | 0 | 0 |
