= Saint Victorian =

Saint Victorian(us) may refer to:

- Victorian, Frumentius and Companions, 5th-century North African martyrs
- Victorian of Asan, 6th-century Spanish saint
