= Viktor Kokosov =

Russian journalist and writer (born 1963)

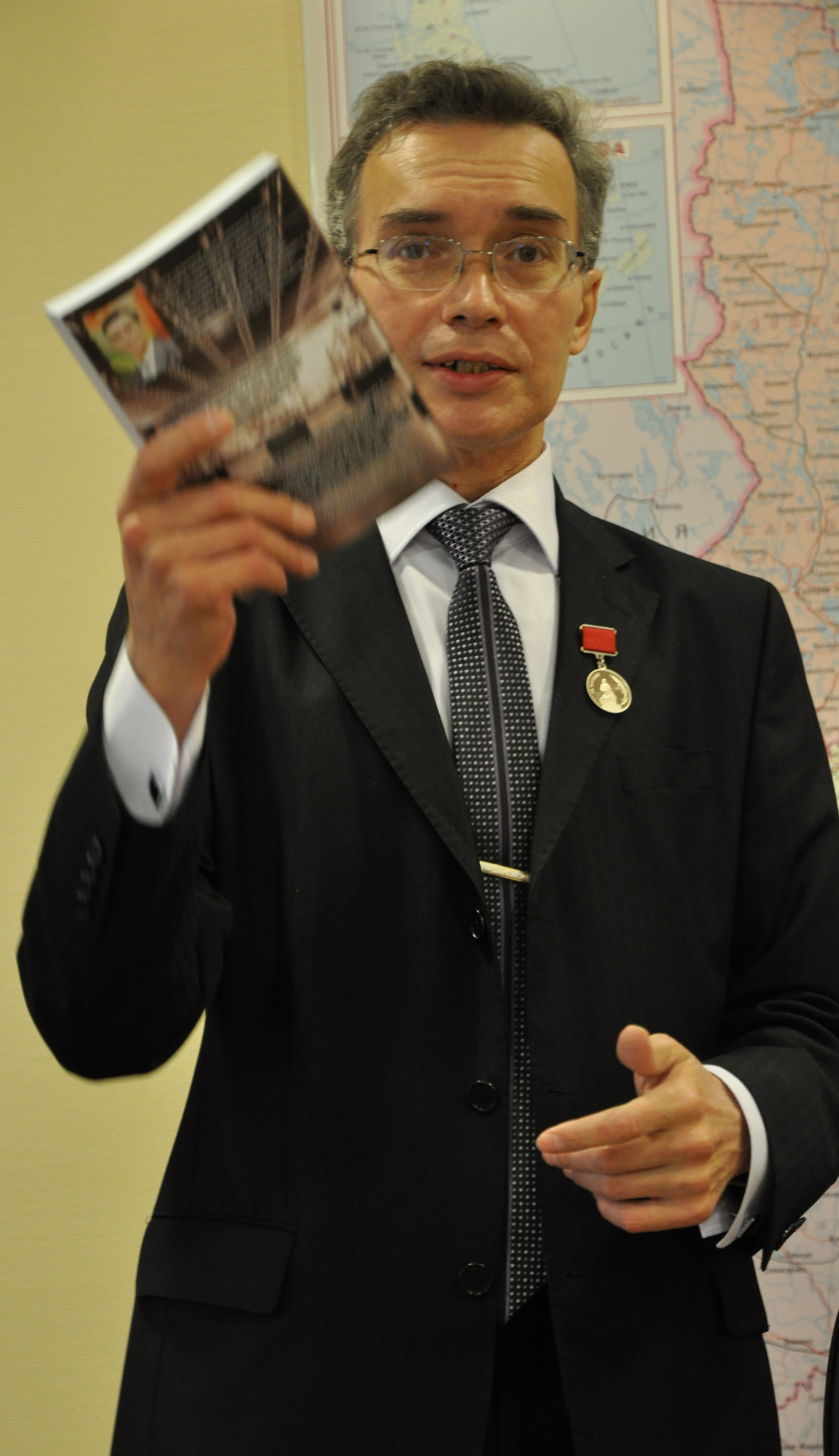
Viktor Nikolaevich Kokosov, 2013

Viktor Nikolaevich Kokosov (born 1963, Leningrad, USSR) is a Russian journalist and writer. Member of the Russian Union of Writers. Full member of the Russian Geographical Society. Member of the Public Council under the MOI of Russia in the Northwestern Federal District.

Silver winner of the National Literary Golden Pen of Russia Prize and the winner of the All-Russian Aleksey Konstantinovich Tolstoy Literary Award.

Great-grandson of the Russian writer Vladimir Jakovlyevich Kokosov's.
