= Wiktor Zygmunt Przedpełski =

Polish socialist and independence activist

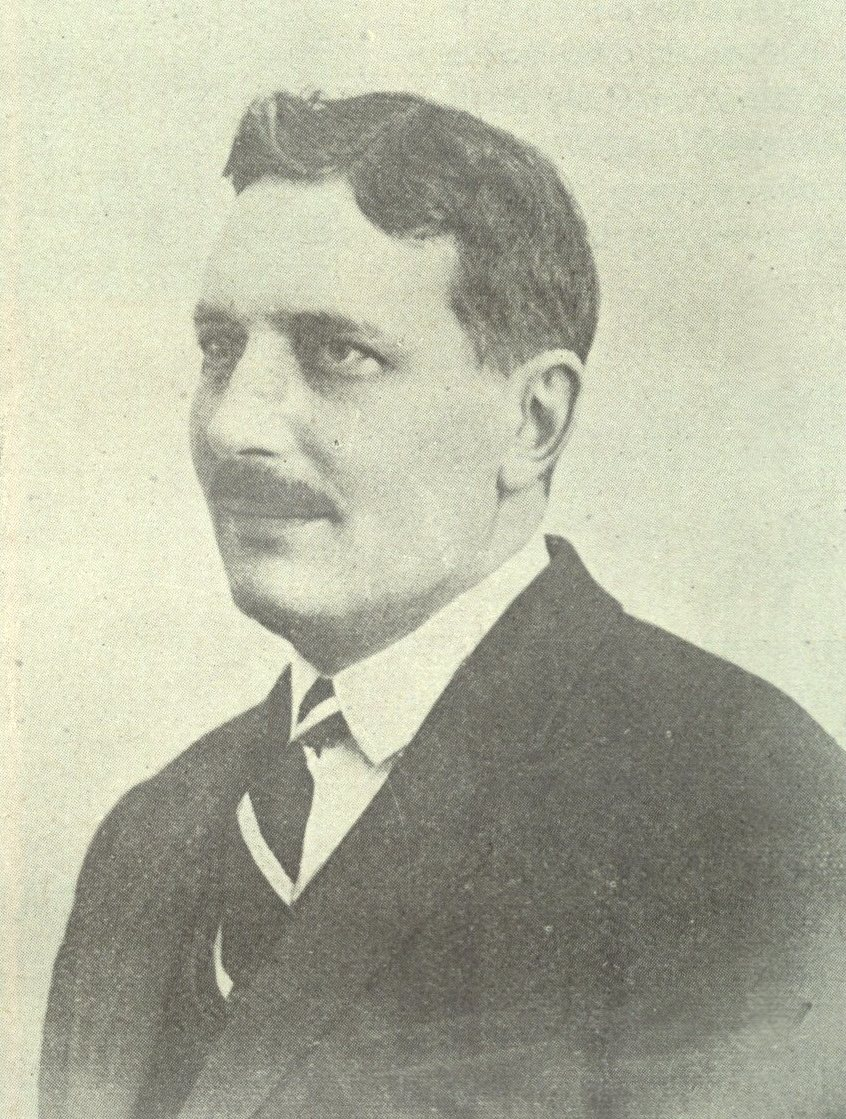

Member of Sejm

Personal details
- Born: 3 June 1891; Krasne, Masovian Voivodeship
- Died: 5 August 1941 (aged 50); New York, NY
- Political party: Nonpartisan Bloc for Cooperation with the Government

Wiktor Zygmunt Przedpełski (born 2 or 3 June 1891, Krasne (Przasnysz County), died 5 August 1941, New York) was a Polish socialist and independence activist, member of the Sejm.

== Life ==
In 1908 he passed his final exams at the Real School of Witold Wróbleski in Warsaw, after which he joined the Faculty of Chemistry at the Lviv Polytechnic, where in 1924 he obtained the title of engineer.

After 1907, Przedpełski belonged to the PPS-Left. In 1914 he was arrested in the Kingdom of Poland and deported to the Tobol Province. In the years 1917-1919 he was active in the Polish independence movement in Russia. In 1919, he returned from exile and fought as a volunteer in the Defense of Lwów, where he earned a number of military distinctions. In January 1920 he became the president of the board of the Brotherly Help (Bratnia Pomoc) at the Polytechnic in Lviv. He co-organized the Polish Military Organization in Upper Silesia, and participated in the Silesian Uprisings.

In 1928, he joined the BBWR together with the Labor Union of Cities and Villages, and until 1930 he served in the Sejm.

He was the vice-president of the supervisory board of Zakłady Chemiczne, founded in 1923. He sat on the main council of the General National Exhibition in Poznań. He served as the president of a number of agricultural organizations, including the Polish Association of Agricultural Organizations, the state-owned Crop and Industrial Bodies, the Polish Bacon Association and the Polish Exports of Spirit and Vodka.

== Private life ==
Wiktor was the son of Jan and Zenobia Przedpełski. His brother was the senator Bolesław Przedpełski. With his first wife Olga Ratiani, he had one son Czesław. After her death, he married Lidia Starkmeth, and had two sons – Jan and Tadeusz.

== Honors ==
- Order of Virtuti Militari
- Order Polonia Restituta
- Cross of Independence
