= Mattithiah Ahrweiler =

Mattithiah Ahrweiler (c.1650 – 19 September 1728) was a German rabbi.

He was born at Frankfurt-am-Main. At the time of his birth his father, Herz, was dayan. Mattithiah officiated as rabbi at Bingen (Jacob Popper, "Responsa," ii., No. 8, Frankfort, 1742), and subsequently at Mannheim, where he taught in the college (see Klaus) founded by Lemle Moses. In 1708 he took part in the dedication of the Lemle Institute. Shortly afterward he was called to Heidelberg as rabbi to the congregation of that city, with jurisdiction over all the congregations in the Palatinate, which position he held until his death. He died at Heidelberg, and the local memorial book praises his piety and learning.
