= Vítor (footballer, born 1987) =

Brazilian footballer

Vitor
Personal information
- Full name: Vitor Cruz de Jesus
- Date of birth: February 1, 1987 (age 39)
- Place of birth: Vera Cruz, Bahia, Brazil
- Height: 1.81 m (5 ft 11 1/2 in)
- Position: Defensive midfielder

Team information
- Current team: Grêmio Catanduvense

Senior career*
Years	Team	Apps	(Gls)
2006–2008	Internacional		
2008	Ceará		
2008	Vila Nova		
2009	Madre de Deus	13	(1)
2009	Atibaia		
2009	Bahia de Feira		
2010	União Barbarense	18	(0)
2010–2012	Atlético Paranaense	20	(0)
2012	CRB	11	(0)
2013–	Grêmio Catanduvense		
- * Club domestic league appearances and goals as of March 12, 2013

Vítor Cruz de Jesus (Vera Cruz, Bahia, February 1, 1987), is a Brazilian footballer who acts as a midfielder. He currently plays for Grêmio Catanduvense.

== Career ==
played for Atlético Paranaense.

=== Career statistics ===
(Correct as of October 16, 2010)

Club	Season	State League		Brazilian Série A		Copa do Brasil		Copa Libertadores		Copa Sudamericana		Total	
Club	Season	Apps	Goals	Apps	Goals	Apps	Goals	Apps	Goals	Apps	Goals	Apps	Goals
Madre de Deus	2009	13	1	-	-	-	-	-	-	-	-	13	1
União Barbarense	2010	18	0	-	-	-	-	-	-	-	-	18	0
Atlético Paranaense	2010	-	-	20	0	-	-	-	-	-	-	20	0
Total		31	1	20	0	-	-	-	-	-	-	51	1

== Contract ==
- Atlético Paranaense: 14 July 2010 to 31 December 2013
