= João Victor =

João Victor may refer to:

== Association football ==
- João Victor (footballer, born 1988), João Victor de Albuquerque Bruno, Brazilian managera and former defensive midfielder
- João Victor (footballer, born 1994), João Victor Santos Sá, Brazilian winger for Krasnodar
- João Victor (footballer, born 1997), João Victor Carroll Santana, Brazilian centre-back for Mirassol
- João Victor (footballer, born 1998), João Victor da Silva Marcelino, Brazilian centre-back for CSKA Moscow
- João Victor (footballer, born 1999), João Victor Lima Ferreira, Brazilian winger for Guarani
- João Victor (footballer, born 2000), João Victor Lucas Wesner, Brazilian defender for Baniyas
- João Victor (footballer, born 2002), João Victor da Silva Oliveira, Brazilian defender for Capivariano
- João Victor (footballer, born 2004), João Victor Vieira Ferreira Sousa, Brazilian forward for Zalaegerszeg
- João Victor (footballer, born January 2007), João Victor de Souza Cunha, Brazilian centre-back for Flamengo
- João Victor (footballer, born July 2007), João Victor Alves de Morais Francisco, Brazilian winger for Internacional

== See also ==
- João Victor (disambiguation)
