= Víctor García (water polo) =

Mexican water polo player (born 1953)

Personal information
- Nationality: Mexican
- Born: 19 June 1953 (age 71)

Sport
- Sport: Water polo

Víctor García (born 19 June 1953) is a Mexican water polo player. He competed in the men's tournament at the 1972 Summer Olympics.
