= Vítor Oliveira =

Vítor Oliveira may refer to:

- Vítor Oliveira (footballer, born 1953) (1953–2020), Portuguese football manager and midfielder
- Vítor Oliveira (footballer, born 2000), Portuguese football forward for Marseille
