= Vítor Pinto =

Portuguese footballer

Personal information
- Full name: Vítor Hugo Magalhães Pinto
- Date of birth: 12 April 1986 (age 40)
- Position: Defender

Team information
- Current team: Berço

Youth career
- 1996–2005: Vitória Guimarães
- 2001–2002: → Amigos Urgeses (loan)
- 2003–2004: → Aves (loan)

Senior career*
Years	Team	Apps	(Gls)
2005–2006	Mirandela		
2006–2007	Maria da Fonte	5	(0)
2007–2008	Vila Meã	24	(0)
2008–2009	Serzedelo	10	(0)
2009–2012	Moreirense	20	(0)
2012–2013	Freamunde	22	(1)
2013–2019	Felgueiras 1932	169	(19)
2019–2020	Merelinense	25	(1)
2020–	Berço	6	(0)
- * Club domestic league appearances and goals ‡ National team caps and goals as of 2 October 2021

Vítor Hugo Magalhães Pinto (born 12 April 1986) is a Portuguese football defender who plays for Berço. He played on the Portuguese second tier for Moreirense and Freamunde.
