= Benjamin Victor =

Benjamin Victor may refer to:

- Benjamin Victor (theatre manager) (died 1778), English theatrical manager and writer
- Benjamin Victor (sculptor) (born 1979), American sculptor and Artist-in-Residence at Northern State University, South Dakota

== See also ==
- Victor (disambiguation)
