= Solomon Abigdor =

Provençal Jewish physician and translator (f. 14th century)

Solomon ben Abraham Abigdor (also rendered as Solomon ben Abraham Avigdor), born in Provence in 1384, was a Hebrew translator, physician, and mystic.

Assisted by his father, Abraham Bonet ben Meshullam, he, at the early age of fifteen years, translated Arnauld de Villeneuve's work, "De Judiciis Astronomiæ," from Latin into Hebrew under the title "Panim ba-Mishpaṭ" (Methods of Judgment). This translation still exists in manuscript. In 1399 he also translated Sacrobosco's "Sphæra Mundi" (On the Astronomy of the Spheres), under the title "Mareh ha-Ofanim" (The Indicator of the Spheres). The last-mentioned work was printed in Abraham bar Ḥiyya's "Ẓurat ha-Areẓ" (Offenbach, 1720), with notes by Mattathiah Delacrut, Manoah Hendel, and others.
