= Vítor Alves =

Vítor Alves may refer to:

- Vítor Alves (soldier) (1935–2011), Portuguese soldier
- Vítor Alves (footballer, born 1985), Portuguese footballer who plays as a rightback
