= Paulo Vitor =

Paulo Vitor may refer to:

- Paulo Vítor (footballer, born 1957), born Paulo Vítor Barbosa de Carvalho, Brazilian football goalkeeper
- Paulo Vitor Damo da Rosa (born 1987), Brazilian Magic: The Gathering player
- Paulo Vítor (footballer, born 1988), born Paulo Vítor Fagundes dos Anjos, Brazilian football goalkeeper
- Paulo Vitor (footballer, born 1999), born Paulo Vitor Fernandes Pereira, Brazilian football winger
- Paulo Vitor (footballer, born 2001), born Paulo Vitor Leal Sousa Lima, Brazilian football defender
- Paulo Vitor (footballer, born 2004), born Paulo Vitor Monteiro, Brazilian football defender/midfielder

== See also ==
- Paulo Victor (disambiguation)
- Paul Victor (footballer) (born 1984), Dominica football defender
