= João Vitor (footballer, born 2000) =

Brazilian footballer

Personal information
- Full name: João Vitor Moreira dos Santos
- Date of birth: 28 May 2000 (age 26)
- Place of birth: Montes Claros, Brazil
- Height: 1.74 m (5 ft 9 in)
- Position: Forward

Team information
- Current team: Araguaína

Youth career
- 2016–2017: América Mineiro
- 2019: América-TO
- 2019–2021: Coritiba

Senior career*
Years	Team	Apps	(Gls)
2018	Montes Claros	7	(0)
2021–2023	Coritiba	10	(1)
2022	→ Linense (loan)	9	(0)
2022	→ Joinville (loan)	0	(0)
2023	Athletic-MG	6	(0)
2023	Contagem	8	(0)
2024	Ipatinga	0	(0)
2024	Santa Helena	7	(0)
2025	Batalhão	7	(2)
2025–	Araguaína	0	(0)
- * Club domestic league appearances and goals as of 20:26, 6 January 2026 (UTC)

João Vitor Moreira dos Santos (born 28 May 2000), known as João Vitor or Robinho, is a Brazilian footballer who plays as a forward for Araguaína.

== Club career ==
Born in Montes Claros, Minas Gerais, João Vitor played for the youth sides of América Mineiro before being released. In 2018, he made his senior debut while playing for hometown side Montes Claros in the Campeonato Mineiro Segunda Divisão.

In 2019, after a brief period in the under-20 side of América de Teófilo Otoni, João Vitor joined Coritiba's youth setup. On 3 August 2020, he renewed his contract with the latter club until December 2022.

João Vitor made his first team debut for Coxa on 25 July 2021, coming on as a second-half substitute for Rafinha in a 1–0 Série B away loss against Operário Ferroviário. On 20 October, in only his second match as a professional, he scored his side's third in a 3–0 home win over Sampaio Corrêa.

On 14 January 2022, João Vitor was loaned to Linense for the year's Campeonato Paulista Série A2. Upon returning, he made his Série A debut with Coritiba on 20 July, replacing Alef Manga late into a 3–1 away defeat to Corinthians.

On 17 May 2023, João Vitor moved to Athletic-MG in the Série D.

== Career statistics ==
As of 22 May 2023

Club	Season	League			State League		Cup		Continental		Other		Total	
Club	Season	Division	Apps	Goals	Apps	Goals	Apps	Goals	Apps	Goals	Apps	Goals	Apps	Goals
Montes Claros	2018	Mineiro 2ª Divisão	—		7	0	—		—		—		7	0
Coritiba	2021	Série B	9	1	0	0	0	0	—		—		9	1
Coritiba	2022	Série A	1	0	—		—		—		—		1	0
Coritiba	2023	Série A	0	0	0	0	0	0	—		—		0	0
Coritiba	Subtotal		10	1	0	0	0	0	—		—		10	1
Linense (loan)	2022	Paulista A2	—		9	0	—		—		—		9	0
Athletic-MG	2023	Série D	0	0	—		—		—		—		0	0
Career total			10	1	16	0	0	0	0	0	0	0	26	1
