= Victor Fonfreide =

French painter (1872–1934)

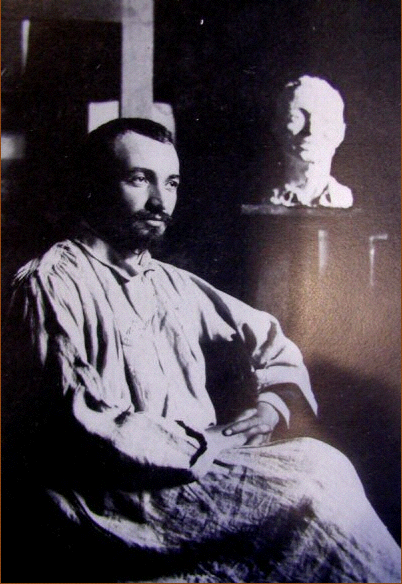
- Fonfreide in 1898
- Born: 24 December 1872; Volvic, Puy-de-Dôme, Auvergne, France
- Died: 12 September 1934 (aged 61); Volvic, Puy-de-Dôme, Auvergne, France
- Occupation: Painter

Victor Fonfreide (1872-1934) was a French painter.
