= Vitor Vilela =

Brazilian SNES ROM hacker

- Occupations: programmer ROM hacker
- Known for: Enhancing Super Nintendo Entertainment System games via the SA1 chip

Vitor Vilela is a Brazilian programmer and ROM hacker known for his work in Super Nintendo Entertainment System games.

== Career ==
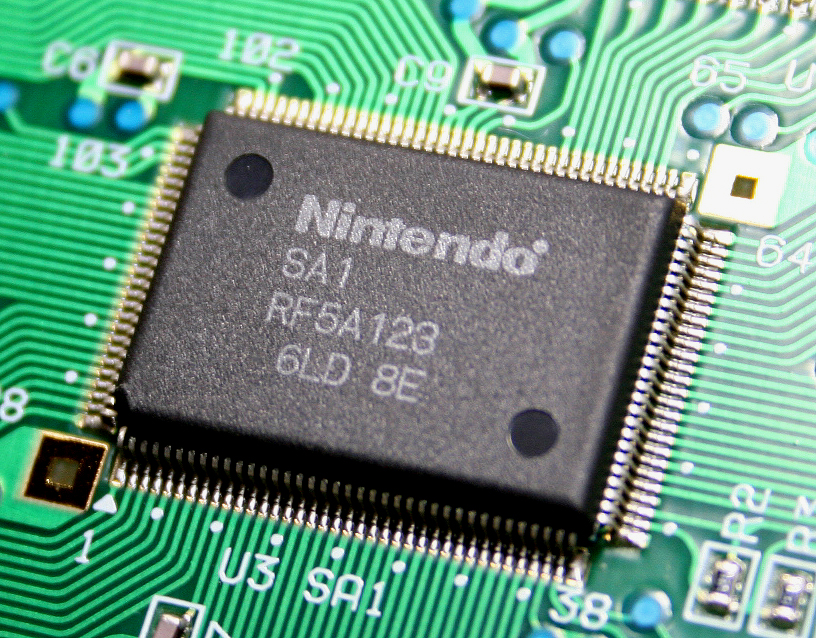
The SA1 chip

Vitor says he got a Super Nintendo Entertainment System (SNES) as a gift from his father at age 7, and the first game he ever played was Super Mario World. Over time, he became interested in how games worked. He initially began editing levels of the aforementioned game using Lunar Magic, and by age 13 or 14, he already had significant knowledge of SNES programming. Later, he decided to study computer engineering professionally.

In 2019, Vitor became known for using the SA1 chip, which improves the speed of SNES games, in Gradius III, making it faster. In January 2021, several websites noticed his work on other games, such as Super Mario World, Super R-Type, Contra III and Super Castlevania IV. In February, Vitor managed to increase the speed of the game Race Drivin' from four to thirty frames per second. In March, he posted a video showcasing Super Mario World in widescreen, and, later in the same month, increased the speed of Axelay. In May, he had access to a rare demo cartridge that contained the SA1 chip. The following month, Vitor showed an image of Super Mario World in ultra widescreen, saying that the widescreen version would be released soon, on his Twitter. This version was released on the 21st.
