= Paulo Victor =

Paulo Victor may refer to:

- Paulo Victor (footballer, born 1987), born Paulo Victor Mileo Vidotti, Brazilian football goalkeeper
- Paulo Victor (footballer, born 1994), born Paulo Victor Costa Soares, Brazilian football forward
- Paulo Victor (footballer, born 1996), born Paulo Victor Rodrigues de Souza, Brazilian football midfielder
- Paulo Victor (footballer, born 1998), born Paulo Victor Dias de Andrade, Brazilian football midfielder
- Paulo Victor (footballer, born 2001), born Paulo Victor de Almeida Barbosa, Brazilian football left-back

== See also ==
- Paulo Vitor (disambiguation)
- Paul Victor (footballer) (born 1984), Dominica football defender
