= James Conway Victor =

British Army general and engineer

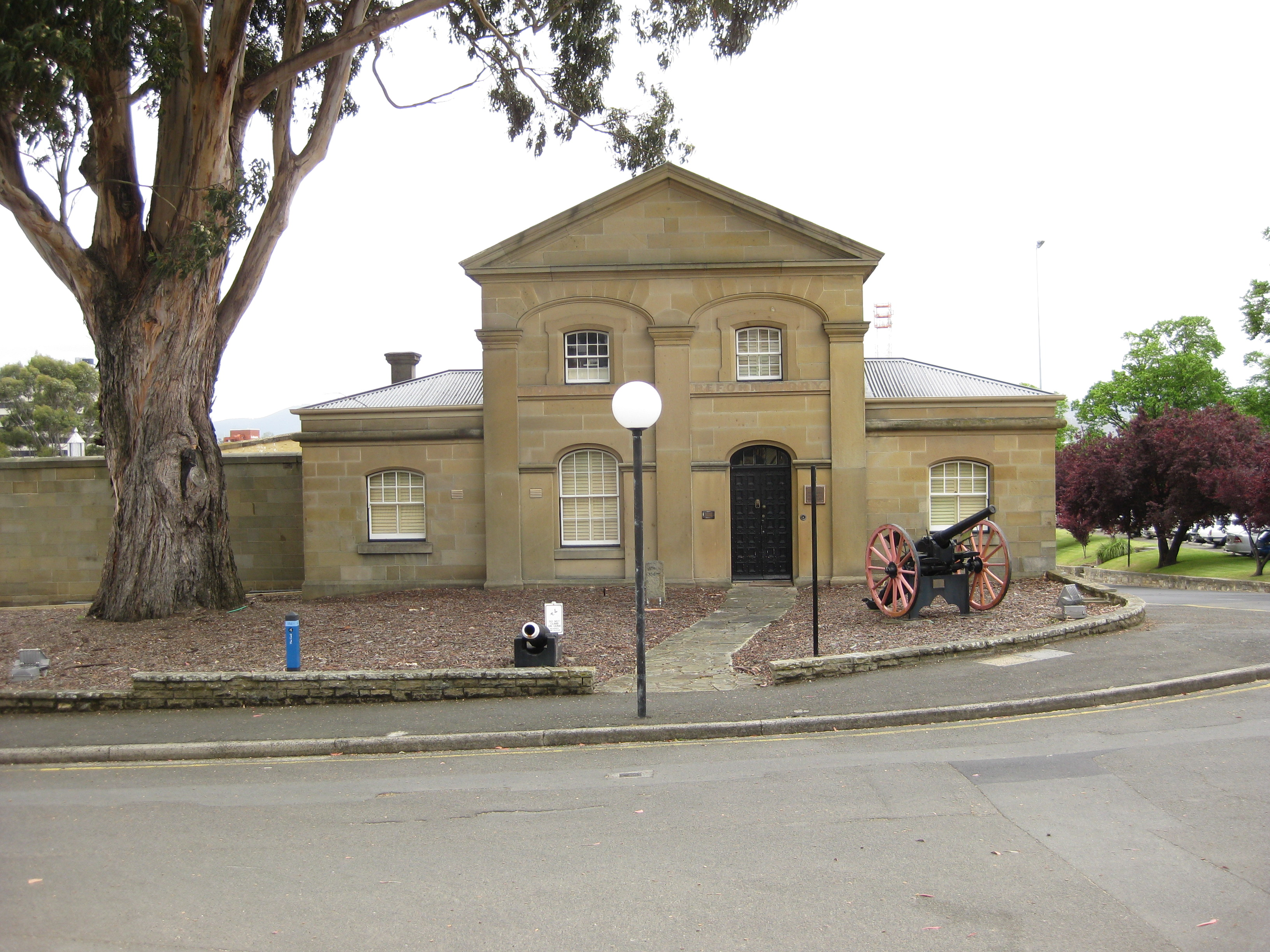
Hobart Barracks Gaol - now a military museum

Major-General James Conway Victor (1792–1864) was a British Army officer who served mainly in Tasmania as a military engineer and architect. He served as director of public works (roads and bridges) in Tasmania from 1843, and was responsible for much of the road infrastructure.

== Life ==
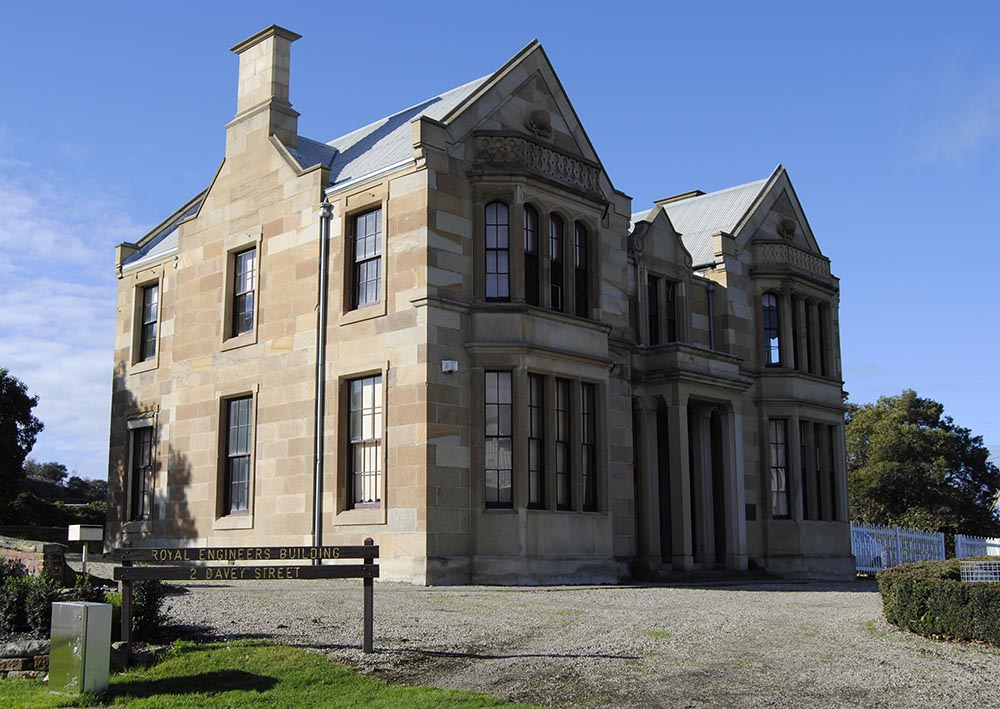
Royal Engineers Building, Hobart

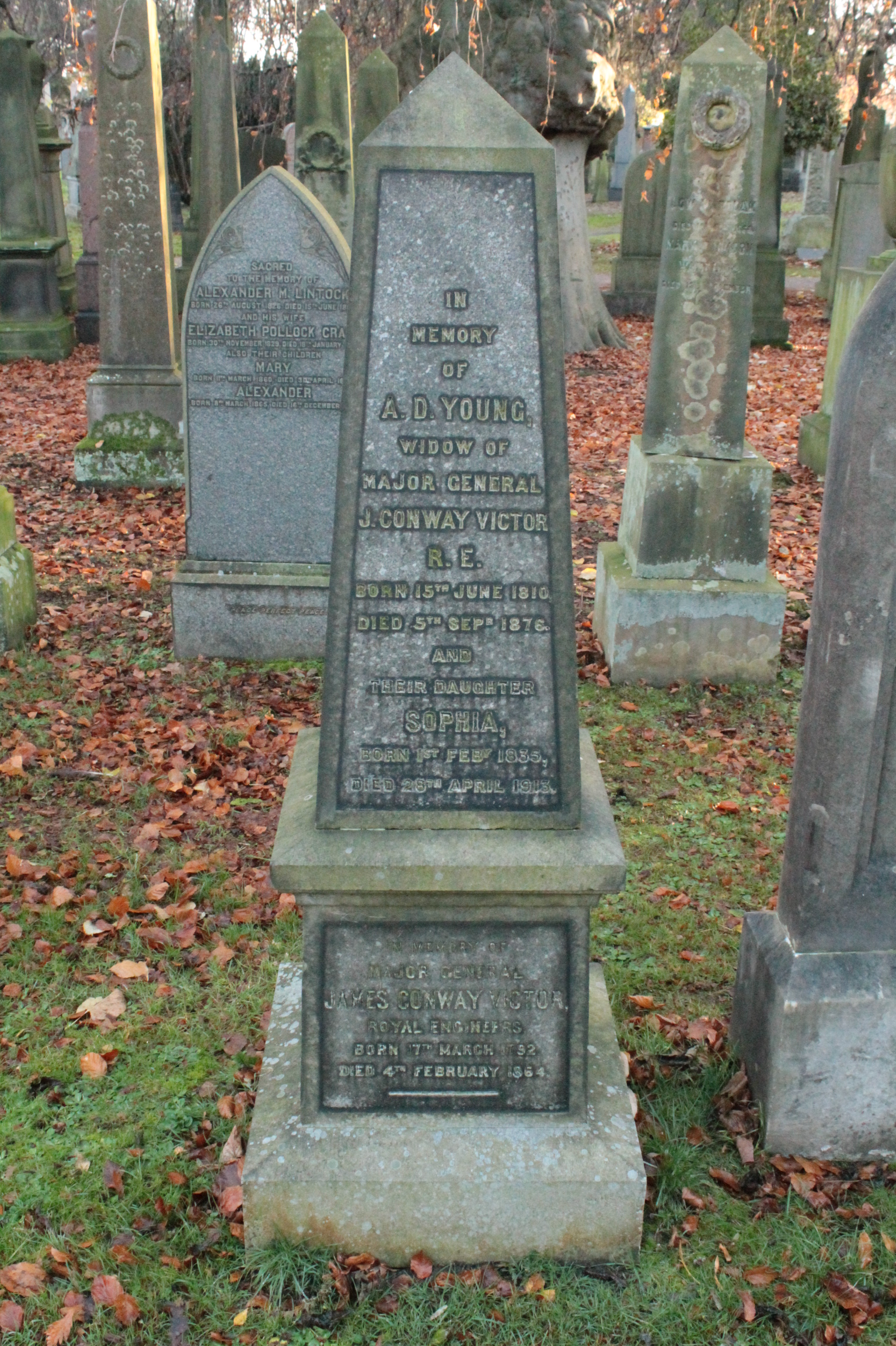
The grave of Major General James Conway Victor, Dean Cemetery

Victor was born in London on 17 March 1792.

He entered the newly created Royal Military College, Sandhurst, as a cadet in 1807 and was created a second lieutenant in 1810 and was promoted to first lieutenant in 1811. He served in the Peninsular War from 1812 to 1814. He saw action at the Battle of Nive, Battle of Orthes and Battle of Toulouse (1814).

In 1821 he was promoted to captain. This appears to have been in the more sedate Royal Engineers, who were not actively engaged in battles during this period. In 1831 he was stationed in Bytown in Canada working on the Rideau Canal under Col John By. He rose to the rank of brigade major by 1837.

In the autumn of 1842 he sailed on the Emily with his wife and young daughter to Hobart in Tasmania, arriving in November 1842 as commander of the Royal Engineers in Tasmania. He was also appointed as director of public works. He settled in Hobart, but his works took him to all parts of the island.

He was assisted by Major Sydney Cotton on projects such as the water supply to Hobart and Launceston. Lieutenant Governor Sir John Eardley-Wilmot appointed Victor as Director of the amalgamated bodies executing public works in 1843 but this system did not work well and it was split back into two bodies by 1844.

In 1846/47 he resisted the orders of Lieutenant Governor Sir William Denison, whom he probably knew from his earlier service in the Royal Engineers. He was commanded to draw up plans for a new wharf (Franklin's Wharf) in Hobart, but instead in July 1847 wrote to his commander in England explaining why this project was financially flawed. However, instead of finding sympathy, this brought about the extreme displeasure of his superiors. They thereafter slowly wound down his involvement in Tasmania, and offered him an early retiral. He probably did not see the completion of the Royal Engineers Building in Hobart which he designed in 1846.

He lived on Hampden Road in Hobart until December 1848, when he retired to Britain to live in Edinburgh, to be close to his wife's relatives. He sailed back on the Calcutta with his wife and 13-year-old daughter.

Despite this obvious shun by his superiors, he was appeased by a promotion to major general in 1854, which secured him a very healthy pension.

He died at home, 12 Eton Terrace in west Edinburgh, on 4 February 1864. He is buried in Dean Cemetery. The grave faces north onto the inner north path within the original cemetery.

== Family ==
In April 1834 he married Anne Dashwood Young (d.1876), youngest daughter of Alexander Young of Harburn House in Midlothian (near West Calder).

They had one daughter, Sophia Victor (1835–1914).

== Buildings and structures ==
- Most bridges in Tasmania dating from 1843 to 1848
- Royal Engineers Building, Hobart
- Gaol at Anglesea Barracks in Hobart (now the Army Museum of Tasmania) (1847)
- Hobart Gaol
- Convict Hospital, Campbell Street Gaol, Hobart
- Government Cottage (forerunner to Government House, Hobart)
- Outbuildings and landscaping at Government House
