= John Victor =

John Victor may refer to:

- John Victor (runner) (1892-1935), South African middle-distance runner
- John Victor (Brazilian footballer) (born 1996), Brazilian football goalkeeper
- John Victor (Indian footballer) (died 2015), Indian football defender
