= Zé Vitor =

Zé Vitor may refer to:

- Zé Vítor (footballer, born 1982), born José Vítor Jardim Vieira, Portuguese football midfielder
- Zé Vitor (footballer, born 1991), born José Vitor Rodrigues Ribeiro da Silva, Brazilian football defensive midfielder
- Zé Vitor (footballer, born 1998), born José Vitor dos Santos Silva, Brazilian forward
- Zé Vitor (footballer, born 2000), born José Vitor Silva Neves, Brazilian football midfielder
- Zé Vitor (footballer, born 2001), born José Vitor Lima Cardoso, Brazilian football defender
- Zé Vitor (footballer, born 2002), born José Vitor Geminiano Cavalieri, Brazilian football defender
- Zé Vitor (politician) (born 1984), Brazilian politician

== See also ==
- Zé Victor (born 1990), born José Victor de Souza dos Santos, Brazilian football midfielder
