= Jonathan David Victor =

Jonathan David Victor (born 1954) is an American neuroscientist and neurologist, the Fred Plum Professor of Neurology at Weill Cornell Medical College. He has published over 100 peer-reviewed articles in research areas such as neurophysiology, psychophysics, computational neuroscience, and clinical neuroscience. He also published an article on Hermite polynomials.

In addition to his professorship at Weill-Cornell, he is also Director of the Division of Systems Neurology and Neuroscience at New York Hospital-Cornell Medical Center.

He trained with Robert Shapley as a graduate student at Rockefeller University and as a neurology resident with Fred Plum at the Weill Cornell Medical College.

== Awards ==
- McKnight Scholars Award, 1984-1986
- Klingenstein Fellowship in Neuroscience, 1990
