= Víctor Martínez =

Víctor Martínez may refer to:

- Victor Martinez (author) (1954–2011), Mexican American poet and author
- Víctor Martínez (baseball) (born 1978), Venezuelan-born Major League Baseball player
- Víctor Martínez (bodybuilder) (born 1973), Dominican professional bodybuilder
- Víctor Martínez (runner) (born 1975), Andorran middle-distance runner
- Víctor Hipólito Martínez (1924–2017), former Vice President of Argentina
