= Vítor Campos =

Portuguese footballer (1944–2019)

Personal information
- Full name: Vítor José Domingos Campos
- Date of birth: 11 March 1944
- Place of birth: Torres Vedras, Portugal
- Date of death: 8 March 2019 (aged 74)
- Place of death: Coimbra, Portugal
- Position: Midfielder

Senior career*
Years	Team	Apps	(Gls)
1963–1976	Académica	275	(27)

International career
1967	Portugal	1	(0)
- * Club domestic league appearances and goals

Vítor José Domingos Campos (Torres Vedras, Lisbon District, 11 March 1944 - Coimbra, 8 March 2019) was a Portuguese footballer who played as a midfielder.

== See also ==
- List of one-club men
