= Mattithiah ben Solomon Delacrut =

Mattithiah ben Solomon Delacrut was a Polish-Jewish scholar who lived in the middle of the 16th century.

== Life and career ==
He settled early in Italy, and at one time seems to have attended the lectures on Cabala and philosophy at the University of Bologna, devoting himself to the interpretation of cabalistic and scientific works.

== Bibliography ==
- "Perush," a commentary on Joseph Gikatilla's cabalistic work, "Sha'are Orah," Cracow, 1600;
- a commentary on Solomon Abigdor's Hebrew translation of Sacrobosco's treatise on astronomy, Tractatus de Sphæra, or "Aspectus Circulorum," (Hebrew, "Mar'eh ha-Ofannim"), with an explanation of the difficult passages of the translation according to the reading of his masters of the University of Bologna, and the interpretation he had found in Christian works (Cracow, 1720)
- "Ẓel ha-'Olam" (The Image of the World), a translation of a treatise on cosmography written in French by Gossouin, under the title "Livre de Clergie," or "L'Image du Monde" (Amsterdam, 1733).
