= Avigdor Aptowitzer =

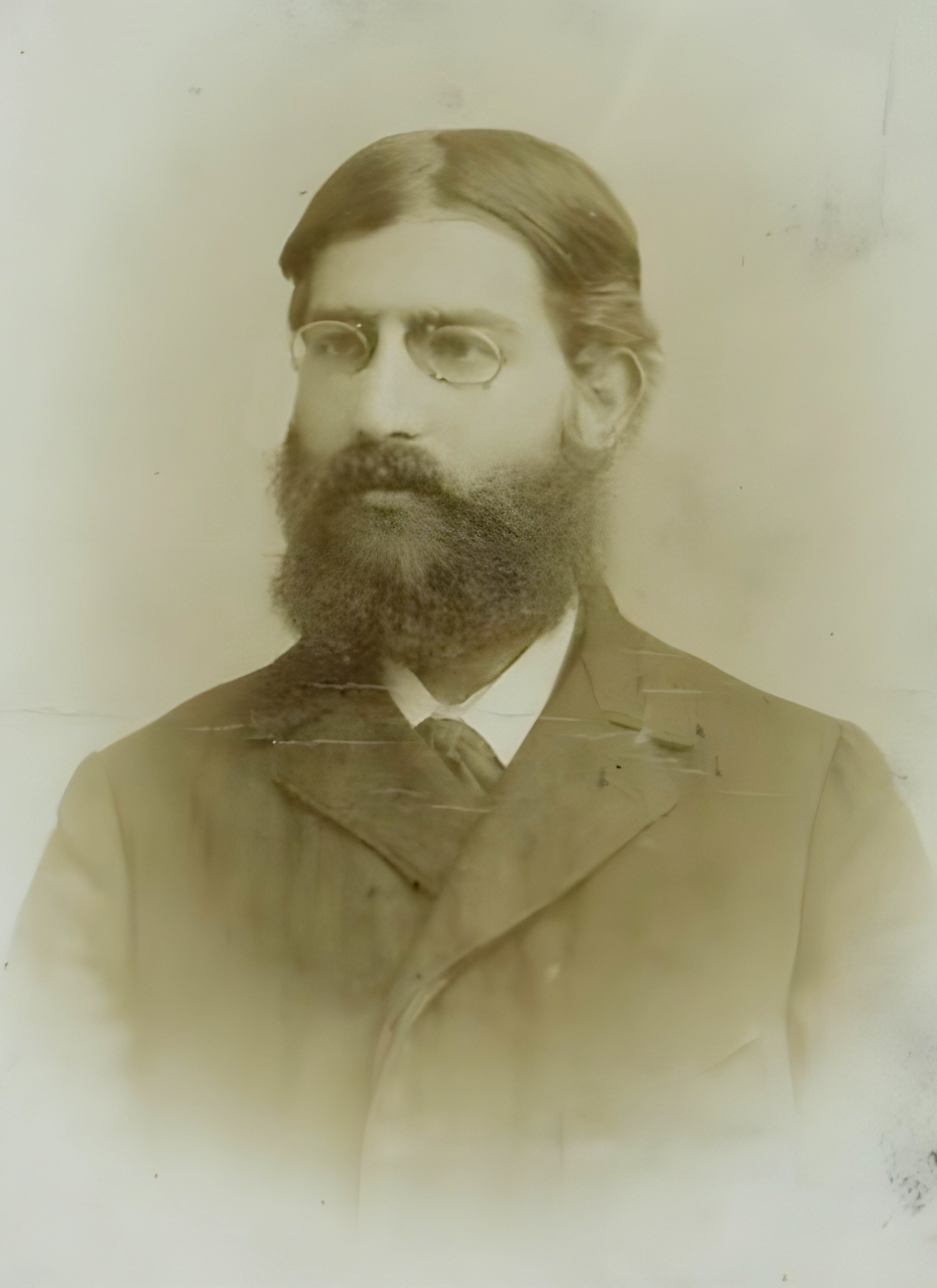
Aptowitzer

Avigdor (Victor) Aptowitzer (Hebrew: אביגדור אפטוביצר; 16 March 1871 – 5 December 1942) was a rabbi and talmudic scholar.

== Life ==
Aptowitzer was born in Ternopil (Galicia) on 16 March 1871. His father was Moshe Aaron Kasner, who was the head of a small yeshiva and his mother was Tziril Aptowitzer. The family was aligned with the Chortikov hassidic dynasty and sometimes went to three court of the Grand Hasidic Rebbe of Husiaten.

While in Husiaten be began learning science and gradually ceased to pay visits to the rebbe of Husiaten and in retribution the rebbe's followers asked the Austro-Hungarian empire to draft him into the army, which it did. In 1896 Aptowitzer traveled to Chernowitz where he studied for his matriculation exam, which he passed. He earned a living by teaching mathematics. In 1899 he received rabbinical ordination and became engaged to Malka Durnboim.

After his engagement Aptowitzer traveled to Vienna to study at the University and at the Hebrew Teachers College. In 1909, he became a lecturer at the Hebrew Teachers College. Solomon Schechter invited him to the United States in 1918 but Aptowitzer turned down the proposal. The scholar Hirsch Perez Chajes appointed him as a teacher in the Israelitisch-Theologische Lehranstalt (Jewish Theological Seminary) he founded. Aptowitzer served as a professor of Talmud, Tanakh (Jewish bible), Midrash and Jewish philosophy.

In 1924 Aptowitzer was invited to an academic position in Jerusalem but he turned down the offer because of his wife's illness. In 1938, after his wife died, Aptowitzer emigrated to Palestine, but at that time there was no position available for him. In Israel he edited his papers for publication. Aptowitzer died on 5 December 1942 and was buried in Jerusalem's Mount of Olives cemetery. In his last will and testament he asked that his tombstone only state that he edited the works of Ra'avyah; he also asked that his unpublished writings be burned. Throughout his life he suffered from a number of diseases and shortness of vision and in his later years he was blind.

Aptowitzer belonged to the Mizrachi religious Zionist movement.

== Works ==
His edition of the work of Ra'avyah (Eliezer ben Yoel HaLevi) includes a comprehensive scholarly introduction and copious notes. The first volumes were published by the Meḳiẓe Nirdamim society in Berlin in 1912 and in Jerusalem in 1935. He published a volume of corrections in 1936 and the introduction in 1938. Under the sponsorship of the Yad Harav Herzog Institute and the Harry Fischel Institute for Talmudic Research, the work was reprinted (3 volumes, not including the Introduction) and supplemented by a fourth volume (dealing with laws of persons) edited by Rabbis Eliyahu Friesman and She'ar Yashuv Cohen. Aptowitzer also published a comprehensive work in German on the readings of scripture in rabbinic literature entitled Das Schriftwort in Der Rabbinischen Literatur as well as:

- Abhandlungen Zur Erinnerung an Hirsch Perez Chajes
- Mehkarim be-sifrut ha-Geonim (Research in the Literature of the Gaonim), Jerusalem, 1941
- BEITRÄGE ZUR MOSAISCHEN REZEPTION IM ARMENISCHEN RECHT. In Kommission bei A. Hölder, Wien 1907
- The rewarding and punishing of animals and inanimate objects: On the Aggadic view of the world (1923)
- Observations on the criminal law of the Jews (1924)
- Kain und Abel in der Agada (Cain and Abel in the Aggada) (1922)
- Parteipolitik der Hasmonäerzeit im rabbinischen und pseudoepigraphischen Schrifttum. Wien, 1927
- The Celestial Temple as Viewed in the Aggadah

In addition Aptowitzer published more than 350 articles in several of languages.

== Students ==
- Hanoch Albeck
- Salo Baron
