= Abraham Abigdor =

Jewish physician and writer (born 1350)

- Born: 1350 probably Arles
- Known for: translating Latin documents to Hebrew
- Scientific career
- Fields: translation, philosophy

Abraham Abigdor (also rendered as Abraham Avigdor), born 1350, was a Jewish physician, philosopher, kabbalist, and translator. He should not be confused with Maestro Abraham Abigdor, who in 1386 was the proprietor of a house at Arles ("Monatsschrift," 1880, pp. 410, 411).

Abraham Abigdor was born in Provence, France, probably at Arles. He devoted his early life to the study of medicine and philosophy. At the age of 17 (1367) he wrote "Sefer Segullat Melakim" (Royal Treasure), a work on logic in rimed prose, in the main a Hebrew imitation of the "Tendencies of the Philosophers," by Gazzali, but of independent value in the more purely logical portions of the book. Afterward he went to Montpellier to study medicine and to be instructed, as he himself writes, by Christian scholars and mystics.

== Work ==
Abigdor translated the following Latin works into Hebrew:

- Under the title, "Mebo bi-Melakah" (Introduction to the Practise of Medicine), the treatise on materia medica of the chancellor or dean of the faculty, Bernard Alberti, which treatise is based on book iv. of the "Canon of Avicenna". According to Moritz Steinschneider ("Hebr. Uebers." p. 777), the original Latin has been printed under the title "Gentilis de Fulgineo".
- The "Medicationis Parabolæ" of Arnau de Vilanova (1378).
- Under the title, "Sefer Mebo ha Ne'arim" (Introduction for the Young), the elementary treatise on fevers, by Gerard de Solo (1379).
- "Megillah," the treatise of Arnau de Vilanova on "Digestive and Purgative Medicines" (1381).
- "Almanzuri," the abridged commentary of Gerard de Solo on the ninth book of Razi's "Ad Almansorem." The translation is greatly abbreviated, but remarks of his own, derived from personal experience, are added.
- "Tratato" or "Higgayon," from the "Tractatus Summularum," a treatise on logic, by Pierre d'Espagne.
- Explanations of the middle commentary of Averroes (Ibn Roshd) on the first three parts of the "Organon": the "Isagoge", the "Categories", and "De Interpretatione". This is derived not only from Arabic but also from Latin sources.

In 1399 Abigdor assisted his son Solomon Abigdor, then only 15 years of age, in the translation of the Latin treatise, "De Judiciis Astronomiæ," or "Capitula Astrologiæ," of Arnau de Vilanova into Hebrew, under the title "Panim ba-Mishpaṭ".
