= Victoria =

Victoria most commonly refers to:

- Queen Victoria (1819–1901), Queen of the United Kingdom and Empress of India
- Victoria (state), a state of Australia
- Victoria, British Columbia, Canada, a provincial capital
- Victoria, Seychelles, the capital city of the Seychelles
- Victoria (mythology), Roman goddess of victory

Victoria may also refer to:

== Animals and plants ==
- Victoria (moth), a genus in the family Geometridae
- Victoria (plant), a waterlily genus in the family Nymphaeaceae
- Victoria plum, a plum cultivar
- Victoria (goose), the first goose to receive a prosthetic 3D printed beak
- Victoria (grape), another name for the German/Italian wine grape Trollinger

== Arts and entertainment ==
=== Films ===
- Victoria, a Russian 1917 silent film directed by Olga Preobrazhenskaya, based on the Knut Hamsun novel
- Victoria (1935 film), a German film
- Victoria (1972 film), a Mexican film based on Henry James' 1880 novel Washington Square
- Victoria (1979 film), a Swedish film based on the Knut Hamsun novel
- Victoria (2008 film), a French-Canadian film
- Victoria (2013 film), a Norwegian film
- Victoria (2015 film), a German film
- Victoria: Ek Rahasya, a 2023 Indian film

=== Games ===
- Victoria: An Empire Under the Sun, computer game by Paradox Interactive
- Victoria II, the sequel from Paradox Interactive
- Victoria 3, the third game from the Victoria series from Paradox Interactive

=== Music ===
- "Victoria" (Dance Exponents song), 1982
- "Victoria" (Eve 6 song), 2012
- "Victoria" (The Kinks song), 1969 (covered by The Fall in 1988)
- "Victoria" (Magnus Uggla song), 1993
- "Victoria", a 2008 song by Jukebox the Ghost song from Let Live and Let Ghosts

=== Novels ===
- Victoria (novel), 1898, by Knut Hamsun
- Victoria, 1993, by Sami Michael
- Victoria: a novel of 4th generation war, 2014, by William S. Lind

=== Television shows and episodes ===
- Victoria (Mexican TV series), a 1987 Mexican telenovela
- Victoria (2007 TV series), an American telenovela
- Victoria (British TV series), a 2016 British television series

== Beverages ==
- Victoria (Cervecería Centro Americana), a pale Guatemalan lager
- Victoria (Grupo Modelo), a dark Mexican lager
- Victoria (soda), a fruit-flavored soda available in Querétaro (México) and owned by The Coca-Cola Company
- Victoria Bitter, a bitter Australian lager

== Media ==
=== Television channels ===
- Televictoria, the former name of Costa Rican television channel Repretel 11
- Victoria Televisión, the former name of Teledos (Peruvian TV channel), a defunct Peruvian television channel

== People and fictional characters ==
- Victoria (given name), including a list of people and fictional characters
- Empress Victoria (disambiguation), various empresses
- Queen Victoria (disambiguation), various queens
- Princess Victoria (disambiguation), various princesses
- Saint Victoria (disambiguation), various saints
- Victoria (surname), a list of people
- Lisa Marie Varon (born 1971), wrestler known by the ring name "Victoria"
- Victoria, professional name of Song Qian (born 1987), Chinese singer-songwriter and actress
- Victoria Georgieva (born 1997), Bulgarian singer known by the mononym Victoria
- Victória (footballer), Brazilian footballer Victória Kristine Albuquerque de Miranda (born 1998)

== Places ==
=== Africa ===
- Limbe, Cameroon, known as "Victoria" until 1982
- Victoria (neighborhood), Alexandria, Egypt
- Victoria, Seychelles, capital of the country of Seychelles
- Victoria, Gauteng, South Africa
- Victoria Bay, a small cove in the Western Cape, South Africa
- Lake Victoria, with its shoreline in Kenya, Uganda, and Tanzania
- Victoria Falls, on the border between Zambia and Zimbabwe
- Masvingo Province, previously Victoria Province, in Zimbabwe

=== Argentina ===
- Victoria, Buenos Aires
- Victoria Department, in Entre Ríos Province
- Victoria, Entre Ríos

=== Australia ===
- County of Victoria, South Australia
- Electoral district of Victoria, South Australia
- Province of Victoria, Anglican ecclesiastical province in Australia
- Victoria (state), a state of the Commonwealth of Australia
- Victoria Daly Regional Council, a local government area in the Northern Territory
- Victoria Valley, Tasmania, a locality
- Victoria Settlement or New Victoria, alternate names for Port Essington in the Northern Territory

=== Canada ===
==== Canadian cities, roads and wards ====
- Victoria, British Columbia, provincial capital
- Victoria, Manitoba
- Victoria, Newfoundland and Labrador
  - Victoria River (Newfoundland and Labrador)
- Victoria, Nova Scotia
- Victoria Ward (Ottawa), Ontario
- Victoria, Prince Edward Island
- Victoria Island, Nunavut/Northwest Territories
- Victoria Trail, Edmonton, Alberta

==== Canadian electoral districts ====
- Canadian Senate divisions, named Victoria (in Quebec, Ontario, British Columbia, Nova Scotia, New Brunswick) and Victoria-Carleton (in New Brunswick)
- Victoria (Alberta federal electoral district) (1909–1925)
- Victoria (Alberta provincial electoral district) (1905–1940)
- Victoria (British Columbia federal electoral district), a federal electoral district in British Columbia
- Victoria (British Columbia provincial electoral district) (1871–1890 and 1966–1986)
- Victoria (New Brunswick federal electoral district) (1867–1914)
- Victoria (New Brunswick provincial electoral district) (1846–1973)
- Victoria (Nova Scotia federal electoral district) (1867–1904)
- Victoria (Ontario electoral district) (1903–1966), a federal electoral district in Ontario
- Victoria (territorial electoral district) (1894–1905), a territorial electoral district until Alberta became a province in 1905
- Victoria City (federal electoral district) (1904–1924), a federal electoral district in British Columbia
- Victoria City (provincial electoral district), (1861–1963), a provincial electoral district in British Columbia
- Victoria District, (1871–1872), a federal electoral district in British Columbia
- Victoria-The Lakes, a provincial electoral district in Nova Scotia named Victoria from 1867 until 2003

=== Hong Kong ===
- Victoria, Hong Kong, the de facto capital of Hong Kong during the British colonial period
- Victoria Peak, a mountain on Hong Kong Island

=== Mexico ===
- Ciudad Victoria, the capital of the Mexican state of Tamaulipas
- Victoria, Guanajuato
- Victoria Municipality, Guanajuato
- Victoria Municipality, Tamaulipas

=== New Zealand ===
- Victoria, Gisborne
- Victoria, Rotorua

=== Philippines ===
- Victoria, Laguna
- Victoria, Northern Samar
- Victoria, Oriental Mindoro, a 2nd class municipality
- Victoria, Roxas, Oriental Mindoro, a barangay
- Victoria, Tarlac
- Ciudad de Victoria, a tourism and entertainment complex in Bulacan
- NCCC Mall VP, a shopping mall in Davao City previously known as Victoria Plaza

=== Romania ===
- Victoria, Botoșani County, a village in Hlipiceni Commune
- Victoria, Botoșani County, a village in Stăuceni Commune
- Victoria, Brașov, a town in Brașov County
- Victoria, Brăila, a commune in Brăila County
- Victoria, Iași, a commune in Iași County
- Victoria, Tulcea County, a village in Nufăru Commune

=== United Kingdom ===
- Victoria (Hackney ward), a civic ward in the London Borough of Hackney, England
- Victoria (Sefton ward), a civic ward in the Metropolitan Borough of Sefton, Merseyside, England
- Victoria, Cornwall, a hamlet
- Victoria, Newport, Wales
- Victoria, London, a district named after Victoria railway station
- Victoria, Roman name of Comrie, Scotland
- Victoria, a ward of Newbury, Berkshire

=== United States ===
- Victoria, Alabama
- Victoria, Arkansas
- Victoria, Georgia
- Victoria, Illinois
- Victoria, Indiana
- Victoria, Kansas
- Victoria, Louisiana
- Victoria, Michigan
- Victoria, Minnesota
- Victoria, Bolivar County, Mississippi, a ghost town
- Victoria, Marshall County, Mississippi
- Victoria, Missouri
- Victoria (Charlotte, North Carolina), a historic home in Mecklenburg County
- Victoria, Texas
- Victoria, Virginia
- Victoria, West Virginia
- Victoria, Aguadilla, Puerto Rico, a barrio

=== Other places in the Americas ===
- Victória, former spelling of Vitória, Espírito Santo, Brazil
- Victoria, Chile, a city in Malleco Province, southern Chile
- Victoria, Caldas, a town and municipality in the Department of Caldas, Colombia
- Victoria, Cabañas, a municipality in the department of Cabañas, El Salvador
- Victoria, Grenada, a town in Saint Mark Parish
- Victoria, Guyana
- Victoria, Yoro, Honduras

=== Elsewhere ===
- 12 Victoria, a main-belt IIIa asteroid
- Victoria (crater), in the Meridiani Planum, Mars, named after one of Ferdinand Magellan's ships
- Victoria Land, Antarctica
- The Latin name of the siege camp during the battle of Parma, Italy, intended by Frederick II to be the seat of his kingdom
- Victoria, Labuan, the capital of the Federal Territory of Labuan, Malaysia
- Victoria, Gozo, capital of Gozo, Malta
- Victoria, Sărăteni, Leova district, Moldova

== Schools ==
- Victoria University (disambiguation)
- Victoria School (disambiguation)
- Victoria Institution, Kuala Lumpur
- Victoria Junior College, Singapore

== Science and technology ==
- Victoria (3D figure), the articulated 3D figure by DAZ 3D
- Victoria (birthing simulator), a medical-education simulator by Gaumard Scientific
- List of storms named Victoria, various cyclones

== Sports ==
=== Football (soccer) ===
- C.D. Victoria, Honduran football team
- Northwich Victoria F.C., Cheshire, England
- Victoria CF, Spanish football team
- FC Victoria Chișinău, Moldovan football team
- Victoria Jaworzno, a Polish boxing and football team
- Victoria Rosport, a Luxembourg football team
- Victoria SC, a Bangladesh football team

=== Other sports ===
- Victoria cricket team, Australian cricket team
- Victoria Jaworzno, a Polish boxing and football team
- Victoria Libertas Pesaro, an Italian basketball team
- Victoria National Golf Club, Indiana, U.S.
- Victoria Vikes, the athletic program of the University of Victoria in Canada

== Transport ==
=== Maritime ===
- Galera Victoria, Spanish galleon which sank in 1729
- HMCS Victoria (SSK 876), a Canadian submarine
- HMS Victoria, four ships of the British Royal Navy
- HMVS Victoria, two ships of the Victorian Naval Force
- Lake Victoria ferries of Kenya, Tanzania and Uganda
- RMS Victoria, a Lake Victoria ferry now called MV Victoria
- Spanish ship Victoria, several ships of the Spanish Navy
- SS Victoria, various ships
- Victoria 17, an American sailboat design
- Victoria 18, an American sailboat design
- Victoria, a ferry that sank 24 May 1881 in London, Ontario (see List of Canadian disasters by death toll)
- Victoria (ship) (also known as Nao Victoria and Vittoria), the first ship to circumnavigate the world
- Victoria (sternwheeler), an 1869 paddle steamer operating in British Columbia in what is now Canada
- Victoria Class (disambiguation), various ship classes named Victoria

=== Rail ===
- GWR Victoria Class, type of steam locomotive
- Victoria (Plynlimon & Hafan Tramway locomotive), a locomotive on the former Plynlimon & Hafan Tramway
- London Victoria station, the second busiest rail terminus in London
- Manchester Victoria station, the third busiest rail station in Manchester, and its corresponding tram stop
- Victoria station (disambiguation), several railway and bus stations
- Victoria line, a south-west to north-east line that runs through central London on the London Underground network

=== Other forms of transport ===
- Victoria (carriage), open carriage named after Queen Victoria
- Victoria (Mexico City Metrobús), a BRT station in Mexico City
- Victoria (motorcycle), a now defunct German bicycle and motorcycle manufacturer
- Vickers Victoria, troop transport aircraft of the British Royal Air Force

== See also ==
- La Victoria (disambiguation)
- Lake Victoria (disambiguation)
- List of places named after Queen Victoria
- Mount Victoria (disambiguation)
- Port of Victoria (disambiguation)
- The Victoria (disambiguation)
- Victor (disambiguation)
- Victoria and Albert (disambiguation)
- Victoria Avenue (disambiguation)
- Victoria Building (disambiguation)
- Victoria Bridge (disambiguation)
- Victoria College (disambiguation)
- Victoria County (disambiguation)
- Victoria Dam (disambiguation)
- Victoria Dock (disambiguation)
- Victoria Hill (disambiguation)
- Victoria Hospital (disambiguation)
- Victoria Island (disambiguation)
- Victoria Memorial (disambiguation)
- Victoria Park (disambiguation)
- Victoria Peak (disambiguation)
- Victoria River (disambiguation)
- Victoria Road (disambiguation)
- Victoria Square (disambiguation)
- Victoria Street (disambiguation)
- Victoria Theatre (disambiguation)
- Victoria Tower (disambiguation)
- Victoria Township (disambiguation)
- Victoria United (disambiguation)
- Victoria Ward (disambiguation)
- Victorian (disambiguation)
- Victorias (disambiguation)
- Victorio (disambiguation)
- Viktoria (disambiguation)
- Vitoria (disambiguation)
