= VFC =

VFC may stand for:

== Businesses ==
- VFC (company), a British food manufacturer
- VF Corporation, an American fashion brand

== Electronics ==
- VESA Feature Connector, on computer graphics cards
- Voltage-to-frequency converter, a voltage-controlled oscillator

== Sports clubs ==
- Valour FC, Winnipeg, Canada
- Vancouver FC, Township of Langley, Canada
- Vitória F.C., Setúbal, Portugal
- Vitória Futebol Clube (ES), Espírito Santo, Brazil

== Other uses ==
- Vaccines for Children Program, a US federal program
- Victory for Change, a political party in Liberia
- Virtual Fighting Championship, a 2018 video game

== See also ==
- VCF (disambiguation)
- Valencia Football Club (disambiguation)
- Vasco Fernandes Coutinho (disambiguation)
- Victorian Football Club (disambiguation)
- Vitória Futebol Clube (disambiguation)
- Vlad Filat Cabinet (disambiguation)
