= Royal Victoria =

Royal Victoria is a reference to Queen Victoria and may refer to:

== Places ==
- Royal Victoria Place, Tunbridge Wells

=== Parks ===
See Royal Victoria Park (disambiguation)

- Royal Victoria Park, Bath
- Royal Victoria Country Park, Netley, previously the site of the Royal Victoria Military Hospital

== Hospitals ==
See Royal Victoria Hospital (disambiguation)

=== General hospitals ===
- Royal Victoria Hospital, Folkestone, England (established 1846)
- Royal Victoria Hospital, Belfast, Northern Ireland (established 1873), the first (1906) air-conditioned building in the world
- Royal Victoria Hospital, Bournemouth, England (established 1889)
- Royal Victoria Hospital, Dundee, Scotland (established 1899)
- Royal Victoria Regional Health Centre, formerly the Royal Victoria Hospital, Barrie, Ontario, Canada (established 1891)
- Royal Victoria Hospital, Montreal, Quebec, Canada (established 1893)
- Royal Victoria Hospital, Edinburgh, Scotland (established 1894)
- Royal Victoria Infirmary, Newcastle upon Tyne, England (established 1751 as the Newcastle Infirmary, expanded and renamed in 1906)

=== Specialist hospitals ===
- Royal Victoria Military Hospital, or Netley Hospital, Hampshire, England (established 1856)
- Royal Victoria Eye and Ear Hospital, Bournemouth, England (established 1887)
- Royal Victoria Eye and Ear Hospital, Dublin, Ireland (established 1897)

== Others ==
- Royal Victorian Order
- Royal Victoria Dock, in London
  - Royal Victoria DLR station
- Royal Victoria Regiment, Australian Army
- Royal Victoria (ship), lost 1864
- GoodLife Fitness Victoria Marathon, previously the Royal Victoria Marathon, Vancouver Island
