= Victorian =

Victorian or Victorians may refer to:

== 19th century ==
- Victorian era, British history during Queen Victoria's 19th-century reign
  - Victorian architecture
  - Victorian house
  - Victorian decorative arts
  - Victorian fashion
  - Victorian literature
  - Victorian morality
  - Victoriana
  - The Victorians, a 2009 British documentary about the Victorian era

== Demonyms ==
- Victorian, a resident of the state of Victoria, Australia
- Victorian, a resident of the provincial capital city of Victoria, British Columbia, Canada

== Other ==
- RMS Victorian, a ship
- Saint Victorian (disambiguation), various saints
- Victorian (horse)
- Victorian Football Club (disambiguation), either of two defunct Australian rules football clubs

== See also ==
- Neo-Victorian, a late 20th century aesthetic movement
- Queen Victoria
- Victoria (disambiguation)
- The Victorians (disambiguation)
