= Victoria Island (disambiguation) =

Most places named Victoria Island are named for Queen Victoria by British explorers or by others. It may refer to:

== Argentina ==
- Victoria Island (Argentina), in the Nahuel Huapi National Park

== Canada ==
- Victoria Island in the Arctic, the eighth-largest island in the world and shared between the Northwest Territories and Nunavut
- Victoria Island (Ottawa River), an island near Ottawa in Ontario

== Chile ==
- Victoria Island (Chile), an island in the Chonos Archipelago of Southern Chile

== Malaysia ==
- Labuan (also known as Victoria Island), an island off Borneo in Malaysia

== Nigeria ==
- Victoria Island, Lagos, a former island off Lagos State in Nigeria

== Russia ==
- Victoria Island (Russia), an island in the Arctic ocean west of Franz Josef Land, named for the British steam yacht Victoria

== United States ==
- Victoria Island (California), United States, an island in the Sacramento–San Joaquin River Delta near Stockton, California
  - Victoria Island structure, an impact crater beneath Victoria Island, California

== Other ==
- Victoria Island, a fictional island in the MMORPG MapleStory
- Hong Kong Island (unofficially sometimes "Victoria Island"), home to the territory's capital Victoria City, Victoria Peak and nearby Victoria Harbour

== See also ==
- Victoria (disambiguation), other topics called "Victoria"
