= Eucalyptus Island =

Island in California

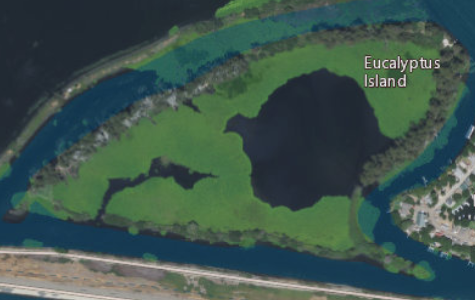
- USGS aerial imagery of Eucalyptus Island, with Widdows Island to its northwest and Kings Island to its southeast.

- Location within Sacramento-San Joaquin River Delta Location within California Location within the United States

Geography
- Location: Northern California
- Coordinates: 37°51′35″N 121°34′15″W
- Adjacent to: Sacramento–San Joaquin River Delta
- Highest elevation: 3 ft (0.9 m)

Administration
- United States
- State: California
- County: Contra Costa

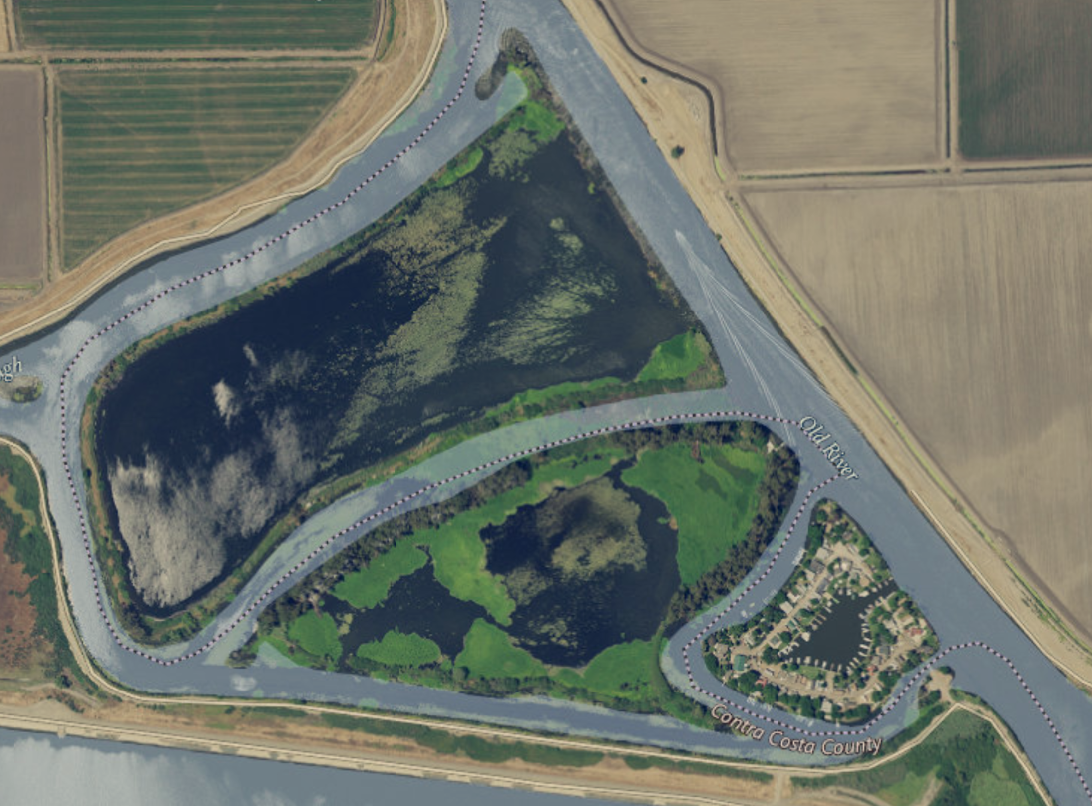
From left to right, Widdows Island, Eucalyptus Island and Kings Island. Byron Tract is on the west edge, and Victoria Island is on the east edge.

Eucalyptus Island is a small island in the Sacramento–San Joaquin River Delta. It is part of Contra Costa County, California. Its coordinates are 37°51′35″N 121°34′15″W, and the United States Geological Survey measured its elevation as 3 ft (0.91 m) in 1981. It appears on a 1978 USGS map of the area.
