= VU =

VU, Vu or vu may refer to:

== Arts and entertainment ==
=== Music ===
- Sandra Vu, American musician, singer, and songwriter
- The Velvet Underground, American rock band
  - VU (album), an album released by the Velvet Underground
- Volume unit as displayed on a VU meter

=== Other media ===
- Vu (film), an Indian film
- Vu (magazine), a French publication that existed from 1928 to 1940
- Tom Vu, poker player and former infomercial star

== Businesses and organizations ==
=== Political organizations ===
- Patriotic Union (Vaterländische Union), a political party in Liechtenstein
- Venstres Ungdom, the youth wing of the Danish liberal party Venstre
- Volksunie, a defunct Flemish political party

=== Universities ===
- Victoria University (disambiguation), various unrelated universities

==== United States ====
- Valparaiso University in Valparaiso, Indiana
- Vanderbilt University in Nashville, Tennessee
- Vanguard University in Costa Mesa, California
- Villanova University in Villanova, Pennsylvania
- Vincennes University in Vincennes, Indiana

==== Elsewhere ====
- Vedanta University in Orissa, India
- Vilnius University in Vilnius, Lithuania
- Virtual University of Pakistan in Lahore, Punjab, Pakistan
- Vrije Universiteit Amsterdam in Amsterdam, Netherlands
- Vrije Universiteit Brussel in Brussels, Belgium

=== Other businesses and organizations ===
- Air Ivoire, IATA airline designator
- Vietravel Airlines, IATA airline designator
- Vivendi Universal, now Vivendi SA, a French company active in media and communications
- Agence Vu, a photography agency, publisher and gallery based in Paris
- Vu Televisions, a television brand and an LED TV and display manufacturer based in Mumbai

== Science and technology ==
- ν_{μ}, in physics, the symbol for a muon neutrino
- .vu, Vanuatu's country code top-level domain
- Vu+, satellite set-top box equipment
- LG Vu, a cell phone produced by LG
- Vulnerable species, on the IUCN Red List
- VU meter, a representation of audio signal strength

== Other uses ==
- Vanuatu (country code VU)
- Voices United, the official hymn book of the United Church of Canada
- Vũ, Vietnamese surname

== See also ==
- Voo (disambiguation)
- Vue (disambiguation)
- Vou, French commune
