= St. Nicholas Hotel =

St. Nicholas Hotel may refer to:

- St. Nicholas Hotel (Albany, Georgia), listed on the NRHP in Georgia
- St. Nicholas Hotel (Springfield, Illinois), listed on the NRHP in Illinois
- St. Nicholas Hotel (St. Louis, Missouri)
- St. Nicholas Hotel (Omaha, Nebraska)
- St. Nicholas Hotel (New York City)
