= Victoria General Hospital =

Victoria General Hospital may refer to:

- Victoria General Hospital (Victoria, British Columbia)
- Victoria General Hospital (Halifax, Nova Scotia)
- Victoria General Hospital (Winnipeg)

== See also ==
- Victoria Hospital
