= The Victoria =

The Victoria may refer to several public houses in England:

- The Victoria, Bristol, Grade II* listed
- The Victoria, Bayswater, London
- The Victoria, Durham, Grade II listed
- The Victoria, Great Harwood, Lancashire
- The Victoria, Richmond, Grade II listed, in Richmond upon Thames

== See also ==
- Victoria (disambiguation)
- La Victoria (disambiguation)
- The Victor (disambiguation)
