= Kings Island (California) =

Island in the northern California, United States

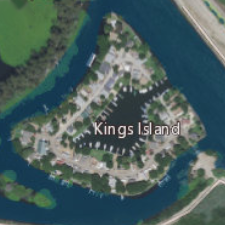
- USGS aerial imagery of the island, with Eucalyptus Island to the northwest, Victoria Island to the northeast, and the bridge to the Clifton Court levee to the south.

- Location within Sacramento-San Joaquin River Delta Location within California Location within the United States

Geography
- Location: Northern California
- Coordinates: 37.857982°N 121.568839°W
- Adjacent to: Sacramento-San Joaquin River Delta
- Area: 8.6 acres (3.5 ha)

Administration
- United States
- State: California
- County: San Joaquin

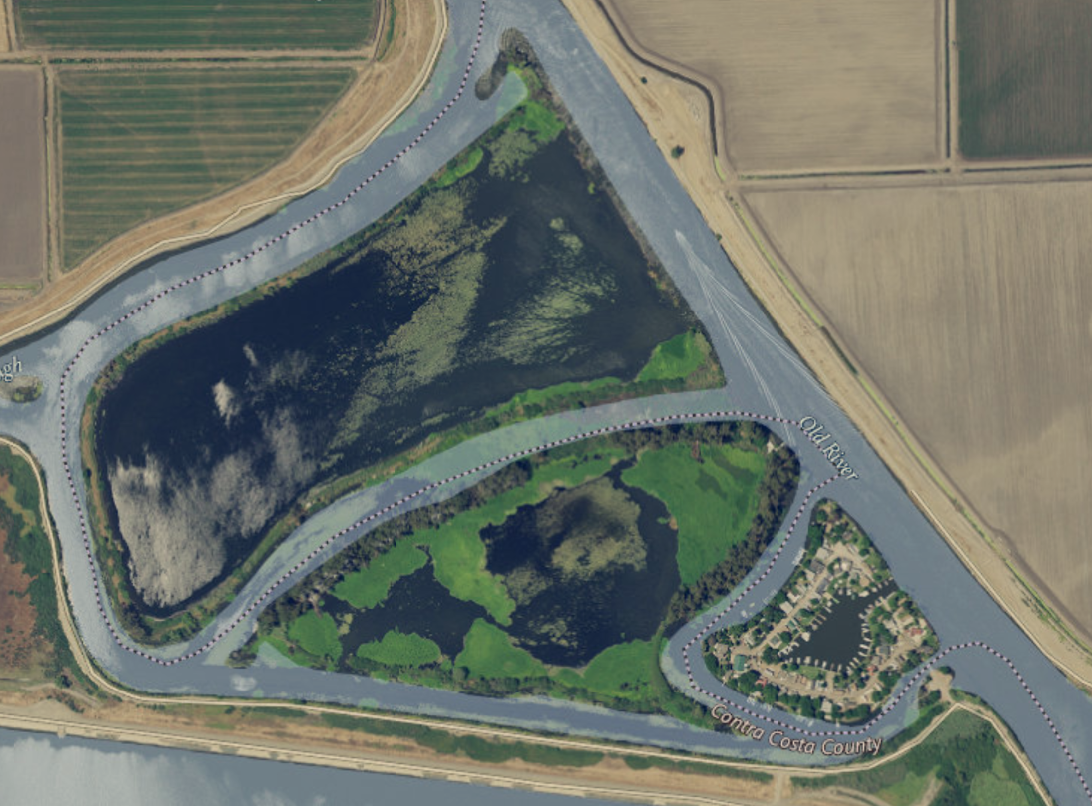
From left to right, Widdows Island, Eucalyptus Island and Kings Island. Byron Tract is on the west edge, and Victoria Island is on the east edge.

Kings Island (formerly Bra's Island) is an island in the Old River in the south Sacramento-San Joaquin River Delta in San Joaquin County, California, 9.3 miles (15 km) southwest of Stockton. The small 8.6-acre (3.5 ha) island is the smallest of a cluster of delta islands including Eucalyptus Island, Widdows Island, Victoria Island, and Coney Island, adjacent to Clifton Court Forebay. At 3 feet (0.91 m) above sea level with the surrounding waters kept a bay by a levee system, the island is accessible only by the one road from the Clifton Court levee or by boat. It appears on a 1978 United States Geological Survey map of the area.

== See also ==
- List of islands of California
