= The Victorians (disambiguation) =

The Victorians may refer to:

== Books ==
- The Victorians, 1941 book by Mary Stocks
- The Victorians: An Anthology, 1950 book edited by Geoffrey Grigson
- The Victorians, 1960 book by Sir Charles Petrie, 3rd Baronet
- The Victorians, 1966 book by Joan Evans (art historian)
- The Victorians, 1978 book by Laurence Lerner
- The Victorians: An Anthology of Poetry and Poetics, 2000 book edited by Valentine Cunningham
- The Victorians, 2002 book by A. N. Wilson
- The Victorians (Rees-Mogg book), 2019 book by Jacob Rees-Mogg

== TV series ==
- The Victorians, 2009 British documentary series

== See also ==
- Victorian (disambiguation)
- Victorian People
- Victorian era
