= RVH =

RVH may refer to:

- Right ventricular hypertrophy
- Royal Victoria Regional Health Centre
- Royal Victoria Hospital (disambiguation)
- RvH, the 2012 debut solo album by Dutch drummer Roel van Helden.
