= Widdows Island =

Island in California

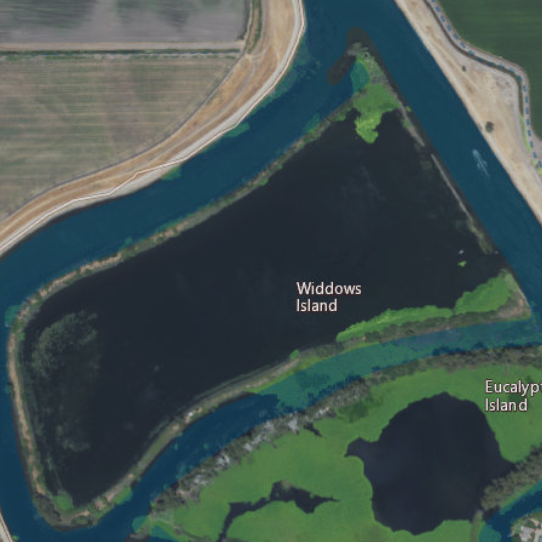
- USGS aerial imagery of Widdows Island, with Byron Tract to its northwest, Victoria Island to its northeast and Eucalyptus Island to its southeast.

- Location within Sacramento-San Joaquin River Delta Location within California Location within the United States

Geography
- Location: Northern California
- Coordinates: 37°51′40″N 121°34′27″W
- Adjacent to: Sacramento–San Joaquin River Delta
- Highest elevation: 0 ft (0 m)

Administration
- United States
- State: California
- County: San Joaquin

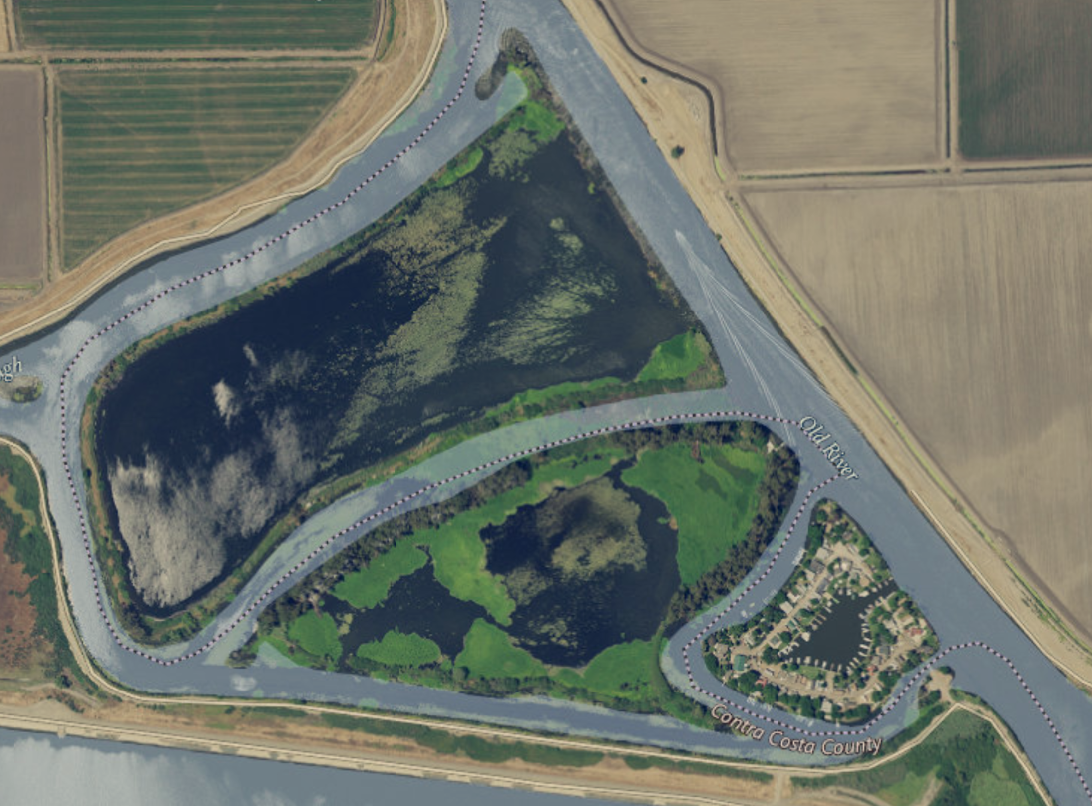
From left to right, Widdows Island, Eucalyptus Island and Kings Island. Byron Tract is on the west edge, and Victoria Island is on the east edge.

Widdows Island is a small island in the Sacramento–San Joaquin River Delta along the Old River distributary of the San Joaquin River. It is part of San Joaquin County, California. Its coordinates are 37°51′40″N 121°34′27″W, and the United States Geological Survey measured its elevation as 0 ft (0 m) in 1981. It appears on USGS maps of the area as dry land up to 2018; the latest 2021 topographic map shows the island now mostly flooded, with the old levee surrounding it still above water.
