= Victoria Road =

Victoria Road may refer to:

== Roads ==
- Victoria Road, Sydney, Australia
- Victoria Road, Cambridge, England
- Victoria Road, Oxford, England
- Victoria Road, Kensington, London, England
- Victoria Road, Hong Kong, a road from Kennedy Town to Pok Fu Lam
- Kawartha Lakes Road 35, historically the Victoria Colonization Road, in Ontario
- Victoria Road, Wood Green, London, England

== Other ==
- Victoria Road, Ontario, Canada, a village on the road listed above
- Victoria Road, Dagenham, a football stadium in Dagenham, England
- Victoria Road, Port Talbot, a football stadium in Wales

== See also ==
- Victoria Road Prison, Douglas, Isle of Man
- Victoria Trail, Edmonton, Canada
