= VCF =

VCF may refer to:

== Organizations ==
- Valencia CF, a Spanish professional football club in Valencia
- Victory (church) (formerly VCF), an evangelical Protestant church based in the Philippines

== Technology ==
- Variant Call Format, the format of a text file used in bioinformatics for storing gene sequence variations
- vCard, a file format standard for electronic business cards
- Virtual Case File, a software application developed by the United States Federal Bureau of Investigation
- VMware Cloud Foundation, an infrastructure platform for hybrid cloud management of the VMware Infrastructure product line
- Voltage-controlled filter, an electronic filter whose operating characteristics can be set by an input control voltage
- Volume correction factor, a standardized computed factor used to correct for the thermal expansion of fluids

== Other ==
- September 11th Victim Compensation Fund, an act of the US Congress to compensate the victims of the September 11 attacks
- VCF, one of several brands of spermicide
- Vintage Computer Festival, an international event celebrating the history of computing

== See also ==
- VFC (disambiguation)
