= Victoria School (disambiguation) =

Victoria School may refer to:

In Canada:

- Victoria School of the Arts, Edmonton, Alberta
- Victoria High School (British Columbia), Victoria, British Columbia
- Southern Victoria High School, Perth-Andover, New Brunswick
- Victoria School (Saskatoon), Saskatchewan, three schools

In Fiji:

- Queen Victoria School (Fiji)

In Malaysia:

- Victoria Institution, Malaysia

In Scotland:

- Queen Victoria School, Stirling

In Singapore:

- Victoria School, Singapore
- Victoria Junior College, Singapore

In the United States:

- Victoria High School (Kansas), Victoria, Kansas
- Victoria Career Development School, Victoria, Texas
- Victoria High School (Texas), Victoria, Texas
- Victoria High School (Victoria, Virginia)

In the United Kingdom:

- Ulverston Victoria High School, Cumbria

In Vietnam:

- Victoria School Systems

In Zimbabwe:

- Victoria High School (Zimbabwe), Masvingo
