= Uvic (disambiguation) =

UVic, or the University of Victoria is a university in Greater Victoria British Columbia, Canada.

UVic may also refer to:

- Uvic acid, more commonly known as tartaric acid
- 150145 Uvic, an asteroid named after the University of Victoria
- University of Vic - Central University of Catalonia, a university in Osona, Spain

== See also ==
- Victoria University (disambiguation), for other educational institutions with Victoria and University in their name
