= Victoria Park =

Victoria Park may refer to:

== Places ==
=== Australia ===
- Victoria Park Nature Reserve, a protected area in Northern Rivers region, New South Wales
- Victoria Park, Adelaide, a park and racecourse
- Victoria Park, Brisbane, a public park and former golf course
- Victoria Park, Melbourne, a football ground
- Victoria Park railway station, Melbourne
- Victoria Park, Western Australia, a suburb of Perth
  - Electoral district of Victoria Park
  - Town of Victoria Park local government area
  - Victoria Park railway station, Perth
- Victoria Park Racecourse, Sydney
- Victoria Park, Sydney, a park

=== Canada ===
- Victoria Park, Calgary, Alberta
- Victoria Park (Edmonton), Alberta
- Victoria Park, New Brunswick, a park in Moncton, New Brunswick
- Victoria Park, St. John's, Newfoundland and Labrador
- Victoria Park, Halifax, Nova Scotia
- Victoria Park, Truro, Nova Scotia
- Victoria Park, Kitchener, Ontario
- Victoria Park, London, Ontario
- Victoria Park Avenue, Toronto, Ontario
  - Victoria Park station (Toronto)
  - Victoria Park Collegiate Institute
  - Victoria Park amusement park which operated from 1878 until 1906
- Victoria Park, Charlottetown, Prince Edward Island
- Parc Victoria, Quebec
- Victoria Park, Regina, Saskatchewan
- Victoria Park, (Woodstock), Ontario

=== New Zealand ===
- Victoria Park, Auckland, a park
- Victoria Park, Christchurch, a park
- Victoria Park, Whanganui, a cricket ground

=== South Africa ===
- Victoria Park, Port Elizabeth, Eastern Cape
- Victoria Park, Queenstown, Eastern Cape
- Victoria Park, Worcester, Western Cape

=== Sri Lanka ===
- Viharamahadevi Park, formerly Victoria Park, Colombo
- Victoria Park, Nuwara Eliya, a park

=== United Kingdom ===
- Victoria Park, Aberdeen, a park
- Royal Victoria Park, Bath, a park
- Victoria Park, Belfast, a park
- Victoria Park, Bideford, a park in Devon
- Victoria Park, Dorset
- Victoria Park Football Ground, Bournemouth, a football ground
- Victoria Park, Bristol, a park
- Victoria Park, Buckie, a football ground
- Victoria Park, Burscough, a football stadium
- Victoria Park, Cardiff, a park
- Victoria Park, Dingwall, a football ground
- Victoria Park, Edinburgh, a park and neighbourhood
- Victoria Park, Finchley, a park in London
- Victoria Park, Glasgow, a park
- Victoria Park (Hartlepool), a football ground
- Victoria Park, Leamington Spa, a park
- Victoria Park, Leicester, a park
- Victoria Park, Manchester, a district and a park
- Victoria Park, Newbury, a park
- Victoria Park, Plymouth, a park
- Victoria Park, Portsmouth, a park
- Victoria Park, Southport, a park
- Victoria Park, St Helens
- Victoria Park, Swansea, a park
- Victoria Park, Swinton, a park
- Victoria Park, Tipton, a park
- Victoria Park, Tower Hamlets, a park in London
- Victoria Park, Tunstall, a park in Stoke-on-Trent
- Victoria Park, Warrington
- Victoria Park, Widnes

=== Other countries ===
- Victoria Park, Hamilton, Bermuda, a park
- Victoria Park (Kingstown), a football stadium in Saint Vincent and the Grenadines
- Victoria Park (Hong Kong), a park
- Victoria Park, Wolvega, a horse racing venue in The Netherlands
- Victoria Park, Los Angeles, California, U.S.
- Bahadur Shah Park, formerly Victoria Park, a park in Dhaka, Bangladesh
- Victoria Park, Fort Lauderdale, Florida, U.S.

== Other uses ==
- Victoria Park (album), by Aaron Powell, 2015
- Victoria Park (horse), a Canadian thoroughbred racehorse
- Victoria Park, home football ground of Nelson F.C.
- Victoria Park Football Club, 1934–1935, now Perth Football Club
- Victoria Park, home football grounds for Guernsey F.C.

== See also ==
- Royal Victoria Park (disambiguation)
- Viktoriapark, Kreuzberg, Berlin, Germany
