= Victoria University =

Victoria University may refer to:

- Victoria University (Australia), a public research university in Melbourne, Australia
- Victoria University, Toronto, a federated university of the University of Toronto in Canada
- Victoria University of Wellington, a public research university in Wellington, New Zealand
- Victoria University (United Kingdom), a former federal university in England
  - Victoria University, Leeds, a former constituent college, now the University of Leeds
  - Victoria University, Liverpool, a former constituent college, now the University of Liverpool
  - Victoria University of Manchester, a former constituent college, now merged into the University of Manchester
- Victoria University Uganda, a private university in Kampala, Uganda
  - SC Victoria University, a football team in Uganda associated with Victoria University Uganda
- Victoria University of Bangladesh, a private university in Dhaka, Bangladesh
- Victoria University College (Myanmar), a private university in Myanmar
- University of Victoria, a university in British Columbia, Canada
- Victoria University Secondary College, a co-educational state high school in Victoria, Australia

== See also ==
- Texas A&M University–Victoria, a public university
- Victoria College (disambiguation)
- University of Vic - Central University of Catalonia, a university in Spain
- Uvic (disambiguation)
- VU (disambiguation)
- Victoria (disambiguation)
