= La Victoria =

La Victoria may refer to:

== Places ==
=== Chile ===
- La Victoria, Santiago

=== Colombia ===
- La Victoria, Amazonas, a town and municipality
- La Victoria, Boyacá, a town and municipality
- La Victoria, Valle del Cauca, a town and municipality

=== Dominican Republic ===
- La Victoria, Dominican Republic

=== Mexico ===
- La Victoria, Veracruz in Catemaco Municipality

=== Paraguay ===
- La Victoria District, Paraguay

=== Peru ===
- La Victoria District, Chiclayo
- La Victoria District, Lima

=== Spain ===
- La Victoria, Córdoba, Spain
- La Victoria de Acentejo, Santa Cruz de Tenerife, in the Canary Islands

=== United States ===
- La Victoria, Texas

=== Venezuela ===
- La Victoria, Apure
- La Victoria, Aragua, a municipal seat in Aragua State

== Other uses ==
- Battle of La Victoria (1812), in La Victoria, Aragua, Venezuela
- Battle of La Victoria (1814), in La Victoria, Aragua, Venezuela
- Church of La Victoria, Alcalá de los Gazules, Andalusia, Spain
- La Victoria (company), a Mexican food company
- La Victoria FC, former name of Belizean football club Nizhee Corozal

== See also ==
- Victoria (disambiguation)
- The Victoria (disambiguation)
