= Poser (software) =

3D computer graphics program

- Developer: Bondware
- Release: 1995; 31 years ago
- Stable release: Poser 13.3 / Mar 2024
- Operating system: Windows, OS X
- Type: 3D computer graphics software
- License: Proprietary software
- Website: www.posersoftware.com

Poser (and Poser Pro) is a figure posing and rendering 3D computer graphics program distributed by Bondware. Poser is optimized for the 3D modeling of human figures. It enables beginners to produce basic animations and digital images, along with the extensive availability of third-party digital 3D models.

== Overview ==
Poser is a single-threaded 3D rendering software package for the posing, animating, and rendering of 3D poly-mesh human and animal figures. It is published by Bondware and supported by Renderosity, a graphic 3D art content store. Poser allows the user to load figures, props, lighting, and cameras for both still and animated renderings.

Using a subset of the Alias object (OBJ) file format and a text-based markup for content files, Poser comes with a library of pre-rigged human, animal, robotic, and cartoon figures. The package also includes poses, hairpieces, props, textures, hand gestures, and facial expressions. As Poser itself does not allow for original modeling of objects, a large community market of artists has emerged, in which Poser content is created and sold through various third party channels.

Poser is available in multiple languages including English, Japanese, German, and French. Poser is available for both Microsoft Windows and Mac OS X operating systems. While Poser's interface has evolved since the product's introduction in 1995, the current Poser Pro 13 preserves many of the application's original interface elements in order to not alienate the legacy users from the newer versions.

== Features ==
Renderosity offers a selection of ready-to-use content to add to Poser's included runtime library of base content, including body and hand poses, materials, props, facial expressions, hairpieces, lights, cameras, and a Reyes-based render engine called Firefly, which supports nodes for the creation of complex materials. Furthermore, it provides import of sound, image, and video files, motion capture data and 3D content for the creation of scenes or the addition of new library items. Poser exports content in many 3D formats. Poser is capable of material editing, facial photo matching, dynamic hair, dynamic cloth and new figure rigging. Online content is also available. Python enables third-party developers to create additional features ranging from custom libraries, rendering engine control panels, metadata editors and utility scripts.

== Usage ==
Poser is used to create original images ranging from human figures, human renderings of medical and industrial design illustrations, editorial illustrations, informational graphics, graphic novel illustrations, comics, and more.

Poser contains many animation capabilities and is regularly employed by broadcast professionals including animation staff at Fox Bones, Colbert Report and Jimmy Kimmel Live!, as well as in industry applications, such as in the animated instructions for automated checkout machines at Albertsons, Save-On stores and Wal-Mart, films including the Star Trek fan-film Star Trek: Aurora,The Misty Green Sky, and The Exigency. Poser characters and animations were used for early computer games from 'buddies' game creators ("Desert Rifle" games and "Cake shop" from Qi and ELEFUN(TM) game developers). The software was also used in the eighth, ninth, and tenth seasons of Red vs. Blue, as well as the first three seasons of RWBY.

Standard Poser characters have been extensively used by European and US-based documentary production teams to graphically render the human body or virtual actors in digital scenes. Humanoids printed in several science and technology magazines around the US are often Poser-rendered and post-worked models.

A film animated entirely on Poser, titled The Exigency, took thirteen years to produce and was released on December 14, 2019.

== Library ==
Poser is packaged with ready-to-use 3D content that allows new users to get started without needing to purchase additional content. Items are stored in Poser's drag-and-drop-enabled Library and are organized by type and name, e.g. People/Ryan2. Users can save customized figures or objects into the Library in order to reuse those items at a later point in time. The Library also supports adding in additional "Runtimes" which are collections of content that legacy users have assembled from third party providers.

The Library includes a configurable, keyword-based Search function that locates content in the Library or connected Runtimes. Content can also be added to the Library's Favorites for quick access.

The Library is set up with categories that each include collections of similar content items:

Character
Pre-rigged figures including anatomically accurate humans, mannikins, animals, insects, dinosaurs, cartoon characters, human anatomies such as skeletons, and musculature and mechanical figures such as vehicles.
Pose
Animated and static poses for human and animals covering day-to-day activities, dancing, walking, standing, and sitting, as well as action and sport poses.
Face
Includes full and partial facial expressions.
Hair
Includes prop-based transparency-mapped hairpieces, dynamic hairpieces, and hair props such as mustaches or sideburns.
Hand
Hand poses of various types such as action poses and gestures, signals, counting, and American Sign Language.
Props
Includes primitives such as spheres and cylinders, clothing items grouped by character, scene props, furniture, rooms, vehicles, plants, and cartoon elements.
Lights
Includes animated or static pre-set lights consisting of spotlights, infinite lights, point lights, diffuse IBL lights.
Cameras
Includes animated or static cameras.
Materials
Includes simple and complex node-based materials.
Scenes
Full Poser scenes including a Factory, Crime Scene Lab, and a modern Apartment.

== History ==
Poser was created by artist and programmer Larry Weinberg as a digital replacement for artist's mannequins. Versions 1.0 and 2.0 were published by Fractal Design. In 1997, Fractal Design was acquired by MetaCreations, and Poser's interface was redesigned by MetaCreations' Phil Clevenger for release as Poser 3 in 1998. This interface has remained as the basis for all subsequent versions. In 1999, MetaCreations sold Poser to egi.sys AG, which established the subsidiary Curious Labs, with Larry Weinberg as CEO to handle Poser development and publication. Curious Labs and Poser were sold to e-frontier, in 2003. In November 2007, Smith Micro Software acquired Poser as well as Anime Studio (now called Moho). Smith Micro Software also acquired the English language distribution rights to Manga Studio (now called Clip Studio Paint), from e-Frontier. After Bondware acquired Poser in 2019, its first update was Poser 11.2, announced in September 2019, and it followed with Poser 12, its first major update in over five years, in early 2021. Poser 11 introduced many new features, including better rigging capabilities.

Early versions of Poser were bundled with fully clothed humanoid figures specifically designed for Poser. As the program evolved, add-on packages of human figures were sold by the manufacturer of Poser, and eventually, third-party companies began creating figures which work with Poser. As clothing became separate from the humanoid figure, collections of 3D garments were created for specific models which conform to the shape and pose of the Poser figure. 'Poses' for figures were packaged and sold by the software vendor and by third parties. 'Morphs', allowing customization of body or face shape or other features, were also sold. Different skin textures, frequently combined with settings for morph technology, are marketed to allow one base model to be customized into many different 'characters'. Similarly 'texture' packages allow one garment to take on many different appearances, an animal to represent different breeds of the same species or a vehicle to show many different color schemes.

On July 2, 2009, Smith Micro Software announced the creation of a new platform for distribution of assets for use in Poser called Content Paradise.

On November 9, 2018, Smith Micro Software announced the closure of Content Paradise on December 3, 2018, the content moved to Renderosity.

On June 20, 2019, Smith Micro Software announced they sold the product line of its Poser software to Bondware, Inc., owner of the popular online marketplace, Renderosity.com, and longtime Smith Micro resale partner.

Version	Release date	Publisher	Improvements / Notes
1.0	1995	Fractal Design Corporation	First release
2.0	1996	Fractal Design	Ability to add props; Animation; High resolution models
3.0	1998	MetaCreations	New user interface; Facial posing and animation; Human figures with jointed fingers.
4.0	1999	MetaCreations	Natural-media sketch renderer; Figure sculpting via deformers; Transparent mode for materials; Conforming Clothes; Transparency (which lead up to TransHair that increased the quality of hair sold today)
4.0.3	September 1999	Curious Labs	Markup path names made to use relative paths; Currently sold as entry level Poser Artist
Pro Pack	February 2000	Curious Labs	Add on pack for Poser 4; Implementation of Python scripting, Custom figure rigging; Ability to host Poser scenes in 3ds max, LightWave 3D, and Cinema 4D.; No longer available
5.0	2003	Curious Labs	FireFly Reyes/ray tracing renderer; Dynamic hair and cloth; Collision detection; Morph Putty Tool (Interactively work with morphs)
6.0	March 2005	Curious Labs; e-frontier	OpenGL Hardware acceleration; Image-based lighting, Ambient Occlusion; Cartoon outline rendering effects; Inclusion of "Primitives" Zygote Props; Binary Morphs (allows you to load the morphs for characters in a separate file linked to Cr2 resulting in faster load time in Poser); Inclusion of male and female genitalia
7.0	December 2006	e-frontier	Simon and Sydney (new AdultG2 male and female figures); Wildlife including eagle and wolf; Updates to Ben and Kate the Poser Child figures with new morphs, textures and rigging; New motion capture data, light sets, poses, and materials; Talk Designer for lip-sync animation; Multiple Undo/Redo; Multithreaded rendering; High-dynamic-range imaging; Brush morphing; Animation Layers; Universal Poses for bipedal figures, with automatic conversion of Poser 1-6 poses; Streamlined access to Runtime libraries; Universal Binary
Poser Pro	May 2008	Smith Micro Software	Poser Pro was released adding COLLADA support and plugin support for Cinema C4d and Maya.
Poser 8	August 4, 2009	Smith Micro Software	8 new characters; New User Interface; New Content Management System; Cross body morph tool; Global illumination; Improved OpenGL performance; Tone Mapping and exposure control; Normal Mapping; Wardrobe Wizard; Performance optimizations; wxPython support
Poser Pro 2010	March 10, 2010	Smith Micro Software	Enhanced User Interface: 8 new human figures with advanced rigging; Full set of legacy figures; Over 2.5 GB included content; Keyword and online content search; Parameter change indicator; Joint strength indicator; Recent render palette; StuffIt Connect image export; Facebook image export; Professional Art and Animation Tools: Full body part morph import; Auto-conform drag and drop; Conform with scaling; Updated PoserFusion Hosting plug-ins; Dynamic cloth and strand based hair; Improved OpenGL real-time scene preview; Face Room; WalkDesigner and TalkDesigner; Dependent Parameters Tool; Improved joint rigging system; Cross Body Part Morph Tool; Wardrobe Wizard Tool; wxPython support; Refined Lighting and Rendering Tools: HDRI Export; Gamma correction for linear rendering; Normal mapping; PSD layer rendering; Network rendering; 64 bit render engine; Indirect Lighting for Global Illumination; Physically correct light falloff; Tone mapping and exposure
Poser Debut	February 13, 2011	Smith Micro Software	80 fully rigged, fully posable, 3D characters; Includes 2 GB of content; In-app Project Guide teaches how to use Poser with video; Drag and drop content from Library; Poser FireFly rendering engine.; Poser 8 rigging system; OpenGL real-time scene preview; Supports spotlight lights, point lights and infinite lights
Poser 9	September 21, 2011	Smith Micro Software	Subsurface Scattering; Vertex Weight Map Rigging; In-app Project Guide; Expanded Context Menus; Multi-select Drag and Drop from Library; Grouping Objects; IDL and AO Rendering Support; OpenGL Scene Preview with Real-time Normal maps and Soft Shadows; Constraint Channels and Constraint Objects; Light Casting Objects; Tablet Support for Morph Tool; Rotate Object/Frame Object Camera Controls; Pre-render Texture Caching; Python 2.7 Support; Mac OS 10.7 Lion Support
Poser Pro 2012	September 21, 2011	Smith Micro Software	Includes all new features in Poser 9; Vertex Weight Map Creation Tools; Weight Map Auto-Transfer; Weight Map Creation; Weight Map Painting with Tablet Support; Poser Fusion Plug-ins; Lightwave; CINEMA 4D; Autodesk Maya; Autodesk 3ds Max; COLLADA import/export; Import Full Body Morph
Poser 10	May 21, 2013	Smith Micro Software	Includes all new features in Poser 9; Magnet and deformer weight map painting tools; Pixar subdivision surfaces; Bullet physics for rigid and soft body and hair dynamics; Cartoon preview; Magnet and deformer weight maps; Material compound nodes; Ray tracing preview pane; New human figures
Poser Pro 2014	May 21, 2013	Smith Micro Software	Includes all new features in Poser 10 and Poser Pro 2012; Fitting room; Copy morphs from figure to figure; Display hidden channels; Change calculation order of channels
Poser Pro Game Dev	August 5, 2014	Smith Micro Software	Includes all features of Poser Pro 2014; Polygon Reduction tools; FBX Import/Export; Unseen Polygon Removal; Kinect for Windows® support; Updated content distribution licensing to allow for use in and distribution via games.
Poser 11	November 17, 2015	Smith Micro Software	Includes all new features in Poser 10; SuperFly Render engine based on Cycles; Pixar Subdivision Surfaces Version 3; Multi-resolution Morphs for Subdivided Meshes; Customizable Shortcut Keys; Scalable User Interface; User Adaptable Rigging; Smooth Linear Transformation; Body Control Props; Cartoon Mode Control Panel
Poser Pro 11	November 17, 2015	Smith Micro Software	Includes all new features in Poser 11, Poser Pro 2014 and Poser Pro Game Dev; Custom Pose and Rig Symmetry; Custom Partial Scene Export; Export Morph Injection Files; Create User Adaptable Rigs
Poser Update 11.1	December 17, 2017	Smith Micro Software	3D path-based animation to simplify control of objects in a scene; User-customizable keyframe categories; Feature enhancements and bug fixes
Poser Update 11.2	Sep 19, 2019	Bondware Inc.	
Poser 12	January 29, 2021	Bondware Inc.	Includes all previous Pro-only features, unifying into a single version; Upgrade Superfly render engine to utilize hardware ray-tracing; Post Render Effects to speed or embellish renders for single frame or animation renders; Integrated Download Manager for Included Content; Improved Download Manager for Purchased Content; FBX import/export improvements as this becomes the primary method of exchanging content with other programs/tools; Material Room overhaul with material assignment power tools; Unimesh support features sprinkled throughout the code base; Refactored Poser Reference Manual using RoboHelp to simplify localization and render to multiple formats (HTML, PDF, etc)
Poser 13	March 30, 2023	Bondware Inc.	

== Poser figures ==
Poser's specially designed figures are commonly known as Poser Figures, Poser Models, Poser Content, Digital Actors, or Digital Puppets. Early versions of Poser were bundled with fully clothed humanoid figures specifically designed for the then-current version of Poser. Next, add-on packages of human figures were sold by the manufacturer of Poser. Soon, third party companies began creating figures which work with Poser. As clothing became separate from the humanoid figure, collections of 3D garments were created for specific models which conform to the shape and pose of the Poser figure. 'Poses' for figures were packaged and sold by the software vendor and by third parties. 'Morphs' allowing customization of body or face shape or other features are also for sale. Skin textures, frequently combined with settings for morph technology, are marketed to allow one base model to be customized into many 'characters'; similar 'texture' packages allow one garment to take on many appearances, an animal to represent different breeds of the same species, or a vehicle to show many colour schemes.

=== Development of figures ===
Each major release of Poser has come with a new generation of figures for use with the tool, however separate figures rapidly became available as the content market developed. Notably Zygote (later Daz 3D) made a Poser model of a young woman, higher-resolution than Posette, and called her "the Millennium Girl". Poser users often colloquially shortened this name to "Millie". Zygote, disliking this name, officially named her Victoria, which is often colloquially shortened to Vicky. Victoria then became the initial member of a large family of figures which has developed across multiple generations of technology. After they merged with Gizmoz in late 2009, Daz 3D released all their Poser figures as free downloads, but withdrew the free versions of their pre-Genesis figures when Genesis was released.

=== Content market ===
Because Poser figures are very inexpensive and useful for commercial illustrators, an entire cottage industry has developed to create and market Poser figures and other content. The market is a combination of several large distributors, who often also develop products, and of individual artists who often use one or more of the larger distributors to handle the sale of their products. Both the distributors and individual artists are involved in the creation of Poser figures, clothing, poses, morphs, textures and characters.

=== Figure families ===
Rather than unconnected single figures, Poser figures are now generally produced as families of models linked by technology generation and creator. Certain add-on products, most often poses and skin textures, but including some clothing models, may be usable across more than one model within a family, but in general are not usable across different generations of the same model. Examples of notable families of models are:

This collapsible table contains a long list of Poser characters. Click on "show" to show it.

Exhaustive list of Poser characters
Family	Category	Designer	Names	Notes	Distributor
Poser 11.1	Realistic Human	Smith Micro Software	Paul 2 (male), Pauline 2 (female)		Included with Poser
Poser 11	Realistic Human	Smith Micro Software	Paul (male), Pauline (female)	Paul released in content update 1	Included with Poser
Poser 10	Realistic Human	Smith Micro Software	Rex (male), Roxie (female)		Included with Poser
Poser 9	Realistic Human	Smith Micro Software	Ryan 2 (male), Alyson 2 (female)	Weight-mapped update of Poser 8 figures.	Included with Poser
Miki 4	Realistic human	Smith Micro Software	Miki 4	Weight-mapped update of Miki 3.	Content Paradise
Miki 3	Realistic human	eFrontier	Miki 3		Content Paradise
G2	Realistic human	eFrontier	James G2, Jessi G2, Koji G2, Kelvin G2, Simon G2, Sydney G2, Olivia G2	G2 male figures were partially cross-compatible, as were the G2 females.	Content Paradise
Dawn	Realistic human	HiveWire	Dawn	Weight-mapped female figure for Poser 9 and DazStudio 4.5	HiveWire store
Dusk	Realistic human	HiveWire	Dusk	Weight-mapped male figure for Poser 9 and DazStudio 4.5	HiveWire store
adanimals	Realistic animals	adh3d	adHorse	A new horse bundle for poser	adh3d poser models
adtoons	Toon anthro figures	adh3d	Joe the bear	A new toon figure for Poser 9+	adh3d poser models
adHuman	Realistic human	adh3d	adMan v2	The next genetation male for Poser 9+	adh3d poser models
adHuman	Realistic human	adh3d	adMAn	A free realistic male figure	adh3d poser models
adHuman	Realistic human	adh3d	adMan/adWoman WM	A free realistic human figure with a complete female morph pack and weight map rigging.	adh3d poser models
Miki 2.0	Realistic human	eFrontier	Miki 2.0	Often mistakenly included within the G2 family. She was created by eFrontier and represents a similar (but earlier) generation of technology, but is an upgraded version of Miki 1.0	Content Paradise
Miki 1.0	Realistic human	eFrontier	Miki 1.0		Content Paradise
Koji	Realistic human	eFrontier	Koji		Content Paradise
Poser 8	Realistic human	eFrontier	Ryan (man), Alyson (woman)		Content Paradise
Poser 7	Realistic human	eFrontier	Simon G2 (man), Sydney G2 (woman), Ben 2 (child), Kate 2 (child)	Included in Poser 7. The adult figures are the G2 figures listed above.	Content Paradise
Poser 6	Realistic human	eFrontier	James (man), Jessi (woman), Ben (child), Kate (child)	Included in Poser 6. The Poser 6 James and Jessi are distinct figures from the G2 James and Jessi; the G2 figures are a later generation of technology.	Content Paradise
Poser 5	Realistic human	eFrontier	Don (man), Judy (woman), Will (child), Penny (child).	included in Poser 5	Content Paradise
Poser 4	Realistic human	eFrontier	High-Resolution Man, High Resolution Woman.	Included in Poser 4. The names Dork and Posette remained in unofficial use.	Content Paradise
Poser 3	Realistic human	eFrontier	High-Resolution Man, High Resolution Woman.	Included in Poser 3. Over time the unofficial names 'Dork' and 'Posette' were adopted by the user community.	Content Paradise
Poser 2	Realistic human	eFrontier	Names not yet given to figures	Included in Poser 2	Content Paradise
Poser 1	Realistic human	eFrontier	Names not yet given to figures	Included in Poser 1	Content Paradise
Genesis 3 (Generation 7)	Primarily realistic human	DAZ originals	Core Figures: Genesis 3 Male; Genesis 3 Female	Weight-mapped figure with posable facial expressions and toes.	DAZ store
Genesis 2 (Generation 6)	Primarily realistic human	DAZ originals	Core Figures: Genesis 2 Male; Genesis 2 Female	Weight-mapped figure, usable in Poser with the DSON plugin available form DAZ3D. Restores the male/female split that was removed in the Genesis figure.	DAZ store
Genesis (Generation 5)	Primarily realistic human	DAZ originals	Core Figures: Genesis	Weight-mapped figure, usable in Poser with the DSON plugin available form DAZ3D. Morphable into male, female, and humanoid characters.	DAZ store
Millennium Figures (Generation 4)	Primarily realistic human	DAZ originals	Core Figures: Victoria 4, Michael 4, Kids 4; Morphs of Victoria 4: Aiko 4, Girl 4, She Freak 4; Stephanie 4; Morphs of Michael 4: Hiro 4, Freak 4	These morphs are injectable. This makes it easier to make clothing usable across multiple figures. The Kids 4 figure represents a pre-teen child and it has been stated that no specific teenage figure is under development, with the adult figures meant to be morphable into teens.	DAZ store
Millennium Figures (Generation 3)	Primarily realistic human	DAZ originals	Victoria 3, Michael 3, Aiko 3, Hiro 3, Stephanie Petite 3, David 3, the Girl, She Freak 2, Millennium Kids - Young Teens (aka Luke & Laura), Millennium Kids- Preschoolers (aka Matt & Maddie), Millenium Baby 3.0, Troll.	'The Girl', a stylized female figure, was developed by Kim Goossens in conjunction with Daz, but is marketed as and technologically indistinguishable from the other third generation Millennium figures.	DAZ store
Millennium Figures (Generation 2)	Primarily realistic human	DAZ originals	Victoria 2, Michael 2, Aiko 1, Stephanie 1, Millennium Girls, Millennium Boys, Millennium Baby.	These Victoria and Michael figures keep the mesh shapes of Generation 1, but add morphs and are an unusual case of some add-on compatibility being maintained across generations.	DAZ store
Millennium Figures (Generation 1)	Realistic human	DAZ originals	Victoria 1, Michael 1.	Victoria 1 was originally released as 'The Millennium Woman', but common colloquial shortening to "Millie" led to Daz 3D renaming her as Victoria.	DAZ store
ChibiBel	Stylized human	Yamato and BILLY-T		Anime-style preteen girl	PoserPros store
Terai Yuki 2	Stylized human	eFrontier	Terai Yuki 2		Content Paradise
Terai Yuki	Stylized human	eFrontier	Terai Yuki		Content Paradise
NearMe	Stylized human	eFrontier		Anime-style preteen girl	Content Paradise
Phoebe	cartoon humanoid	Netherworks			Included in Poser
LaRoo	cartoon humanoid	RuntimeDNA		Laroo 1 and 2 also included as lite version in Poser since V6	DAZ Store
Star	Cartoon humanoid	Lady Littlefox		Weight-mapped female toon figure for Poser 9 and DazStudio 4.5	DAZ Store
Cookie! and Chip!	Cartoon humanoid	Lady Littlefox		Gumdrops figures remade as young adults.	DAZ Store
Koshini and friends	Cartoon humanoid	Lady Littlefox	Koshini, Ichiro, Koshini 2, Ichiro 2, Krystal, Kiki, Kit		DAZ Store
Plushies	Cartoon animals	Lady Littlefox	Rufus		DAZ Store
Wacky World	Cartoon animals	3D Universe	Sal A. Manda, The Heavies Rhino, 3D Universe Toon Baby, Toon Croc, Toon Squirrel, Toon Dragon, Toon Penguin, Eggbert the toon Duckling, Jacko Lantern		DAZ store
Staci	Cartoon human	3D Universe			DAZ Store
Gumdrops	Stylized human children	Littlefox			DAZ Store
Project Human	Open-source realistic human	Sixus1	Project Human Male (PHM)/Project Human Female (PHF), HIM		Sixus1, Content Paradise
HER	Stylized human	Pascal Blanche		Though often mistakenly included in the Open Source Project Human family, HER is the poserized (by Sixus1) version of a figure by Pascal Blanche, who has given permission to distribute this version of the figure free of charge.	Sixus1, Content Paradise
Apollo Maximus	Realistic human	Anton Kisiel			Anton Kisiel Designs
Polymage	realistic human, cartoon humanoid	Mychelle-Anne Daigle (Neftis)	Elle, Esmeralda, Unity, NeftOoN Gal, NeftOoN Pal		Neftis3D
Cartoon humanoid	various	Meshbox Design	Toon Santa, Mrs Toon Santa, Taika the Elf Girl, Teppo the Elf Boy, Toon Bunny		Mirye Software

== See also ==
- 3D modeling
- List of 3D modeling software
