= Victoria Building =

Victoria Building may refer to:

- Victoria Building (Ottawa), Canada
- Victoria Building, University of Liverpool, United Kingdom
- Victoria Building, St. Louis, Missouri
