= Victorio (disambiguation) =

Victorio (c. 1825–1880), was a warrior and chief of the Apaches in and around Texas and New Mexico.

Victorio may also refer to:

== People ==
=== First name ===
==== Politics ====
- Victorio Codovilla (1894–1970), Italian-born Argentine socialist and later communist politician
- Victorio Montalvo Rojas (born 1966), Mexican lawyer and politician
- Victorio Taccetti (1943), Argentine career diplomat

==== Sports ====
- Victorio Casa (1943–2013), Argentine professional footballer
- Victorio Cieslinskas (1922–2007), Uruguayan basketball player of Lithuanian descent
- Victorio Cocco (born 1946), Argentine footballer
- Victório Ferraz (1924–2006), Brazilian competitive sailor
- Victorio Ruiz García (1926–unknown), Spanish racing cyclist
- Victorio Ocaño (born 1954), Argentine footballer
- Victorio "Maxi" Pereira (born 1984), Uruguayan footballer
- Victorio Ramis (born 1994), Argentine footballer
- Víctorio Solares (born 1932), Guatemalan middle-distance runner
- Victorio Spinetto (1911–1990), Argentine football player and manager
- Victorio Unamuno (1909–1988), Spanish footballer

==== Other fields ====
- Victorio Blanco (1893–1977), Mexican film actor
- Victorio Edades (1895–1985), Filipino painter
- Victorio Macho (1887–1966), Spanish sculptor
- Victorio Riego Prieto (1932–2009), Paraguayan chess player

=== Middle name ===
- Lucio Victorio Mansilla (1831–1913), Argentinean general, journalist, politician and diplomat

== Other uses ==
- Victorio Peak, a high rocky outcropping in the Hembrillo Basin in southern New Mexico
- Victorio Peak Formation, a geologic formation found in the Delaware Basin in Texas and New Mexico
- Victorio Peak treasure, a cache of gold reportedly found inside Victorio Peak in 1937
- Victorio's War, an armed conflict that took place 1879–1880

== See also ==
- Victoria (disambiguation)
