= The Victor =

The Victor or The Victors may refer to:

== Film and television ==
- "The Victor", March 8, 1989 episode on List of Dragon Ball episodes
- The Victor (1923 film), American silent comedy film directed by Edward Laemmle
- The Victor (1932 film), German musical comedy, original title Der Sieger
- The Victors (1918 film), German silent drama, original title Die Sieger
- The Victors (1963 film), British-American all-star World War II drama by Carl Foreman

== Constructions ==
- The Victor, 1909 American condominiums in New Jersey for RCA Victor (Nipper Building)
- The Victor, 1928 Serbian monument in Belgrade, original name Pobednik
- The Victor (statue), a steel statue in Pasig, Philippines

== Songs ==
- "The Victor", 1975 American Christian song by Jamie Owens-Collins
- "The Victors", 1898 American fight song at University of Michigan

== Other uses ==
- The Victor (comics), British weekly comic magazine published from 1961 to 1992

== See also ==
- Victor (disambiguation)
- The Victoria (disambiguation)
