= Lake Victoria (disambiguation) =

Lake Victoria is a lake in Africa.

Lake Victoria or Victoria Lake may also refer to:

- in Australia:
  - Lake Victoria (New South Wales), a lake in New South Wales, Australia
  - Lake Victoria (Victoria), a shallow saline lake on the Bellarine Peninsula in Victoria, Australia
  - Lake Victoria, one of the Gippsland Lakes in Victoria, Australia
- Lake Victoria, Michigan, United States, a small lake and census-designated place
- Lake Victoria (Minnesota), a lake in Douglas County, Minnesota
- Laguna Victoria, a lake in Bolivia
- Victoria Lake (Newfoundland and Labrador), a lake in Canada
- Victoria Lake (New Zealand), a lake in Hagley Park, Christchurch, New Zealand
- Lake Victoria (Ontario), a lake in Ontario, Canada
- Zorkul, a lake on the border between Afghanistan and Tajikistan once known as Lake Victoria

== See also ==
- Queen Victoria Sea
