= Victoria College =

Victoria College is or was the name of several institutions of secondary or higher education, and may refer to:

== Asia ==
- Victoria International College, Kuala Lumpur, Malaysia
- Government Victoria College, Palakkad, India
- Victoria College, Chulipuram, Sri Lanka
- Victoria College, Comilla, Bangladesh
- Victoria College, Narail, Bangladesh
- Victoria College, Hong Kong, former name of Queen's College
- Victoria Institution, former English school in Kuala Lumpur, Malaysia, now a national school.
- Victoria School, Singapore
- Victoria Junior College, Singapore
- Victoria Technical School, Hong Kong, former name of Tang Siu Kin Victoria Government Secondary School
- Victoria International College, Dang, Nepal

== Africa ==
- Victoria College, Alexandria, Egypt
- Victoria College, Stellenbosch, now Stellenbosch University, Western Cape, South Africa

== Australia/New Zealand ==
- Victoria College, Melbourne, now-defunct college in Australia
- Victoria College, Wellington, New Zealand, later Victoria University College, now Victoria University of Wellington
- Victorian College of the Arts, University of Melbourne, Australia

== Europe ==
- Victoria College, Belfast, a grammar school in Northern Ireland
- Victoria College, Jersey, Channel Islands
- Victoria College of Music and Drama, UK
- Victoria Park College, Manchester, UK

== North America ==
- Victoria College, the undergraduate college of Victoria University, Toronto in the University of Toronto
- Victoria College, British Columbia, Canada, later became the University of Victoria
- Victoria College of Art, Victoria, British Columbia, Canada
- Victoria College (Texas), a community college in Victoria, Texas, US
- Royal Victoria College, an all-female residence of McGill University, in Montreal, Quebec, Canada

== See also ==
- Victoria University (disambiguation)
