= Victorias (disambiguation) =

Victorias may refer to:

== Sports teams ==
- Edmonton Victorias, a women's ice hockey team in Edmonton, Alberta, Canada
- Moncton Victorias, a men's ice hockey team in Moncton, New Brunswick, Canada
- Montreal Victorias, a men's ice hockey team in Montreal, Quebec, Canada
- New York City Victorias, a men's American football team in NYC, NYS, USA; part of the American Football Union
- Ottawa Victorias, a men's ice hockey team in Ottawa, Ontario, Canada
- Pittsburgh Victorias, a men's ice hockey team in Pittsburgh, Pennsylvania, USA
- Regina Victorias, men's ice hockey teams in Regina, Saskatchewan, Canada
- St. Vital Victorias, a men's ice hockey team in St. Vital, Winnipeg, Manitoba, Canada
- Winnipeg Victorias, a men's ice hockey team in Winnipeg, Manitoba, Canada
- Winnipeg Victorias Rugby Club, a men's Canadian football team in Winnipeg, Manitoba, Canada

== Other uses ==
- Victorias, Negros Occidental, Negros Island, Philippines; a city
- Las Victorias, Alta Verapaz, Guatemala; a national park
- Estadio Las Victorias, Chiquimula, Guatemala; a soccer stadium

== See also ==
- Victoria's Secret, a clothing company, primarily women's lingerie
- Victoria (disambiguation)
