= Victoria Peak (disambiguation) =

Victoria Peak may refer to:

- Victoria Peak, the highest point on the island of Hong Kong
- Victoria Peak (Belize)
- Victoria Peak (Alberta)
- Victoria Peak (British Columbia)
- Victoria Peak (Arizona)
- Victoria Peak (California)
- Victoria Peak (South Africa)
- Victoriapeak, a planet in the Lionrock star system in the constellation Aquarius
- Mount Victoria (Palawan), mount in Palawan island , Philippines

== See also ==
- Mount Victoria (disambiguation)
- Victoria Hill (disambiguation)
- Victoria (disambiguation)
