= Mount Victoria =

Mount Victoria may refer to either peaks or communities named after Queen Victoria of the United Kingdom.

== Peaks ==
In Canada

- Mount Victoria (British Columbia)
- Mount Victoria (Bow Range), on the Alberta–British Columbia border

In New Zealand

- Mount Victoria (Auckland)
- Mount Victoria (Wellington hill)

Elsewhere

- Mount Tomanivi, formerly Mount Victoria, in Fiji
- Mount Victoria, Palawan, Philippines
- Mount Victoria, Papua New Guinea
- Mount Victoria (Tasmania), Australia
- Nat Ma Taung, also known as Mount Victoria, in Myanmar/Burma

== Communities ==
- Mount Victoria, New South Wales, Australia
- Mount Victoria, Maryland, United States
- Mount Victoria (Wellington suburb), New Zealand

== Electoral districts ==
- Mount Victoria (New Zealand electorate), a former parliamentary electorate, 1946–1954

== See also ==
- Mount Victoria, Wellington (disambiguation)
- Victoria Peak (disambiguation)
- Victoria Hill (disambiguation)
- Victoria (disambiguation)
- Mount (disambiguation)
