= The Exigency =

2019 American animated film by Cody Vibbart

- Promotional release poster
- Directed by: Cody Vibbart
- Written by: Cody Vibbart
- Produced by: Cody Vibbart
- Starring: Tom Haney; Alexis Danner; Warren Halderman; Kayla Vibbart; Dillon Vibbart; Keith Todd; Matthew Kendrick; Alix Spurlock; Joel Danner; Joshua Guthrie; Lucas Danner
- Edited by: Cody Vibbart
- Music by: Charles Carpenter
- Production company: Cuz Productions
- Distributed by: Cuz Productions (through Amazon Prime Video and Blu-ray)
- Release date: December 14, 2019
- Running time: 112 minutes
- Country: United States
- Language: English

The Exigency is a 2019 American independent animated science fiction-action film written, directed, produced, and edited by Cody Vibbart. It features the voices of Tom Haney, Alexis Danner, Warren Halderman, Kayla Vibbart, Dillon Vibbart, Keith Todd, Matthew Kendrick, Alix Spurlock, Joel Danner, Joshua Guthrie, and Lucas Danner. The film centers around Kyle, a working man who reveals to his family that he is a retired war hero from the planet Gallesha and that he has to save it from an alien tyrant named Diederick.

Cody Vibbart began developing the project in 2006 through his production banner Cuz Productions, under the working title Sleeping Giant. Without a finalized story, and a timeframe to finish the film in two-three years, he spent a lot of his time rewriting and reanimating several scenes. After 13 years, he finished working on the film in 2019, having decided to divide the story into a trilogy.

The Exigency was self-released on Amazon Prime Video and Blu-ray on December 14, 2019. It received generally positive reviews from critics, who while noting the flaws in its voice work and animation, praised its story, action sequences, and self-awareness alongside Vibbart's dedication to finish the film. A sequel, titled The Exigency II: Course of Action, is currently in development.

== Plot ==
At his place of work, Kyle Burton receives a promotion as two alien spaceships begin wreaking havoc on Earth. After managing to destroy one of the spaceships, he drives home and picks up his wife Melissa. The pair then chase the school bus carrying their two kids, Timmy and Becky, and have the children jump into their car. A resulting car accident knocks most of the family unconscious as a different, larger spaceship approaches and abducts Kyle and his family.

After gaining consciousness, Kyle is told by Nyklus, Assistant General in the Space Force Division, that the spaceship was sent by King Sargon, ruler of the planet Gallesha, to rescue and retrieve Kyle as a final attempt to help end a war with the neighboring planet of Anumbis, ruled by an alien tyrant named Diederick. Kyle reveals to his family that he is a retired human war hero from Gallesha, where he served as a commanding general. A curious Timmy visits Captain Keon and learns that they have traveled outside the Milky Way. Through the use of a warp drive, the crew travels across dozens of lightyears before arriving in the planetary system containing Gallesha.

Kyle meets with Sargon and tells him that he does not want to participate in the war against Anumbis. Sargon responds by telling Kyle that Diederick wants to take over the Universe and could potentially target Earth. After talking with Diederick over a video call, Kyle agrees to visit a banquet hosted by Sargon to announce his decision to the public. During a train ride, Kyle tells Melissa that when he was a child, his family was murdered during a surprise attack from a nearby planet, leaving him and his brother, Nell, as the only survivors. After running away, a man named Mangular offered to give Kyle and Nell a place to hide until the battle was over and would later go on to raise them into disciplined, strong men. After becoming a soldier for Gallesha, and being promoted to commanding general, Kyle gained a mindset that without any wars, he would have no one to fight. As a result, he fought Diederick for apparently no reason to create tension between Gallesha and Anumbis, which eventually escalated into war.

In the present, Kyle meets with Nell and tells him that instead of fighting in the war against Anumbis, he wants to help them come up with a strategy. This initially disappoints Nell, who believes Kyle is the only one who can help end the war. At the banquet, Kyle restates his decision and is told that a spaceship will take him back to Earth in half an hour. Meanwhile, Timmy is given a toy that can produce "musical bubbles" by Vayana, Kyle's ex-lover. After taking the toy away, Kyle notices that it contains a tracking device. Before he can throw it away, several explosions detonate at the banquet, knocking him out for a few seconds. Diederick and his army arrive and capture Kyle's family in the process.

After sustaining multiple shot wounds, Kyle watches as Diederick's army deploys a four-armed alien cyborg. He manages to escape and is ordered to lead the cyborg towards Gallesha's army. After doing so, Kyle sees that the cyborg has managed to overpower and kill dozens of soldiers. Kyle battles the cyborg by throwing a grenade at it and shooting it several times. The cyborg overpowers him, but Kyle manages to destroy it with a second grenade. Soon after, Kyle visits and confronts Sargon about the recent attack, believing there to be an inside job. He later receives a video call from Diederick, who reassures him that his family is safe but that he will only see them again if Gallesha surrenders. As a result, Kyle decides to lead Gallesha's army into battle as commanding general.

== Voice cast ==
- Tom Haney as Kyle
- Alexis Danner as Melissa
- Warren Halderman as Timmy
- Kayla Vibbart as Becky
- Dillon Vibbart as King Sargon
- Keith Todd as Diederick
- Matthew Kendrick as Nell
- Alix Spurlock as Vayana
- Joel Danner as Petrod
- Joshua Guthrie as Keon
- Lucas Danner as Nyklus

== Production ==
=== Background and inspiration ===
Cody Vibbart is an American filmmaker from Ventura, California. He began writing stories, drawing, and acting at a young age. When he was nine, Vibbart began making films with his brother using a home video camera. As an adult, he works full-time as a supervising video editor for a social media platform and currently lives with his fiancé, Corina. He has credited his mother as a large influence and has stated that she introduced him to animation and Poser, a 3D computer graphics software.

In 1998, Vibbart attended the Santa Barbara International Film Festival with his mother. At the event, he learned about an individual who, by themselves, created a short 3D-animated film entirely on Bryce, a software Vibbart later installed to learn more about animating. Soon after, he discovered Poser and used it along with Bryce to render and animate small projects, including his first two animated feature films: Forsaken, an hour-long survival film completed after eight months, and a 90-minute horror film based on the Silent Hill franchise that was completed after eighteen months. Vibbart has said that both films were "pretty bad" and are not available online.

=== Development and animation ===
The Exigency was written, directed, and produced by Vibbart under his production banner Cuz Productions. The idea for the film arrived in 2006, originally under the working title Sleeping Giant, and revolved around a person who woke up to the sight of two UFOs targeting them specifically. Without a finalized story and a timeframe to finish the film in two-three years, The Exigency was delayed from an original 2009 due date to 2012, in which he spent a lot of his time rewriting and reanimating several scenes. Having delayed it several times again, Vibbart finished working on the film in 2019, after thirteen years.

Vibbart was one of the only people to work on The Exigency and joked that he contributed 98 percent of the finished product. As Sleeping Giant, he animated ten minutes worth of footage using character modules from the Poser4 base model. Finding it to feel "outdated," he upgraded his animating software after the first two years to use the tools available with Poser7, including new characters and the ability to render at a higher resolution, and got rid of all the footage from Sleeping Giant, using only a single shot from that version in the final film. During the Great Recession, Vibbart became unemployed and decided to use his newly acquired time to work on the film. Six years after he began working on the project, Vibbart asked himself how much time he was willing to invest to finish it; his determination made him decide to divide his original story into a trilogy to give himself more time.

According to Vibbart, the banquet scene was the most tedious to animate, due to Poser's inefficiency to produce, position, and animate large amounts of characters. This resulted in a problem with animating the crowd clapping but Vibbart simply ignored the issue and moved on. Additionally, rendering the film took hours at a time, so Vibbart would set up large scenes to render on days he was planning to be out of the house since he wanted his computer to be working at all times. Overall, twelve years were spent on animation alone. After the final composited shot was completed on July 6, 2018, the thirteenth year of production was spent on post-production.

=== Music and post-production ===
The film score to The Exigency was composed by Charles Carpenter. This marked the first project where Vibbart had a composer create an original score, as he did not want to spend his time searching for royalty-free music that failed to match the tone of the film. Temporary sound effects were added into the film by Vibbart throughout three months. While the final audio mix was created by his co-worker, Anthony Schulze, Vibbart is also credited as the film's editor.

== Reception ==
The Exigency was self-released on Amazon Prime Video and Blu-ray on December 14, 2019. Richard Propes, writing for The Independent Critic, awarded the film a "B−" and admired Vibbart's commitment to completing the film: "Even at its worst, Vibbart managed to create a film that is intriguing to watch and with a story, that while simple and familiar, is consistently involving." From Renderosity Magazine, Sergio Rosa described the film as being "weirdly watchable," and that while entertaining, the story was "not great." At the end of his review, Rosa wrote: "Even with all its flaws, I'd recommend you watch The Exigency, not because it's a great movie, but because it is the product of around 13 years of dedication. In a world full of 'I'd like to-ers,' Cody Vibbart took the next step and became part of the minority that actually did it."

== Sequel ==
A sequel, titled The Exigency II: Course of Action, is currently in development. After finding that most reviews on The Exigency criticized the visual effects and runtime, Vibbart responded in a blog by saying the story would force the film to be longer than two hours but that he would focus on improving the animation for the sequel. In February 2020, Vibbart said he had set a goal to complete the film in two to four years while also "bringing on more artists to help create environments and scenes." In March 2020, he decided to keep his promise to improve the visuals by dropping Poser for Blender, a modern 3D computer graphics software.
