= Victoria Hill (disambiguation) =

Victoria Hill is an actress.

Victoria Hill may also refer to:

- Victoria Blyth Hill (born 1945), American art conservator
- Victoria Hill, location in New Westminster, Canada
- Victoria Hill, Queensland, a locality in the Toowoomba and Southern Downs Region, Australia
- Victoria Hill (Riverside County), United States

== See also ==
- Mount Victoria (disambiguation)
- Victoria Peak (disambiguation)
- Victoria (disambiguation)
- Hill (disambiguation)
