= Victoria Road, Ontario =

Victoria Road
- Location of Victoria Road in Ontario
- Coordinates: 44°35′46″N 78°56′19″W
- Country: Canada
- Province: Ontario
- Municipality: Kawartha Lakes
- Founded: 1872
- Elevation: 259 m (850 ft)
- Time zone: UTC-5 (Eastern Time Zone)
  - Summer (DST): UTC-4 (Eastern Time Zone)
- FSA: K0M
- Area code: 705

Victoria Road is an unincorporated community in the Canadian province of Ontario, located within the single-tier municipality of Kawartha Lakes. The village was built around a station on the Toronto and Nipissing Railway, which was constructed in 1872 where the line crossed Victoria Colonization Road (today Kawartha Lakes Road 35), which was built between 1859 and 1861, named after the county that was named after Queen Victoria, and passes through the village. For a time, the village was known as "The City of Peace" and "The Road." The station—the second last on the line—served the community and area until the last train passed through in 1965, after which the tracks were lifted.

Victoria Road is located on the north-eastern tip of Mitchell Lake. Like most of the surrounding area, the soil is extremely thin, at times less than 2 inches (5 cm) thick, resulting in very little farmland in the area. At the peak of the village, it contained several small industries and three hotels.

An 1881 survey map lists it as the village of Bexley, with the railroad station listed as Victoria Road Station.

== See also ==
- List of communities in Ontario
- Royal eponyms in Canada
