= Victoria School Systems =

Private bilingual school systems in Vietnam

Location
- 803A Nguyễn Hữu Thọ street, Phước Kiển, Nhà Bè district Ho Chi Minh City, Việt Nam
- Coordinates: 10.697403836308338°N 106.73019181744128°E

Information
- Type: Private school; International school
- Established: 2022; 3 years ago
- Status: Active
- Principal: Lê Nguyễn Trung Nguyên
- Campus: Victoria School - Saigon South; Victoria School - Riverside; Victoria Preschool - SwanBay
- Website: victoriaschool.edu.vn

Victoria School is a collection of K-12 educational systems in Vietnam that was established in 2022. The system includes International Bilingual Schools: Victoria School – Saigon South, Victoria School – Riverside, and Victoria Preschool – SwanBay. The system is designed based on the "Happy School" model by the United Nations Educational, Scientific and Cultural Organization (UNESCO), to promote the well-being and holistic development of students, teachers, staff, school leaders, and parents. The system strives to fulfill 3 criteria: Green, Smart and Happy.

The school combines the Ministry of Education and Training's National Curriculum along with the Cambridge International Curriculum; Happy Global Citizenship Curriculum; Music, Art & Sports Education Curriculum; and Enterprise Experiential Education Curriculum for children from Primary to Upper Secondary. The school also applies the Montessori method, Cambridge International Early Years Curriculum, and Fast Track Kids Program in teaching preschoolers.

The School Superintendent is M.Ed Lê Nguyễn Trung Nguyên (Jessica), graduated from RMIT International University. She has 25 years of experience in education as well as research, development, and school management. She held senior management positions at major educational organizations in Vietnam before taking over the management of the Victoria School Systems.

In August 2023, Victoria School - Saigon South was officially inaugurated in Nhà Bè district, Hồ Chí Minh City. The school was designed by architect Võ Trọng Nghĩa, and the 20,000 square meter campus is covered by a green tree system, creating a cool, airy green space.

In October 2023, Victoria Preschool in SwanBay Urban Area (Nhơn Trạch district, Đồng Nai) was officially opened and admitted students from 18 months to 6 years old. In December 2023, the Victoria School - Riverside for students from primary to high school was launched, envisioned to be located in District 8, Ho Chi Minh City, and will start operating in 2024.

== Partners ==
- Cambridge (December 2022)
- UNESCO (December 2022)
- American Chamber of Commerce in Vietnam (AmCham Vietnam) (July 2023)
- Positive Action (July 2023)
- SIKS International School (July 2023)
- Hudson Global Scholars (2023)
- British Council (2023)
