= Victoria 18 =

Recreational keelboat 1st built 1977

Development
- Designer: G. William McVay
- Location: United States
- Year: 1977
- No. built: circa 600
- Builder: Victoria Yachts
- Name: Victoria 18

Boat
- Crew: 1-3
- Displacement: 1,200 lb (544 kg)
- Draft: 2.00 ft (0.61 m)

Hull
- Type: monohull
- Construction: fiberglass
- LOA: 18.50 ft (5.64 m)
- LWL: 12.83 ft (3.91 m)
- Beam: 5.50 ft (1.68 m)
- Engine: optional outboard motor

Hull appendages
- Keel: long keel
- Ballast: 550 lb (249 kg)
- Rudder: keel-mounted rudder

Rig
- Rig type: Bermuda rig
- I foretriangle height: 17.00 ft (5.18 m)
- J foretriangle base: 5.50 ft (1.68 m)
- P mainsail luff: 20.00 ft (6.10 m)
- E mainsail foot: 9.00 ft (2.74 m)

Sails
- Sailplan: fractional rigged sloop
- Mainsail area: 90.00 sq ft (8.361 m^{2})
- Jib/genoa area: 46.75 sq ft (4.343 m^{2})
- Total sail area: 136.75 sq ft (12.704 m^{2})

The Victoria 18 is a recreational keelboat built by designer G. William McVay's son, Bill McVay, at his company, Victoria Yachts in DeBary, Florida, United States. Production ran from 1977 until 1983, with about 600 examples of the design completed, but it is now out of production.

A small number were built as the Victoria 17, with a shorter hull and an outboard rudder.

The Victoria 18 is a cabin development of G. William McVay's 1967 open boat design, the Minuet.

The Victoria 18 is built predominantly of fiberglass, with wood trim. The hull has a spooned raked stem; a raised counter, angled transom; a keel-hung rudder controlled by a tiller and a fixed long keel. It displaces 1,200 lb (544 kg) and carries 550 lb (249 kg) of ballast.

An optional stern mount allows fitting a small outboard motor of up to 4.5 hp (3 kW) for docking and maneuvering.

The design has sleeping accommodation for two people, plus a cooler. A cockpit boom tent was a factory option. Ventilation is provided by four opening ports. For stowage the design has a lazarette.

For sailing the design is equipped with a cockpit 6 ft (1.8 m) in length, genoa tracks, winches and jib roller reefing. For racing additional equipment allowed under the class rules can include an adjustable backstay, a boom vang, barber haulers and a spinnaker. The boat is usually raced with a crew of 1-3 sailors. Most had a fractional sloop rig, but a few were built as cutters with a bowsprit. It has tapered anodized aluminum spars.
