= Victoria Island structure =

Impact crater near Stockton, California

- Location within California
- Location: San Joaquin County, California, United States; 37°53′24″N 121°32′06″W

Impact crater structure
- Confidence: probable
- Diameter: 5.5 kilometers (3.4 mi)
- Exposed: No
- Drilled: No

The Victoria Island structure is a 5.5 km (3 mi) bowl-shaped structure buried in the shale sediments of the Sacramento-San Joaquin River Delta, 12 miles (19 km) west of Stockton, California. The circular structure is part of a former sea bed, and lies 1,490–1,600 meters (4,890–5,250 ft) below sea level.

Discovered during oil exploration and reported at the Lunar and Planetary Science Conference in Houston, Texas, in March 2007, it is thought to be a buried impact crater formed between 37 and 49 million years ago.

Victoria Island, which the structure is named for, is in the San Joaquin River Delta at approximately 37.890°N 121.535°W. The current publications do not list a more precise location for the impact structure than the island.

== See also ==
- List of possible impact structures on Earth
