= Victoria International College, Kuala Lumpur =

College in Kuala Lumpur, Malaysia

Coordinates: 3°12′14.1″N 101°40′29.6″E

Victoria International Colleges
- Established: 1976
- Location: No. 984, 986 & 988, Jalan Kampung Batu, Taman Batu Off 5th Miles, Jalan Ipoh, Kuala Lumpur, 51200, Malaysia
- Website: www.vicmy.com

Victoria International College is private college located in Kuala Lumpur, Malaysia. Its diploma programs are approved and recognized by the MOHE and MQA, and the skill courses are approved by the MOHR and PTPTK department.

== Courses ==
The list of the courses conducted in Victoria International College:

- Certificate in Business Studies
- Certificate in Hotel and Catering Management
- Certificate in Travel Operation
- Diploma in Risk Management
- Diploma in Information and Communication Technology
- Diploma in Games Design
- Diploma in Business Administration
- Diploma in Hotel & Catering Management
- Diploma In Business Information Technology
- Diploma in Culinary Arts
- Diploma in Accountancy
- Diploma in Human Resource Management
- English Language Programme Level 1, 2 and 3
- Bahasa Malaysia Level 1, 2 and 3
- SKM Programmes
- Setiausaha Koprat - Tahap 3, 4 & 5
- Kulinari - Tahap 2, 3, 4 & 5
- Multimedia - Tahap 2, 3, & 4
- Rangkaian Komputer - Tahap 3 & 4
