= Victoria Dock =

Victoria Dock may refer to:

== Australia ==
- Victoria Dock (Hobart)
- Victoria Dock (Melbourne) - previously part of the Port of Melbourne, now part of the Melbourne Docklands redevelopment and called Victoria Harbour

== India ==
- Victoria Dock, Mumbai

== South Africa ==
- Victoria & Alfred Waterfront, Cape Town

== United Kingdom ==
- Royal Victoria Dock, London
- Victoria Dock, Liverpool, Liverpool
- Victoria Dock, Hull, Kingston upon Hull
