= Victoria Bridge =

Victoria Bridge may be a reference to:

== Bridges ==
Australia

- Victoria Bridge, Brisbane, a road bridge across the Brisbane River in Brisbane
- Victoria Bridge, Devonport, a road bridge across the Mersey River in Devonport, Tasmania
- Victoria Bridge, Launceston, a road bridge across the North Easak River in Launceston, Tasmania
- Victoria Bridge, Melbourne, a road bridge across the Yarra River, in Melbourne
- Victoria Bridge, Penrith, also known as Nepean River Bridge, a road and pedestrian bridge (may also refer to the adjacent rail bridge)
- Victoria Bridge, Picton, a timber trestle bridge that crosses Stonequarry Creek in Picton, New South Wales
- Victoria Bridge, Townsville, a historic bridge across the Ross Creek in northern Queensland

New Zealand

- Hamish Hay Bridge, Christchurch, formerly known as Victoria Street Bridge
- Victoria Bridge, Cambridge, New Zealand, a road bridge across the Waikato River in Cambridge
- Victoria Bridge, Hamilton, a road bridge across the Waikato River in Hamilton

United Kingdom

- Royal Victoria Dock Bridge, a footbridge across the Royal Victoria Dock near the ExCeL Exhibition Centre in London, England
- Victoria Bridge, Aberdeen, correctly known as Queen Victoria Bridge
- Victoria Bridge, Bath, a cable-stayed bridge over the River Avon in Bath, England
- Victoria Bridge, Cambridge, England, a road bridge across the River Cam in Cambridge, England
- Victoria Bridge, Datchet, a road bridge across the River Thames at Datchet in Berkshire, England
- Victoria Bridge, Glasgow, a road bridge across the River Clyde in Glasgow, Scotland
- Victoria Bridge, Hereford, a foot bridge in Hereford
- Victoria Bridge, Manchester, a road bridge across the River Irwell in Greater Manchester
- Victoria Bridge, Mar Lodge Estate, an iron road bridge across the River Dee on Mar Lodge Estate, Aberdeenshire, Scotland
- Victoria Bridge (Stockton-on-Tees), a road bridge across the River Tees between Stockton-on-Tees and Thornaby-on-Tees in Northern England
- Victoria Bridge, Worcestershire, railway bridge in Worcestershire, England
- Victoria Swing Bridge, a disused swing bridge across the Water of Leith in Edinburgh
- Victoria Viaduct, a disused railway bridge near Washington, Tyne and Wear, England
- Victoria Bridge, Aberlour, a footbridge near Aberlour, Scotland
- Chelsea Bridge, a road bridge in London formerly called Victoria Bridge
- Grosvenor Bridge, a rail bridge across the River Thames in London, England, that is sometimes called the Victoria Rail Bridge

Rest of world

- Victoria Bridge, Mandi, a suspension bridge spanning the Beas River in India
- Victoria Bridge, Malaysia, a rail bridge across the Perak River in Perak, Malaysia
- Victoria Bridge (Montreal), a road and rail bridge across the Saint Lawrence River at Montreal in Canada
- Traffic Bridge (Saskatoon), popularly known as Victoria Bridge, a road bridge across the South Saskatchewan River in Saskatoon, Canada
- Victoria Bridge, Jhelum, popularly known as Haranpur Bridge a railway bridge on the Jhelum River in Punjab, Pakistan

== Places ==
- Victoria Bridge, County Tyrone, a small village in Northern Ireland
- Victoria Bridge, Nova Scotia, Canada, a community on Cape Breton Island
