= Victoria Tower (disambiguation) =

Victoria Tower is the tallest tower of the Palace of Westminster in London, England.

Victoria Tower may also refer to:

- Victoria Tower (Adelaide), the clock tower on the Adelaide GPO
- Victoria Tower (Canada), former part of the Parliament Buildings in Ottawa
- Victoria Tower (Guernsey), an historic landmark in Guernsey
- Victoria Tower (Hong Kong), a historic building in Hong Kong
- Victoria Tower (Liverpool), a clock tower by Salisbury Dock in Liverpool, England
- Victoria Tower (Pakistan), in Jacobabad, Sindh, Pakistan
- Victoria Tower, part of the Municipal Buildings complex in Greenock, Scotland
- Victoria Tower, on Castle Hill, Huddersfield, West Yorkshire, England
- Victoria Towers, a large residential development in Hong Kong
- Victoria Tower (Stockholm), a hotel in Stockholm, the tallest in Northern Europe

== See also ==
- Victoria Clock Tower
