= Vasco Fernandes Coutinho =

Vasco Fernandes Coutinho may refer to:

- Vasco Fernandes Coutinho, 1st Count of Marialva (c. 1385-1450), Marshal of Portugal
- Vasco Fernandes Coutinho, captain of Espírito Santo (1490-1561), founder of the Brazilian state of Espirito Santo
