= Vitória Futebol Clube =

Vitória Futebol Clube may refer to:

- Vitória Futebol Clube (ES), a Brazilian football club from Vitória, Espírito Santo
- Vitória F.C., a Portuguese football club from Setúbal, Lisbon
- Vitória FC (Riboque), a São Toméan and Príncipean football club from Riboque, São Tomé
