= The Victoria, Richmond =

Coordinates: 51°27′26″N 0°18′14″W

The Victoria
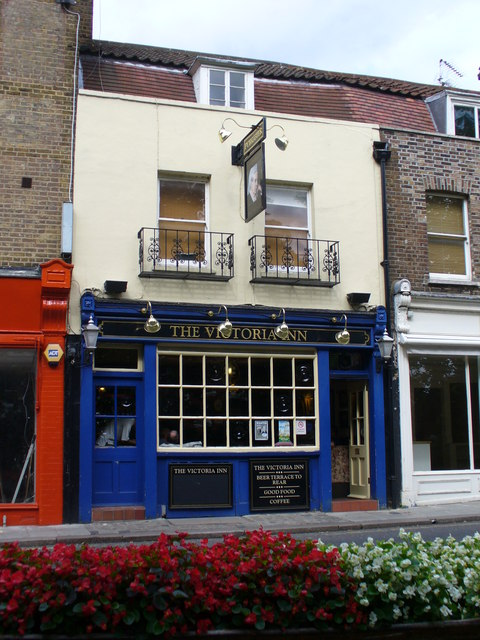

- Location within London Borough of Richmond upon Thames

General information
- Type: Public house
- Location: 78 Hill Rise, Richmond, London, England

Listed Building – Grade II
- Official name: Britannia public house
- Designated: 25 June 1983
- Reference no.: 1358054

The Victoria is a Grade II listed public house in Richmond, in the London Borough of Richmond upon Thames. It is in an 18th-century terrace at 78 Hill Rise on Richmond Hill.
