= Victoria Memorial (disambiguation) =

There are many memorials to Queen Victoria, including:

- Victoria Memorial, Kolkata
- Victoria Memorial, London
- Victoria Monument, Liverpool
- Victoria Memorial (Montreal)
- Queen Victoria Memorial (Melbourne)
- Queen Victoria Memorial, Lancaster
- Queen Victoria Statue, Bristol
- Frogmore Mausoleum, Queen Victoria's burial place

== See also ==
- List of statues of Queen Victoria
- Victoria Tower (Guernsey)
- Victoria Memorial Hall (Singapore)
- Victoria Memorial Museum (Ottawa)
- Victoria Memorial Square (Toronto)
