= Volume correction factor =

Standardized factor in thermodynamics

In thermodynamics, the Volume Correction Factor (VCF), also known as Correction for the effect of Temperature on Liquid (CTL), is a standardized computed factor used to correct for the thermal expansion of fluids, primarily, liquid hydrocarbons at various temperatures and densities. It is typically a number between 0 and 2, rounded to five decimal places which, when multiplied by the observed volume of a liquid, will return a "corrected" value standardized to a base temperature (usually 60 °Fahrenheit or 15 °Celsius).

== Conceptualization ==
In general, VCF / CTL values have an inverse relationship with observed temperature relative to the base temperature. That is, observed temperatures above 60 °F (or the base temperature used) typically correlate with a correction factor below "1", while temperatures below 60 °F correlate with a factor above "1". This concept lies in the basis for the kinetic theory of matter and thermal expansion of matter, which states as the temperature of a substance rises, so does the average kinetic energy of its molecules. As such, a rise in kinetic energy requires more space between the particles of a given substance, which leads to its physical expansion.

Conceptually, this makes sense when applying the VCF to observed volumes. Observed temperatures below the base temperature generate a factor above "1", indicating the corrected volume must increase to account for the contraction of the substance relative to the base temperature. The opposite is true for observed temperatures above the base temperature, generating factors below "1" to account for the expansion of the substance relative to the base temperature.

=== Exceptions ===
While the VCF is primarily used for liquid hydrocarbons, the theory and principles behind it apply to most liquids, with some exceptions. As a general principle, most liquid substances will contract in volume as temperature drops. However, certain substances, water for example, contain unique angular structures at the molecular level. As such, when these substances reach temperatures just above their freezing point, they begin to expand, since the angle of the bonds prevent the molecules from tightly fitting together, resulting in more empty space between the molecules in a solid state. Other substances which exhibit similar properties include silicon, bismuth, antimony and germanium.

While these are the exceptions to general principles of thermal expansion and contraction, they would seldom, if ever, be used in conjunction with VCF / CTL, as the correction factors are dependent upon specific constants, which are further dependent on liquid hydrocarbon classifications and densities.

== Formula and usage ==
The formula for Volume Correction Factor is commonly defined as:

$VCF =C_{TL}= \exp\{-\alpha_T\Delta T[1 + 0.8\alpha_T(\Delta T+\delta_T)]\}$

Where:

- $\exp$ refers to the mathematical constant, $e$, raised to the power of $\{-\alpha_T\Delta T[1 + 0.8\alpha_T(\Delta T+\delta_T)]\}$
- $\Delta T$ refers to the change in observed temperature ($t$) minus the base temperature ($T$) in degrees Fahrenheit $(t - T)$. When computing $VCF$, $T$ is commonly set to 60 °F.
- $\delta_T$ refers to a small base temperature correction value. If correcting to 60 °F, $\delta_T=0$
- $\alpha_{T}$ refers to the coefficient of thermal expansion at the base temperature. If a base temperature of 60 °F is used, $\alpha_{T}$ is written as $\alpha_{60}$,
  - and $\alpha_{60}=\frac{K_0}{\rho*^2}+\frac{K_1}{\rho*}+{K_2}$
  - $\rho^*$ refers to the density [Kg/M^{3}] at the base temperature, $T$, and 0 psig pressure. When correlated with $\alpha_{T}$ at 60 °F ($\alpha_{60}$) $\rightarrow$ $\rho^* = \rho_{60}$
  - $K_0$, $K_1$, and $K_2$ refer to a specific set of constants, dependent upon the liquid's classification and density at 60 °F
    - E.G. For Crude oils $K_0$, $K_1$, and $K_2$ = 341.0957, 0, and 0, respectively. See table below for typical values used.

Constants for different API products (API Chapter 11.1:2004)
| °API Range | Commodity | $K_0$ | $K_1$ | $K_2$ |
|---|---|---|---|---|
| -10.0 to 100.0 | Crude Oil e.g. Most Crude | 341.0957 | 0.00 | 0.00 |
| -10.0 to 37.1 | Refined Products: e.g. Fuel Oils | 103.8720 | 0.2701 | 0.00 |
| 37.1 to 48.0 | Refined Product e.g. Light Gas Oils | 330.3010 | 0.00 | 0.00 |
| 48.0 to 52.0 | Refined Products e.g. transition zone | 1489.0670 | 0.00 | -0.00186840 |
| 52.0 to 100.0 | Refined Products e.g. Very Light Gas Oils | 192.4571 | 0.2438 | 0.00 |
| -10.0 to 45 | Lubricating Oils e.g. Cylinder lube oil | 0.00 | 0.34878 | 0.00 |

=== Usage ===
In standard applications, computing the VCF or CTL requires the observed temperature of the product, and its API gravity at 60 °F. Once calculated, the corrected volume is the product of the VCF and the observed volume.

$V_{Corrected} = VCF * V_{Observed}$

Since API gravity is an inverse measure of a liquid's density relative to that of water, it can be calculated by first dividing the liquid's density by the density of water at a base temperature (usually 60 °F) to compute Specific Gravity (SG), then converting the Specific Gravity to Degrees API as follows: $SG = \frac{\rho_{Substance}}{\rho_{H2O_T}} \longrightarrow API_{Gravity}=\frac{141.5}{SG}-131.5$

Traditionally, VCF / CTL are found by matching the observed temperature and API gravity within standardized books and tables published by the American Petroleum Institute. These methods are often more time-consuming than entering the values into a VCF calculator; however, due to the variance in methodology and computation of constants, the tables published by the American Petroleum Institute are preferred when dealing with the purchase and sale of crude oil and residual fuels.

== Formulas for Reference ==
Density of pure water at 60 °F $=\ 999.016_{kg/m^3}$ or $0.999016_{g/cm^3}$

Note: There is no universal agreement on the exact density of pure water at various temperatures since each industry will often use a different standard. For example the, USGS says it is 0.99907 g/cm^{3}. While the relative variance between values may be low, it is best to use the agreed upon standard for the industry you are working in,
