= Valencia Football Club =

Valencia Football Club or Valencia Club de Fútbol may refer to:

- Valencia CF, a Spanish professional football club based in Valencia playing in La Liga
  - Valencia CF (youth), "Juvenil A", the under-19 team of Valencia CF
- Valencia Féminas CF, previously AD DSV Colegio Alemán, a Spanish women's football team from Valencia
- Huracán Valencia CF, a Spanish football team based in Torrent, Valencia
- Valencia FC (Haiti), a Haitian football club
- F.C. Municipal Valencia, a Honduran football club
- Club Valencia, a Maldivian football club
- Carabobo FC, a Venezuelan football team formerly known as Valencia FC
