= Gaumard Scientific =

American simulation company

- Type: Private company
- Industry: Medical Simulation
- Founded: 1946; 80 years ago
- Headquarters: Miami, Florida, U.S.
- Key people: Daphne Eggert, CEO
- Products: VICTORIA, NOELLE, HAL, SUSIE, Pediatric HAL, Newborn TORY, Super TORY
- Website: www.gaumard.com

Gaumard Scientific is a Miami, Florida-based company that creates simulators for major teaching hospitals and nursing schools, medical military training and emergency medical services. The company traces its history to 1946 and has over 400 employees.

== Background ==
A World War II trauma physician who explored the use of simulators for battlefield surgery founded Gaumard Scientific and developed the company's first product, which was a synthetic human skeleton used to replace the use of actual human skeletons in medical training programs.

The company manufactures simulators and training devices in the following categories:

- Birthing simulators
  - Examples: Victoria (birthing simulator), Noelle
- Robotic patient simulator HAL

== VICTORIA (birthing simulator) ==
VICTORIA, NOELLE S2200
- Inception: 2014
- Available: Currently available
- Current supplier: Gaumard Scientific
- Website: Victoria Product Page

The Noelle S2200 ("Victoria") is a full scale healthcare education simulator produced by Gaumard Scientific that simulates a mother in labor. The Noelle line of simulators including the Victoria model can reproduce events seen during a full-term or premature delivery. Delivery can be programmed to mimic many situations from a normal vaginal birth to a C-section. Complications including breech presentation, shoulder dystocia, maternal bleeding or umbilical cord prolapse can also be simulated. Healthcare personnel can thus hone their skills addressing serious situations that may not occur frequently before working with real patients. Victoria is tetherless and contains a rechargeable battery that can operate Victoria for about 8 hours as she is moved through a continuum of care. Additionally, actual medical equipment, such as a fetal monitor, a pulse oximeter and a blood pressure monitor can be used directly on Victoria.
