= Spanish ship Victoria =

Various Spanish Navy ships

Seven ships of the Spanish Navy have borne the name Victoria:

- Victoria, a 40-gun frigate of the early Bourbon period (1700–1750).
- Victoria, a 60-gun ship of the line captured in 1718 and scuttled in 1719.
- Victoria, a 40-gun frigate launched in 1729.
- Victoria, a 50-gun ship of the line launched in 1729 and wrecked in 1738.
- Victoria, a 24-gun frigate launched in 1753.
- Victoria, the name borne by the armoured frigate Vitoria during the reign of Amadeo I of Spain (30 December 1871–11 February 1873).
- Victoria (F82), a Santa Maria-class frigate commissioned in 1987.
