= Victoria Dam =

Victoria Dam may refer to:

- Victoria Dam (Cape Town)
- Victoria Dam (Sri Lanka), the largest hydroelectric dam in Sri Lanka
- Victoria Dam (Western Australia), a dam in Australia
