= Kawartha Lakes Road 35 =

Former Ontario provincial highway

Kawartha Lakes Municipal Road 35

Route information
- Maintained by city of Kawartha Lakes
- Length: 30.5 km (19.0 mi)

Major junctions
- South end: Road 8 (Glenarm Road)
- Road 48
- North end: Road 45 (Monck Road)

Location
- Country: Canada
- Province: Ontario
- Counties: Kawartha Lakes
- Villages: Glenarm, Victoria Road, Uphill

Highway system
- County roads in Ontario
← Road 34	Road 35	→ Road 36

Kawartha Lakes Road 35, also known as Victoria Road and Fennel Road, is a municipally maintained road located in the city of Kawartha Lakes, in the Canadian province of Ontario. The road is mostly straight, running in a north–south orientation throughout its length. It began at the hamlet of Glenarm and travels 30.5 kilometres (19.0 mi) to Uphill.

The road was constructed in the 1850s as the Victoria Colonization Road in an effort to settle the southern fringe of the Canadian Shield. The northern half was designated as Secondary Highway 505 until 1998, when it became part of Kawartha Lakes Road 35.

== Route description ==
Kawartha Lakes Road 35 is a straight road, and only deviates north of the Head River. The road runs in a predominantly north–south direction and covers a distance of 30.5 kilometres (19.0 mi). The road crosses primarily rural geography, with the exception of the three unincorporated communities: Glenarm, Victoria Road and Uphill.

The route begins in the hamlet of Glenarm at an intersection with Kawartha Lakes Road 8 (Glenarm Road) and runs between farms for most of its length; the occasional forest breaks the farmland. The road crosses the Trent-Severn Waterway and intersects Kawartha Lakes Road 48 (formerly Highway 48). The 18.7-kilometre (12 mi) road north of this point was known as Highway 505 until January 1, 1998, when it was downloaded to Victoria County and was numbered as County Road 35. This was changed to Kawartha Lakes Road 35 on January 1, 2001, when Victoria County became the city of Kawartha Lakes.

The road continues to the village of Victoria Road. North of this point, the road is on a lower maintenance priority, and pavement conditions quickly deteriorate. It continues until reaching the Digby–Laxton Boundary Road. The highway descends into the Head River valley, crosses the river and begins to wind through thick coniferous forest. As it rises out of the valley, now in the Canadian Shield, the route becomes very narrow and features several blind turns before ending in Uphill at Kawartha Lakes Road 45.

== History ==
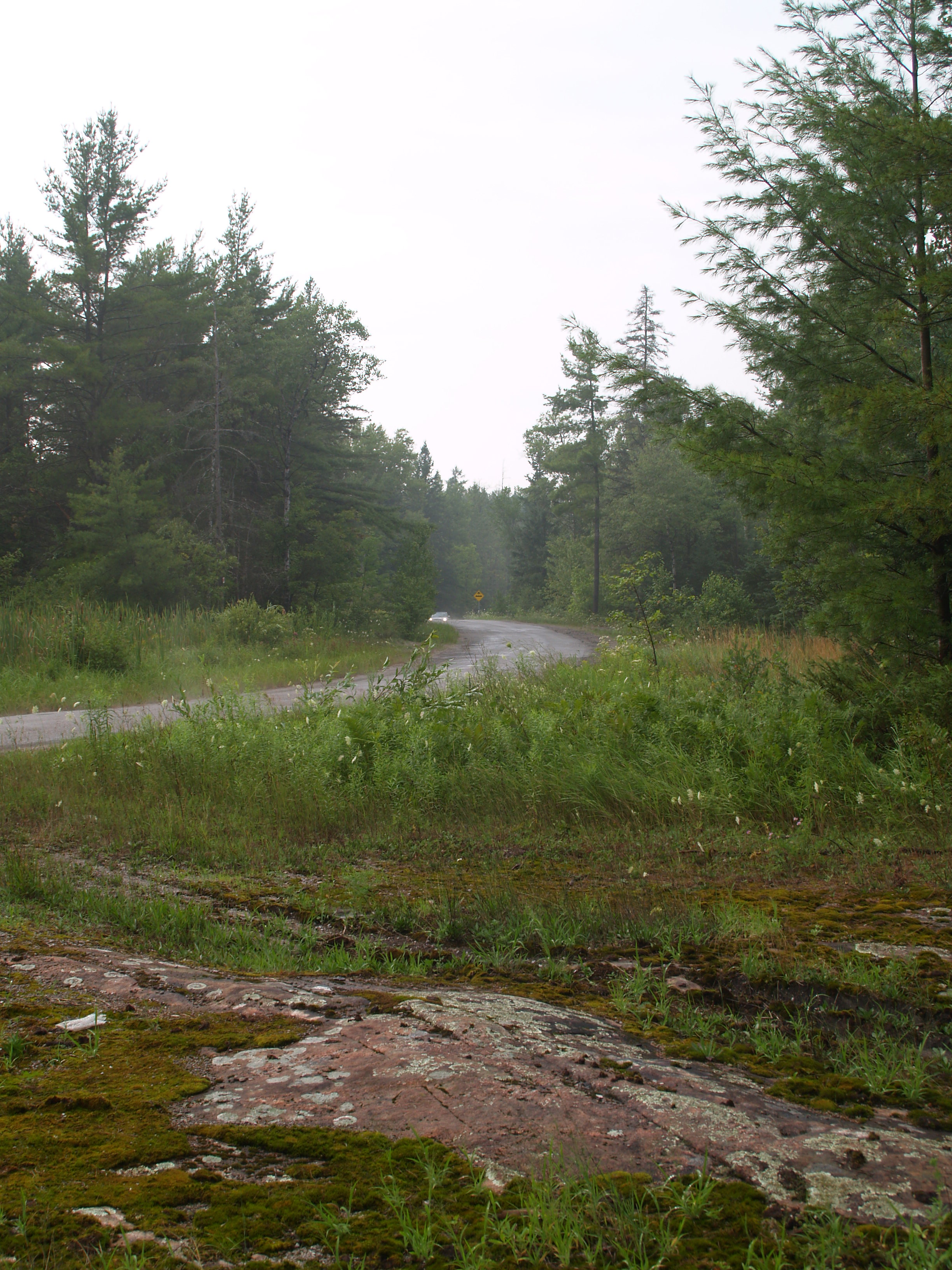
North of the Head River, Kawartha Lakes 35 enters the Canadian Shield.

During the early-1800s, the government of Upper Canada, a majority of which is now Ontario, appropriated settlers to various lots which had been surveyed along the lake shores of Lake Erie and Lake Ontario. The townships established along these fronts contained generally fertile land composed of glacial till and clay-rich loam. As these townships filled up, business opportunities presented themselves for investors to purchase native lands and open them to settlement. The Canada Company was the most successful of these ventures, and attracted settlers to vast areas of land in Western Ontario by building routes such as the Huron Road and the Toronto–Sydenham Road during the 1830s and 1840s. As these areas too filled, the government came under pressure to open up the unforgiving terrain of the Canadian Shield to settlement, and sought to establish a network of east–west and north–south roads between the Ottawa Valley and Georgian Bay. This area was known as the Ottawa–Huron Tract.

In 1847, an exploration survey was carried out by Robert Bell to lay out the lines that would become the Opeongo Road, Hastings Road and Addington Road. The Public Lands Act, passed in 1853, permitted the granting of land to settlers who were at least 18. Those settlers who cleared at least 12 acres (49,000 m^{2}) within four years, built a house within a year and resided on the grant for at least five years would receive the title to that land. The government subsequently built over 1,600 kilometres (1,000 mi) of roads over the following 20 years to provide access to these grants.

However, the promises of fertile land in this new northern tract of wilderness proved false. Beneath thin layers of sparsely spread soil was solid granite. Where this granite descended deeper, valleys formed and filled with muskeg. Despite an early influx of settlers, the vast majority of grants were abandoned by the turn of the century; only 40% remained. During the first half of the 1900s, many of these colonization roads were incorporated into the growing provincial highway network. Some sections were improved to modern highway standards, while others were subsequently bypassed or abandoned. The roads that were not incorporated as highways either became local roads or were consumed by nature.

The Victoria Road is one of several such colonization roads built in the 1850s to promote settlement in what was then the frontier of Ontario. The road continued north of its current terminus in Uphill into what is now the Queen Elizabeth II Wildlands Provincial Park. It then followed the Black River north-east to the Peterson Road in Vankoughnet; this part of the road fell into disuse by the turn of the century.

In 1956, the Department of Highways assumed a portion of the Victoria Road between what was then Highway 46 (Highway 48 between 1975 and 1998) and Highway 503 was designated as Secondary Highway 505. It retained this designation and remained unchanged until January 1, 1998, when the entire route was designated as Victoria County Road 35. Victoria County was restructured as the city Kawartha Lakes on January 1, 2001, which resulted in the road being renamed Kawartha Lakes Road 35.

== Major intersections ==
A map of Kawartha Lakes, with route 35 highlighted in orange (right-click on map to enlarge).

The following table lists the major junctions along Kawartha Lakes Road 35. The entire route is located in Kawartha Lakes.

Location	km	mi	Destinations	Notes
Glenarm	0.0	0.0		Road 8 (Glenarm Road)
	11.5	7.1	Road 48 (Portage Road)	Kawartha Lakes Road 35 is known as Victoria Road north of this junction, and as Fennel Road south of it.
Victoria Road	13.4	8.3	Blanchard's Road (east); Talbot River Road (west)	
Uphill	30.5	19.0	Road 45 (Monck Road)	Northern terminus of Kawartha Lakes Road 35; formerly Highway 503
1.000 mi = 1.609 km; 1.000 km = 0.621 mi

== See also ==
- List of numbered roads in Kawartha Lakes
