= Victoria United =

Victoria United may refer to:

- Victoria United (Canada), a Canadian soccer team
- Victoria United FC (Cameroon), a Cameroonian football club
- Victoria United F.C. (Scotland), a Scottish football team
