= Victoria Class =

Victoria class may refer to:

- Victoria-class submarine
- Victoria-class battleship
- GWR Victoria Class steam locomotive
