= Victoria (3D figure) =

Female articulated 3D figure

- Developer(s): Daz 3D
- Stable release: 8 / 15 June 2017; 8 years ago
- Operating system: Mac OS X, Windows
- Platform: Macintosh, Wintel
- Type: 3D computer graphics
- License: Proprietary (special)
- Website: https://www.daz3d.com

Victoria is an articulated 3D female figure developed and sold by Daz 3D. There have been several "generations" of the figure, all bearing the same name.

The figure was originally created as one of two standard characters which also included the male character "Michael" ("Stephanie" being a full body female morph of Michael).

Besides being poseable, using preset morph dials the figure can be manipulated into a variety of different aesthetic and ethnic female forms. The figure comes pre-rigged with standardized features, and earlier versions can be exported to a variety of 3D modeling/animation applications.

== History ==
Victoria 1 was released by then-Zygote in February 1999 and was the first named medium-resolution figure for use with Poser. She was originally released as 'The Millennium Woman', but the resulting colloquial shortening to "Millie" led to Zygote renaming her as Victoria. Zygote also sold an anime-morphed character for Victoria named Aiko, and each successive generation of Victoria has so far had an accompanying Aiko (whose facial morphs can vary between anime and a less exaggerated Asian).

Victoria 2 was the next step in the figure development, refining the rigging and coming with as a reduced polygon version. Released in 2001, V2 contained more body shaping features and a wider range of facial expressions but was rigged to be compatible with V1's clothing and accessories. From this point forward, the Stephanie character (following the Generation numbering) was no longer a remorphed Michael but a character based on (and requiring) Victoria. Victoria 2's eyebrows were separately transmapped objects.

Victoria 3, released in 2002 yet again raised the poly count and resculpted the face, leaving out transmapped eyebrows in favor of painting them directly onto the face texture, but was no longer backwards compatible to Victoria 2's rigging, textures or clothing. This generation was the first to have both the male and female figures be modeled from the same base "unimesh," allowing Victoria 3 and Michael 3 to easily share poses, texture maps and even morph targets. This was also the first figure for which neither Victoria nor Michael had genitals modeled on the body mesh; V3 provided a fine enough poly count in the region to make it possible for third party morphers to design their own while Michael 3's genitals were a parented prop (which continued with the next generation). This figure has an even higher density of polygons (74,510 polygons compare to 28,989 polys for V1 and V2) with improvement in rigging over the previous millennium figures. Victoria 3 was the first of Daz 3D figures to support morph injection poses, which allowed users to apply morphs from the Pose Library rather than manually selecting body parts and loading morph target files. Victoria 3's eyebrows were not transmapped but textures painted onto the face texture.

The fourth and final standalone generation of Victoria was released in late 2006, which included a new body shape and added several technical improvements to the figure. As with V3, V4's proportions and rigging were not designed to be backwards compatible. The mesh for Victoria 4.0 was developed using Luxology's modo. Sporting an almost mannequin-like appearance, Victoria 4's head nevertheless contains enough polys to make photorealistic, real-person likenesses possible.

Version 4.1 was released in April 2007 and included a separate rigged eyeBrow prop and improved on the capability to load multiple sets of morphs into the character without causing conflicts.

Version 4.2 was released in February 2008 which added a set of built-in male morphs and further technical improvements.

As Stephanie and Aiko had been characters for Victoria's base figure, Victoria 5 was released near the end of 2011 as a character for Daz Studio's Genesis Female rather than a standalone figure and was not initially compatible with Poser. Victoria 5 is rigged to support V4's texture maps and Daz Studio's cloth fitting allows her to wear Victoria 4's clothing, but due to having a different mesh she cannot use the same morph targets as Victoria 4. During the beta testing phases of Daz Studio 4, there was released information briefly regarding the preparation of Victoria 5 as a part of Genesis. As a Genesis figure, all clothing made for one Genesis-derived character auto-fits all others (a feature of Daz Studio). Finally, the mesh of Victoria 5 was updated and made smoother, with the use of SubD, weight maps and other Daz Studio native optimizations. Software like Poser can now load her using some plugins or Daz Studio .cr2 export, but Daz Studio-specific features will not be supported in Poser.

In June 2013, in sync with the release of the Genesis 2 figures, DAZ released Victoria 6 as a Genesis 2 character.

In June 2015, DAZ released Victoria 7 as a Genesis 3 character.

In June 2017, DAZ released Victoria 8 as a Genesis 8 character. If used with the Daz Studio "Autofit" tool, Victoria 8 can use add-on wardrobe resources created for Victoria 5, Victoria 6, and Victoria 7.
