= Voo =

Voo or VOO may refer to:

- VOO, a Belgian cable company
- Veronica Omroep Organisatie, the legal name of Veronica (media) during its phase as a public broadcaster
- Voo (crater), a crater on Mars
- VOO, an exchange-traded fund issued by the Vanguard Group which tracks the S&P 500
- Polish pronunciation of the letter W (usually written wu)

== See also ==
- Vo0 (Sander Kaasjager, born 1985), Dutch esports player
- Voo Voo, a Polish jazz-rock band formed in 1985
- Voo Nocturno, a 2007 album by Jorge Palma
- Voodoo (disambiguation)
