= Lake Victoria (Minnesota) =

Lake in the state of Minnesota, United States

- Location within Minnesota
- Location: Douglas County, Minnesota
- Coordinates: 45°52′55″N 95°19′57″W
- Type: lake

Lake Victoria is a lake in Douglas County, in the U.S. state of Minnesota.

Lake Victoria was named after Queen Victoria of the United Kingdom.

== See also ==
- List of lakes in Minnesota
