= Vlad Filat Cabinet =

Vlad Filat Cabinet may refer to:

- First Filat Cabinet, the first Cabinet of Moldova (2009-2011)
- Second Filat Cabinet, the second Cabinet of Moldova (2011-2013)
