= Victoria County =

Victoria County is the name of several locations:

In Australia:

- Victoria County, Western Australia
- County of Victoria, South Australia

In Canada:

- Victoria County, New Brunswick
- Municipality of the County of Victoria and the eponymous historical county and census division
- Victoria County, Ontario, amalgamated in 2001 to a single tier municipality named Kawartha Lakes

In Trinidad and Tobago:

- Victoria County, Trinidad and Tobago

in the United States:

- Victoria County, Texas
