= Victoria (surname) =

Victoria is a surname. Notable people with the surname include:

- Adia Victoria (born 1986), American singer and songwriter
- Ana Victoria (born 1983), American-born Mexican singer-songwriter, dancer and record producer
- Brian Victoria (born 1939), educator and author on Buddhism
- Eduardo Victoria (born 1970), Mexican actor
- Eladio Victoria (1864–1939), Dominican politician
- Francisco Victoria (1796–1830), Mexican independence fighter
- Guadalupe Victoria (1786–1843), first president of Mexico
- Gustavo Victoria (born 1980), Colombian football player
- Heidi Victoria (born 1967), Australian politician
- Manuel Victoria (died 1833), Mexican governor of Alta California in 1831
- Tomás Luis de Victoria (1548–1611), Spanish composer
