= Victoria Hospital =

Victoria Hospital or Queen Victoria Hospital may refer to:

== Australia ==
- Queen Victoria Hospital, Adelaide, a former hospital, now part of the Women's and Children's Hospital in Adelaide, South Australia
- Queen Victoria Hospital, Melbourne, Victoria
- Royal Perth Rehabilitation Hospital, originally called the Victoria Hospital, Subiaco, Western Australia

== Canada ==
- Victoria Hospital (London, Ontario)
- Victoria Hospital for Sick Children, Toronto, Ontario
- Victoria General Hospital (Victoria, British Columbia), Victoria, British Columbia
- Victoria General Hospital (Winnipeg), Manitoba

== South Africa ==
- Victoria Hospital (Alice), Alice, Eastern Cape
- Victoria Hospital (Cape Town), in Wynberg, a suburb of Cape Town, Western Cape

== United Kingdom ==
=== England ===
- Blackpool Victoria Hospital
- Queen Victoria Hospital, East Grinstead, West Sussex
- Queen Victoria Hospital, Morecambe, Lancashire
- Victoria Hospital, Richmond, North Yorkshire
- Victoria Hospital for Sick Children, Kingston upon Hull

=== Scotland ===
- New Victoria Hospital, Glasgow
- Victoria Hospital, Kirkcaldy
- Victoria Hospital, Rothesay

== Other countries ==
- Victoria Hospital, Hong Kong
- Victoria Hospital (Bangalore Medical College), Karnataka, India
- Victoria Hospital (Saint Lucia), Castries, Saint Lucia

== See also ==
- Augusta Victoria Hospital, Jerusalem, Israel
- Bahawal Victoria Hospital, Pakistan
- Royal Victoria Hospital (disambiguation)
- Victoria Eye Hospital, Hereford, a former hospital in Hereford, England
