= St. Nicholas Hotel (St. Louis) =

Former hotel in St. Louis, Missouri, United States

Coordinates: 38.629400°N 90.192113°W

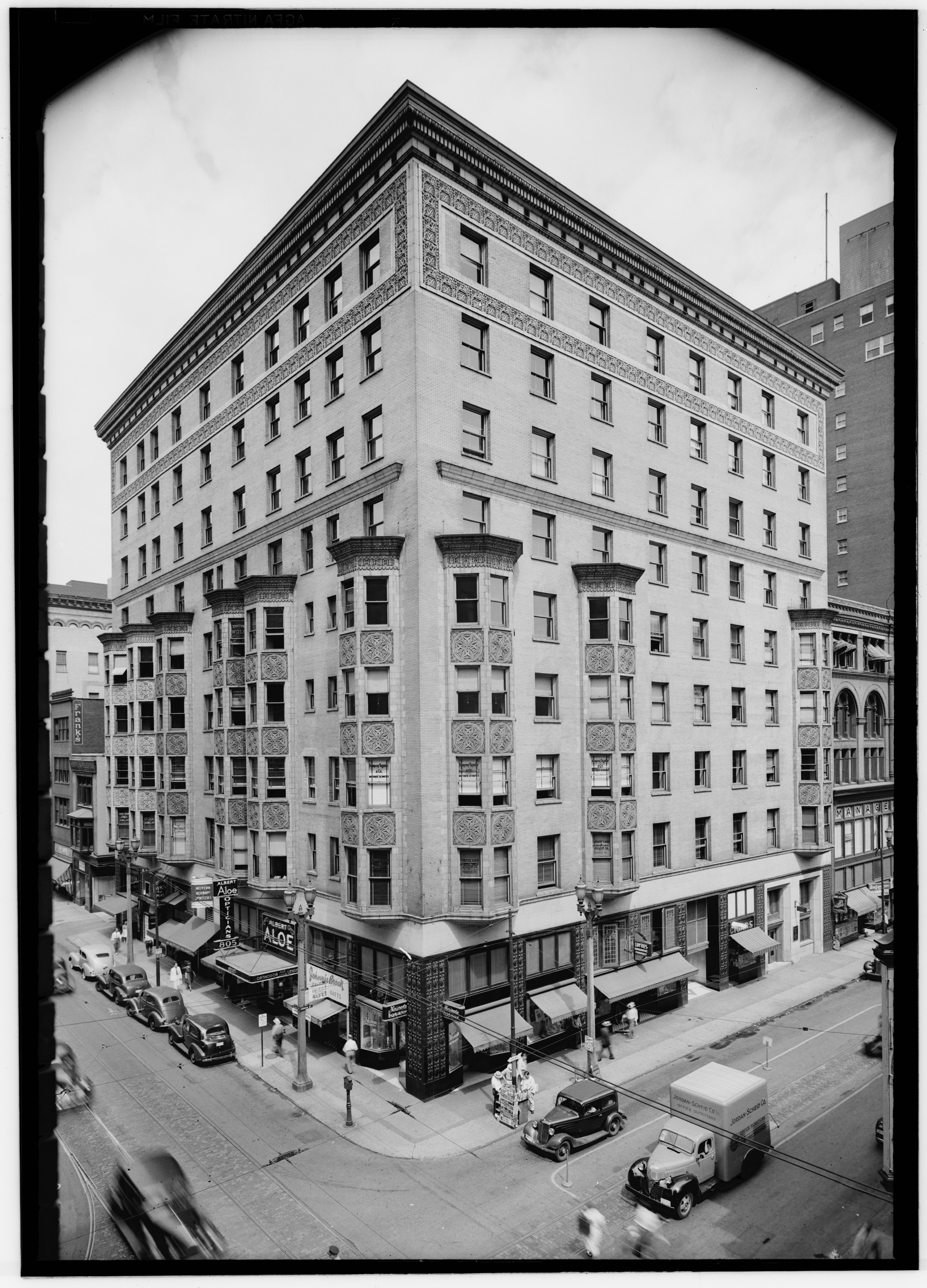
Victoria Building, formerly St. Nicholas Hotel, exterior view from southeast, 1940

The St. Nicholas Hotel was a historic hotel located at the northwest corner of 8th Street and Locust Streets in St. Louis, Missouri. After the hotel was closed in 1905, it was turned into an office building and renamed the Victoria Building. The original St. Nicholas Hotel in St. Louis was located on 4th Street, but this building was destroyed by a fire in 1884. The fire was not a hotel fire as the building was only occupied by stores at the time. This January 4, 1884, fire is remembered as one of the most difficult for the St. Louis Fire Department as the temperature had fallen to 26 degrees below zero with ice reaching two-feet thick to the outside walls after water had been sprayed on the exterior.

The second St. Nicholas Hotel in St. Louis was designed by the famous architect Louis Sullivan and was built in 1893. The eight-story hotel was opened a year later in 1894. Its exterior had distinctive terra-cotta snowflake embellishments.

The building was in the Historic American Buildings Survey, but it was demolished in 1973. A supposed fire had led to the hotel's conversion to an office building when the gabled roof and arched entrance were removed and four floors were added with a restaurant added and Victorian Turkish baths installed in the basement. The St. Nicholas Hotel was one of four structures in St. Louis by famed architect Louis Sullivan.
