= Royal Victoria Hospital =

Royal Victoria Hospital may refer to:

== General hospitals ==
=== Canada ===
- Royal Victoria Hospital, Barrie, Ontario, Canada (established 1891)
- Royal Victoria Hospital, Montreal, Quebec, Canada (established 1893)

=== United Kingdom ===
- Royal Victoria Hospital, Belfast, Northern Ireland (established 1873)
- Royal Victoria Hospital, Bournemouth, England (established 1889)
- Royal Victoria Hospital, Dover, England (established 1851)
- Royal Victoria Hospital, Dundee, Scotland (established 1899)
- Royal Victoria Hospital, Edinburgh, Scotland (established 1894)
- Royal Victoria Hospital, Folkestone, England (established 1846)
- Royal Victoria Infirmary, Newcastle upon Tyne, England (established 1751)

== Specialist hospitals ==
- Royal Victoria Eye and Ear Hospital, Bournemouth, England (established 1887)
- Royal Victoria Eye and Ear Hospital, Dublin, Ireland (established 1897)
- Royal Victoria Military Hospital, or Netley Hospital, Hampshire, England (established 1856)

== See also ==
- Royal Victorian Eye and Ear Hospital, East Melbourne, Victoria
- Victoria Hospital (disambiguation)
