= Royal Victoria Park =

Royal Victoria Park may refer to the following parks in England:

- Royal Victoria Park, Bath, Somerset
- Royal Victoria Park, Bristol, see Brentry Hospital
- Royal Victoria Country Park near Southampton, Hampshire
