= Victorian Football Club =

Victorian Football Club can refer to either of two defunct Australian rules football clubs:

- Victorian Football Club (South Australia), a defunct Australian rules football club based in Adelaide, South Australia
- Victorian Football Club (Western Australia), a defunct Australian rules football club based in Perth, Western Australia
