= The Victorians =

Television series

- Genre: Culture
- Developed by: BBC
- Written by: Jeremy Paxman
- Directed by: John Hay
- Presented by: Jeremy Paxman
- Composers: Chris Nicolaides; John Chilton; Peter Linlor
- Country of origin: United Kingdom
- Original language: English
- No. of series: 1
- No. of episodes: 4

Production
- Executive producer: Basil Comely
- Producer: John Hay
- Production location: United Kingdom
- Cinematography: Mike Garner
- Running time: 60 minutes
- Production company: BBC Television

Original release
- Network: BBC One; BBC HD
- Release: 15 February – 8 March 2009

The Victorians is a 2009 British documentary series which focuses on Victorian art and culture. The four-part series is written and presented by Jeremy Paxman and debuted on BBC One at 9:00pm on Sunday 15 February 2009.

== Episodes ==
Number	Title	Original airdate	Details
1	Painting the Town	15 February 2009	Jeremy Paxman investigates the most dramatic development of the Victorian age: cities
2	Home Sweet Home	22 February 2009	An exploration of the Victorian home
3	Having It All	1 March 2009	How railways, factories, and military might made Britain the richest country in the world.
4	Dreams and Nightmares	8 March 2009	How artists led a revolt against Victorian values of morality.

== Media ==
A book written by Paxman was published to accompany the series titled The Victorians: Britain Through the Paintings of the Age. In his introduction, Paxman acknowledged that the Irish writer Neil Hegarty had played a significant role in editing the book and bringing it to completion. Paxman was praised by academics and figures in the publishing industry for acknowledging Hegarty's substantial contribution. In the book, Paxman wrote that all television is a collaborative exercise, "so it is rather silly for this book - which accompanies a television series - to appear with only one name on the cover."

A region 2 DVD two disc set The Victorians was released 15 June 2009.
