= Victoria Island (California) =

Island in San Joaquin County, United States

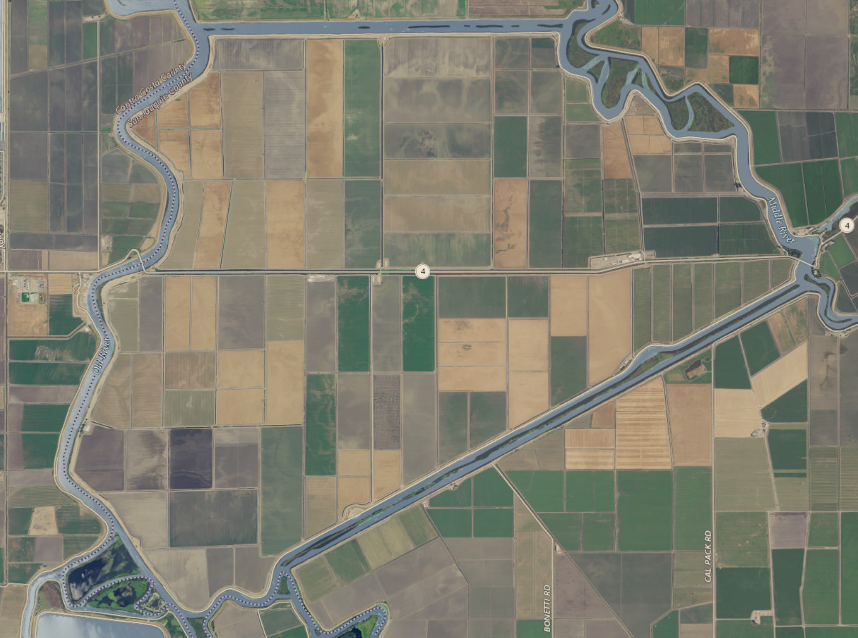
- USGS aerial imagery of Victoria Island

- Location within Sacramento-San Joaquin River Delta Location within California Location within the United States

Geography
- Location: Northern California
- Coordinates: 37.889925°N 121.534672°W
- Adjacent to: Sacramento-San Joaquin River Delta
- Area: 7,200 acres (2,900 ha)

Administration
- United States
- State: California
- County: San Joaquin

Victoria Island is an island in the Sacramento-San Joaquin River Delta, 20 km (12 mi) southwest of Stockton. The 7,200-acre (2,900 ha) island is bounded on the north by North Victoria Canal, on the northeast by Middle River, on the southeast by Victoria Canal, and on the south- and southwest Old River. It is crossed by California State Route 4. It is in San Joaquin County, and managed by Reclamation District 2040. It appears on 1913 and 1952 United States Geological Survey maps of the area.

== Buried impact structure ==
Oil exploration led to the discovery of a possible buried impact structure in the sediments under the island. It was named the Victoria Island Structure after the island.

== See also ==
- List of islands of California
