= Santa Vittoria =

Santa Vittoria may refer to:

- Santa Vittoria in Matenano, municipality in the Province of Fermo in the central Italian region Marche
- Santa Vittoria d'Alba, municipality in the Province of Cuneo in the Italian region Piedmont
- Battle of Santa Vittoria, battle in the Italian region of Emilia-Romagna on 26 July 1702 during the War of the Spanish Succession
- Nuragic sanctuary of Santa Vittoria, an archaeological site in Serri, Sardinia, Italy
- The Secret of Santa Vittoria, a 1969 film distributed by United Artists

== See also ==
- Vittoria (disambiguation)
- Saint Victoria (disambiguation)
- Santa Maria della Vittoria (disambiguation)
