= Saint Victoria =

Saint Victoria may refer to:

- Victoria, 1st-century martyr (see Saint Edistus)
- Victoria, Anatolia, and Audax (feast day: December 23)
- Victoria of Albitina (feast day: February 11)
- Saint Victoria (Spanish martyr), 4th-century martyr, sister of Saint Acisclus
- Victoria, 5th-century African martyr, martyred with Denise, Dativa, Leontia, Tertius, Emilianus, Boniface, Majoricus, and Servus

== See also ==
- Victoria (disambiguation)
- Santa Vittoria (disambiguation)
