= Santa Maria della Vittoria =

Santa Maria della Vittoria (St Mary of the Victory) is the name of several churches in Italy:

- The Basilica of Santa Maria della Vittoria, Rome
- Santa Maria della Vittoria, Mantua
- Santa Maria della Vittoria, Scurcola Marsicana
- Nuragic sanctuary of Santa Vittoria in Serri, Sardinia
- Santa Maria della Vittoria, San Vito dei Normanni, Apulia
- Santa Maria della Vittoria (Lucera Cathedral)
