= Porte Cailhau =

Historical monument in France

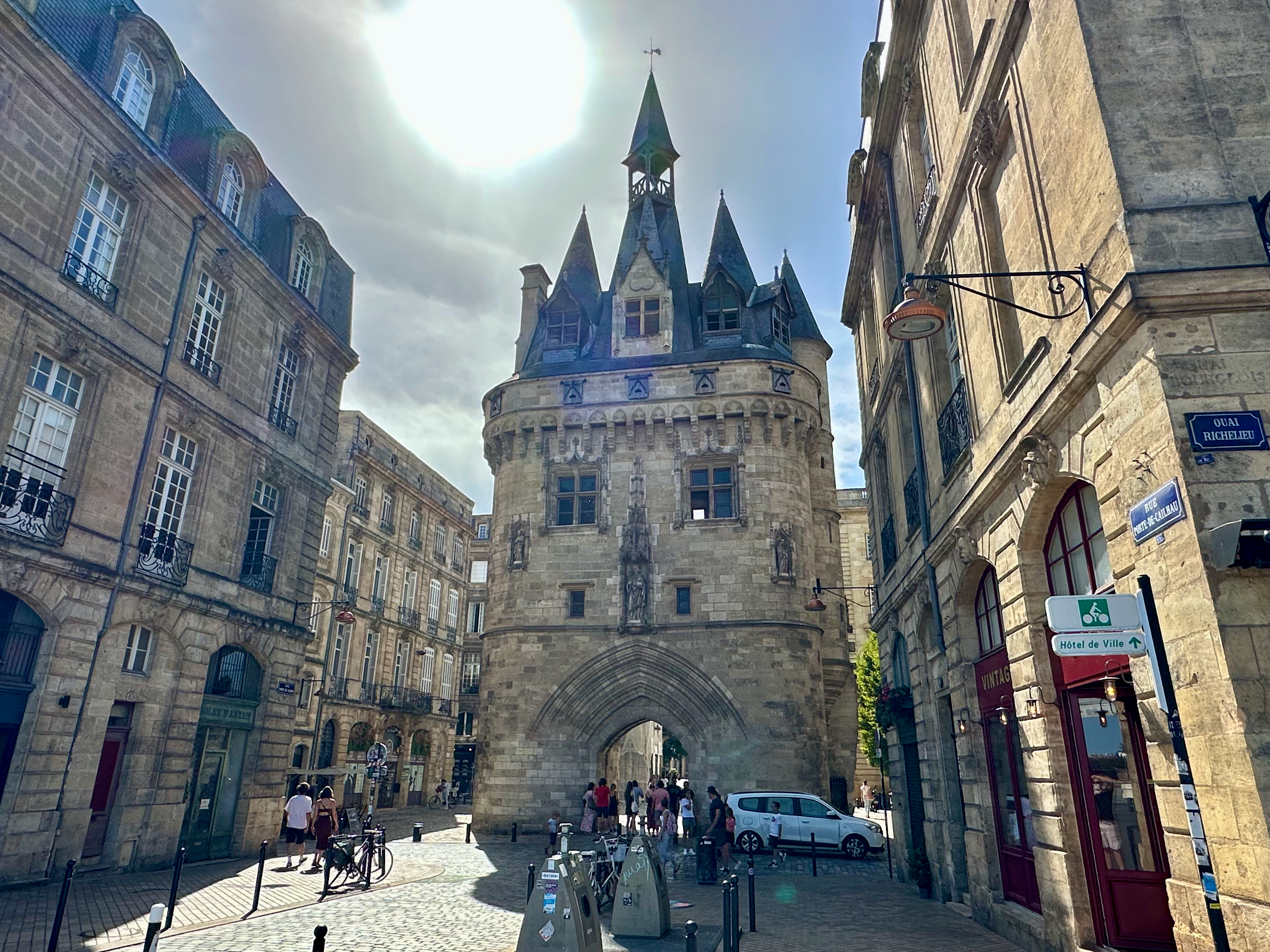
- Porte Cailhau seen from the Garonne side
- Interactive map of Porte Cailhau
- Location: Bordeaux, France
- Coordinates: 44°50′19.2″N 0°34′6.8″W
- Type: City gate
- Height: 35 m (115 ft)
- Beginning date: 1493
- Completion date: 1496
- Dedicated date: 1495
- Dedicated to: Charles VIII (Battle of Fornovo)

Porte Cailhau is a city gate and triumphal arch located in Bordeaux, France. The five pointed tower is a major fixture of the city's skyline.

== History ==
Porte Cailhau was built between 1493 and 1496. Originally part of the city walls (since destroyed), the remains of where the walls once joined the Porte (meaning "door" in French) can be seen at the rear of the monument.

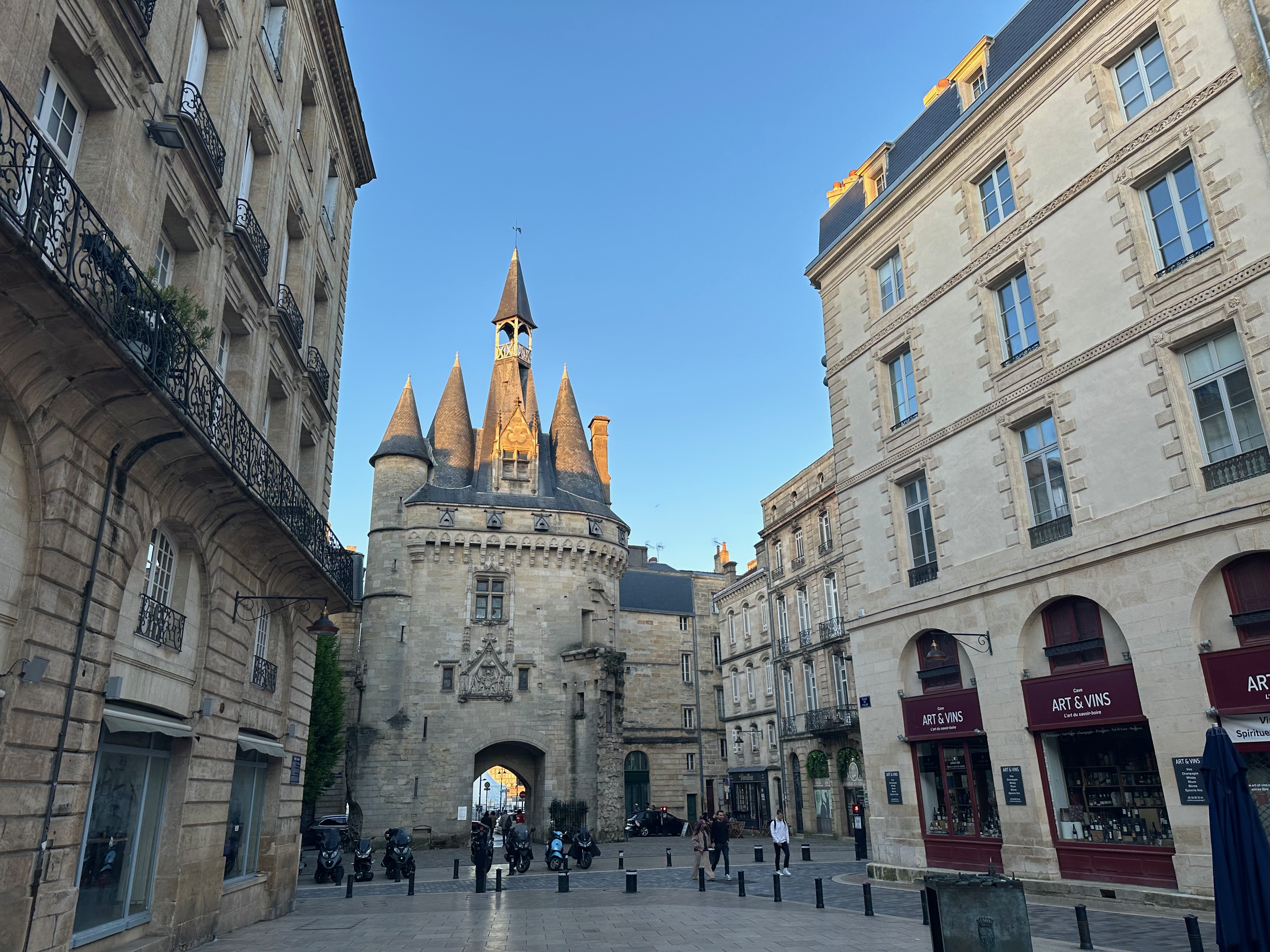
Porte Cailhau from Place du Palais. The remaining protrusion of the former walls can be seen on the right side of the tower.

A statue of the French King Charles VIII is visible on the front facade. The monument was partially dedicated to Charles' victory at the Battle of Fornovo in 1495.

The square behind Porte Cailhau, the Place du Palais, refers to the now destroyed Palais de l'ombrière palace of the Dukes of Aquitaine, the palais de l'ombrière. It was also the seat of the Parliament of Bordeaux before it was destroyed in 1791.

Porte Cailhau was designated as a monument historique (historical monument) by the French government in 1883. Today, it is owned by the city of Bordeaux.
