= Victoria of Albitina =

Algerian saint

Saint Victoria

Virgin Martyr
- Born: late 3rd c.
- Died: ~304 AD; Albitina, North Africa
- Venerated in: Roman Catholic Church; Eastern Orthodox Church; Oriental Orthodox Church; Anglican communion Lutheranism
- Major shrine: relics claimed by the Shrine of the Holy Relics, in Maria Stein, Ohio; also by Rignano, Italy
- Feast: 11 February

See Saint Victoria (disambiguation) for other saints with this name.

Saint Victoria (died 304 AD) is venerated as a martyr and saint by the Catholic Church. It states that she was of the North African nobility and refused an arranged marriage (a story told also of another Saint Victoria). On her wedding day, she leaped from a window in her parents' house. Arrested for her faith, Victoria argued with the judge at her trial, who was willing to release her. She was executed with forty-five other parishioners. Names from this group include Thelica, Ampelius, Emeritus, and Rogatian.

A priest named Saturninus was also killed with his children: Saturninus and Felix, readers, Mary, a virgin, and Hilarion, a young child.

Also executed were Dativus and another Felix, who were senators.
