= Madonna della Vittoria =

1496 painting by Andrea Mantegna

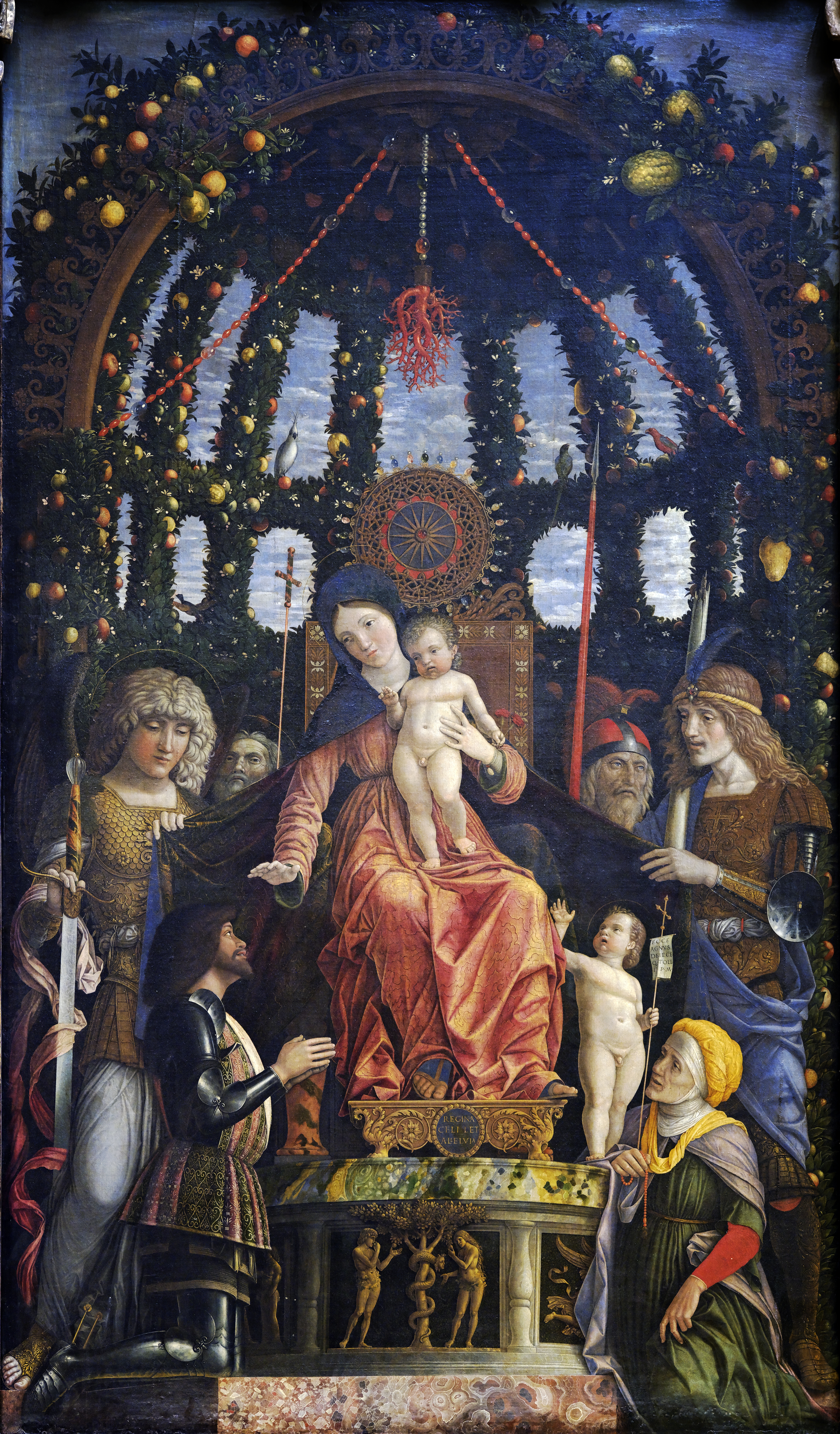
- Artist: Andrea Mantegna
- Year: 1496
- Medium: Tempera on canvas
- Dimensions: 280 cm × 166 cm (110 in × 65 in)
- Location: Louvre Museum, Paris

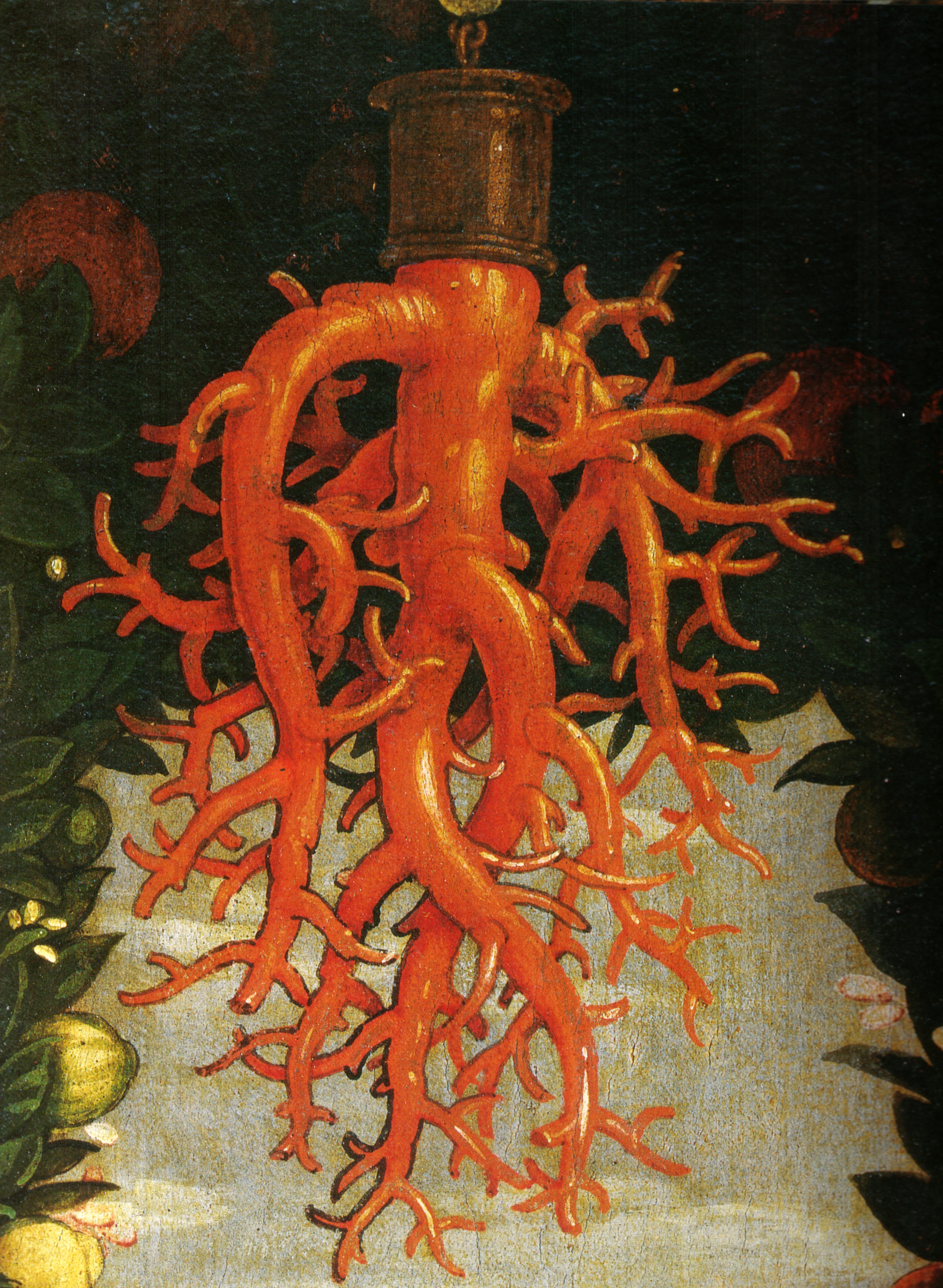
Detail of the coral

The Madonna della Vittoria is a painting by the Italian Renaissance painter Andrea Mantegna; the painting was executed in 1496.

== History ==
On 6 July 1495 the French army of Charles VIII of France, retreating from Italy after the French Invasion of 1494–1498, fought the Italic League at the Battle of Fornovo. The League, commanded by Francesco II Gonzaga, Marquess of Mantua, was made up of numerous nation-states determined to prevent French dominance in Italy, and included the Holy Roman Empire, Spain, Venice, Milan, and the Papal States controlled by Pope Alexander VI. In the battle, the League's army failed to capture Charles VIII, who retreated back to France, but captured the French treasure and supplies. Both the French and Italians claimed victory at Fornovo: (Note: If officially Italians celebrated the Battle of Fornovo as a victory – to the surprise of the French – privately, many were not so sure. Guicciardini's verdict was that ‘general consent awarded the palm to the French’) To celebrate the battle, Francesco commissioned Mantegna to paint the Madonna della Vittoria.

During Francesco's absence from Mantua, Daniele da Norsa, a Jewish banker, had purchased a house in the city's San Simone quarter and replaced the image of the Virgin Mary which decorated its façade with his own coat of arms. The regent, Sigismondo Gonzaga, ordered him to restore the depiction. Although Daniele agreed to do so, the populace, inflamed by antisemitic feeling, destroyed his house.

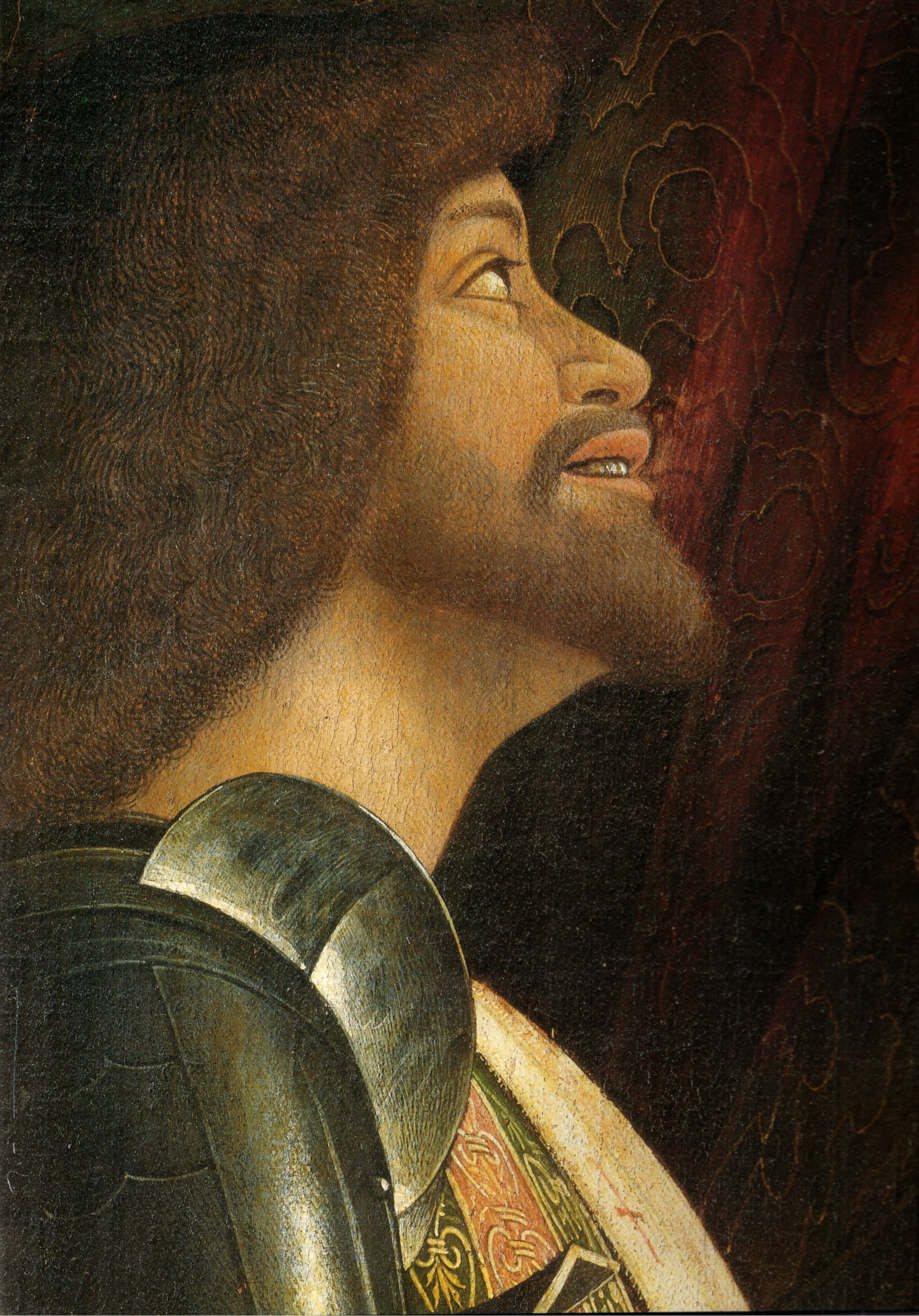
Detail of Francesco Gonzaga

When Francesco returned, he forced Daniele to fund a chapel and a devotional painting. The painting was to be executed by the Mantuan court painter, Mantegna, and was inaugurated in 1496 on the anniversary of the duke's victory at Fornovo. The work was placed in the church of Santa Maria della Vittoria, which had been constructed over the ruins of Daniele da Norsa's house.

The painting was one of the artworks brought to Italy by the French following the capitulation of Mantua during the Italian campaign of the Coalition Wars, and by 1798 it was being exhibited in the Louvre. The painting was never returned; the given excuse was that its large size made the transport difficult. The presence of a sulphur-crested cockatoo in the painting is considered as evidence of Arab trade in the Australasian region which dates all the way to when one such bird was gifted from Sultan al-Kamil to Frederick II in the 1240s.

== Description ==
The altarpiece shows Francesco Gonzaga paying homage to Mary, who sits on a high throne decorated with marbles intarsias and bas-reliefs. The base of the throne, with lion paws, has, within a medallion, the inscription "REGINA/CELI LET./ALLELVIA" (Queen of Heaven, rejoice, Alleluia); it lies on a circular basement with a bas-relief of the "Original Sin" and other stories from the Book of Genesis which are partly obscured by the praying figures. The throne's back has a large solar disc, decorated with weavings and vitreous pearls.

The child Jesus, who holds two red flowers (symbols of the Passion) and Mary look at Francesco Gonzaga, who is kneeling and has a grateful and smiling expression while receiving their blessing. The protection given to Gonzaga during the battle is also symbolized by Mary's mantle, which partially covers his head. Opposite to the donor are St. John the Baptist with a cross featuring the usual cartouche saying "ECCE/AGNVS/DEI ECCE/Q[VI] TOLL/IT P[ECCATA] M[VNDI]" (Behold the Lamb of God, which takes away the sins of the world), and his mother, St. Elizabeth, protector of Isabella d'Este, wife of Francesco Gonzaga. The choice of St. Elizabeth in the place of a patron may have been chosen as a message of judgement to the Norsa who were made to pay for the work as a penalty for removing an image of the Madonna from their home. Unlike the Norsa, St. Elizabeth who is represented as a Jewess in a yellow turban, was said to be the first to recognize the sanctity of Mary.

At the sides are two couples of standing saints: in the foreground are two military saints, the archangel St. Michael with a sword and St. Longinus with a broken spear, donning richly decorated armors; behind them are St. Andrew, patron saint of Mantua, with a long stick with the cross and St. George, another military saint, with a helmet and a long red lance.

The scene is set in an apse formed by a pergola of leaves, flowers and fruits, with several birds; the pergola's frame has at the top a shell (an attribute of the Virgin as new Venus), from which hang threads of coral pearls and rock crystal, as well as a large piece of red coral, another hint to the Passion of Jesus. The parrot is a comment on the birth of Jesus.

== Sources ==
- Ettore Camesasca [in Portuguese] (2007). "Mantegna". Pittori del Rinascimento. Florence: Scala. ISBN 978-88-8117-099-9.
- Kuiper, Kathleen, ed. (2009). The 100 Most Influential Painters & Sculptors of the Renaissance. Britannica Educational Publishing.
- Mallett, Michael; Shaw, Christine (2012). The Italian Wars 1494–1559. Modern Wars in Perspective. Harlow: Pearson. ISBN 978-0-582-05758-6.
- Santosuosso, Antonio (1994). "Anatomy of Defeat in Renaissance Italy: The Battle of Fornovo in 1495". The International History Review. 16, No. 2 (May) (2). Taylor & Francis, Ltd.: 221–250. doi:10.1080/07075332.1994.9640674.
