= Victoria of Córdoba =

Spanish saint

Saint Victoria
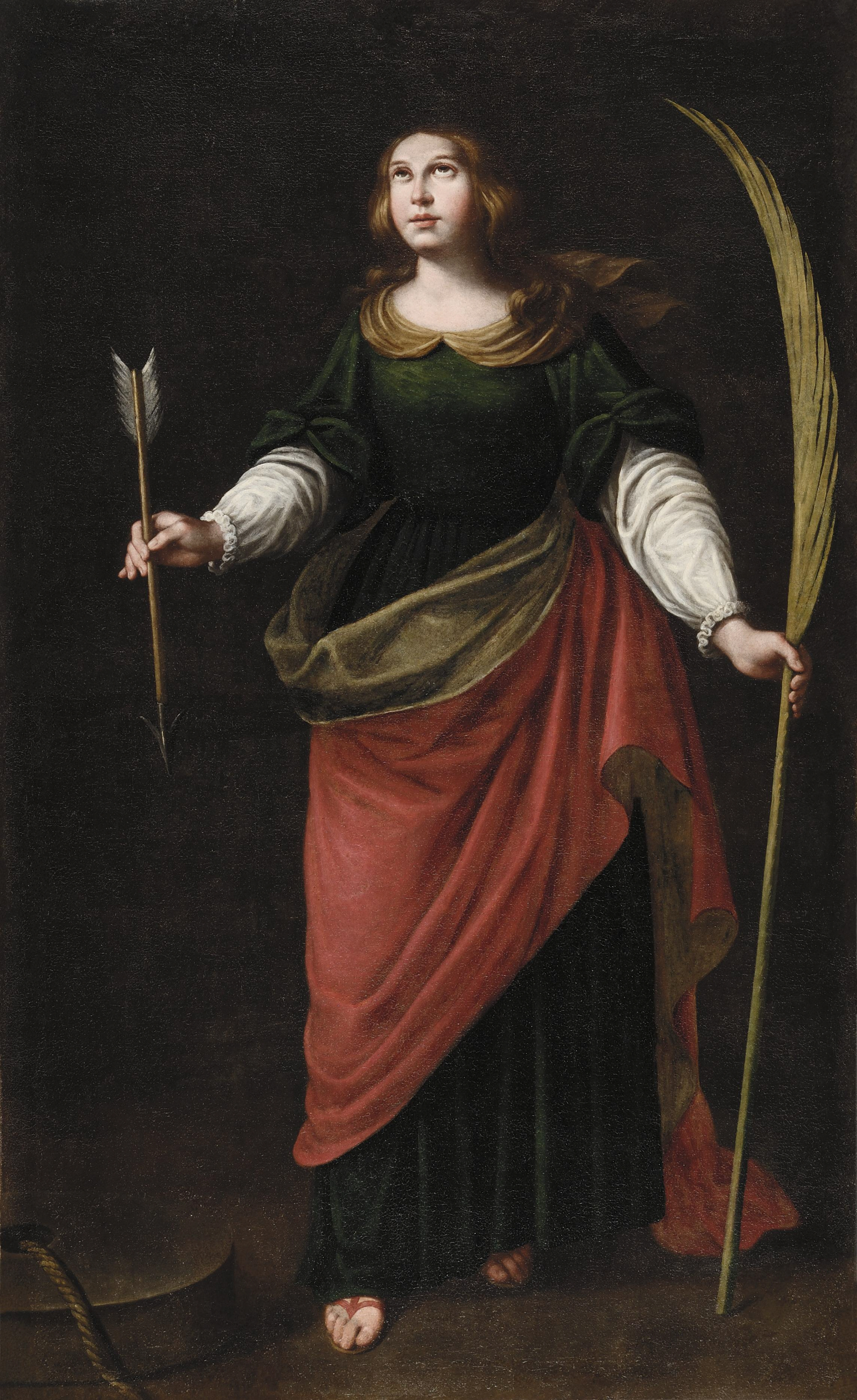
- Painting of Santa Victoria by José de Sarabia

Martyr
- Born: 3rd century Córdoba, Hispania Baetica, Roman Empire
- Died: 304; Córdoba, Hispania Baetica, Roman Empire
- Venerated in: Catholic Church; Eastern Orthodox Church
- Feast: 17 November
- Attributes: with Saint Acisclus, her brother, crowned with roses, arrow and palm branch
- Patronage: Córdoba, Spain

Saint Victoria was a martyr of Córdoba, in Hispania Baetica. She suffered martyrdom during the Diocletianic Persecution along with her brother Acisclus. They were mentioned by St. Eulogius. Victoria and Acisclus are considered the first saints of Cordoba, and are celebrated on 17 November (though their feast day was previously 27 June). There is doubt about the historical veracity of Victoria's existence, but both martyrs were honored in Mozarabic liturgical rites.

Ascisclus and Victoria were arrested for claiming that the Roman gods were "nothing but stones, no better than those who worshiped them." After they were arrested, Acisclus and Victoria were tortured.

One tenth century passio relates that the Roman prefect of Córdoba, Dion, an "iniquitous persecutor of Christians," had Acisclus and Victoria cast into a fiery furnace. However, when he heard Acisclus and Victoria sing songs of joy from within the furnace, Dion had them bound to stones and cast into the Guadalquivir. They were soon floating unharmed on the river's surface. He then suspended them over a fire. The fire, however, raged out of control and killed hundreds of pagans. Like St. Agatha, Victoria suffered the removal of her breasts. The two saints then submitted to martyrdom, having proved their point and demonstrated their faith. According to tradition, Victoria was killed by arrows and Acisclus was beheaded.

Their home was turned into a church. During the ninth century, some of the Martyrs of Córdoba were associated with this church, including Perfectus, a priest there.

== Veneration ==
Victoria and Acisclus are patron saints of Córdoba, and their cult was venerated throughout Spain and southern France, especially in Provence. There was a minor church dedicated to Saint Acisclus on the slopes of Montserrat. Acisclus and Victoria are represented in art as a young man and woman crowned with roses. St. Victoria is symbolized by an arrow and a palm branch.

According to Jesuit priest Martin de Roa (1559–1637), Victoria and Asisclus's blood sanctified the land in Córdoba creating the possibility of future miracles and prosperity.
