= Santa Maria della Vittoria, Mantua =

Church building in Mantua, Italy

Coordinates: 45.1602°N 10.7914°E

Church of Santa Maria della Vittoria
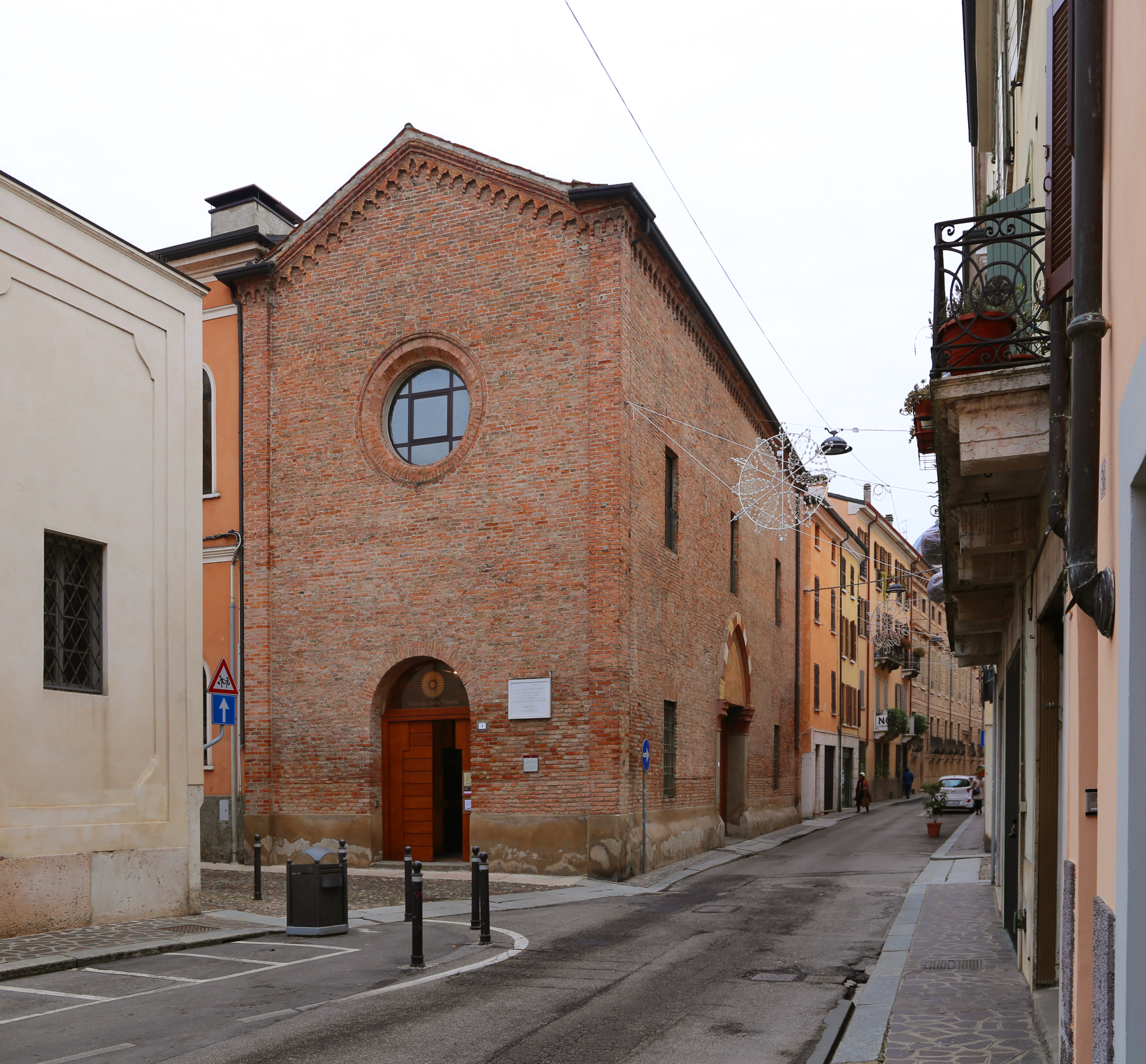

Religion
- Affiliation: Roman Catholic

Location
- Location: Mantua, Italy
- Interactive map of Church of Santa Maria della Vittoria

Architecture
- Type: Church
- Style: Gothic
- Groundbreaking: 1495
- Completed: 1496

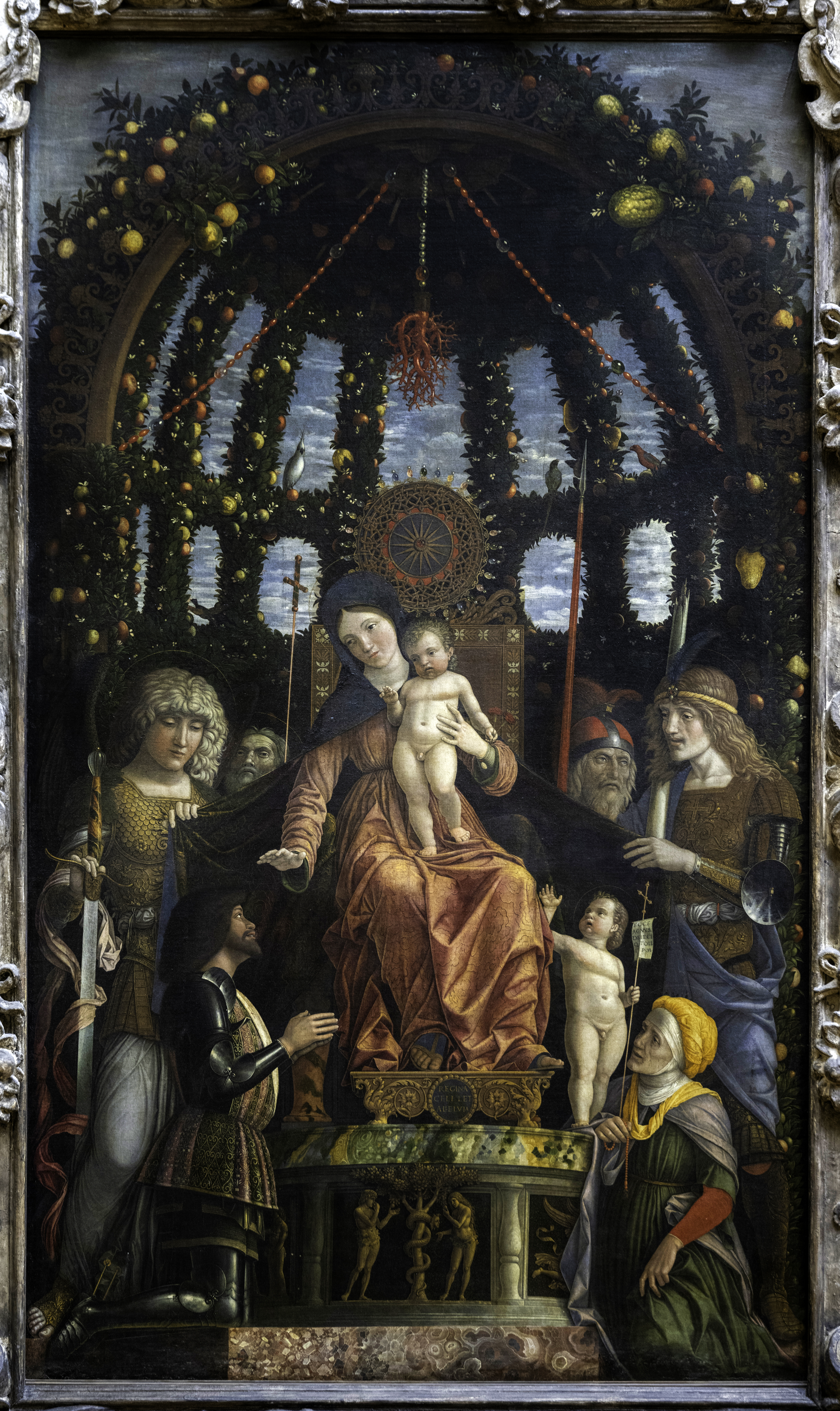
Madonna della vittoria, Andrea Mantegna, now at the Louvre

Santa Maria della Vittoria ("Saint Mary of Victory") is a medieval chapel or small church in Mantua located on Piazzetta di San Simone.

It was built by Marchese Francesco Gonzaga in 1496 in memory of his self-declared victory over the French army of Charles VIII in the battle of Fornovo. The site had previously been the house of a Jewish moneylender, Daniele da Norsa. Apparently he had overpainted a fresco representation of the Virgin on the façade with his own coat of arms. The ruler at the time, Sigismondo Gonzaga, demanded that the iconic painting be restored, or Daniele would face execution. Despite having accepted the unrefusable offer, a mob razed the house at the site. When Francesco returned, he pardoned the Jew, if he were to fund construction of the chapel . The architect Bernardino Ghisolfi designed the two story edifice. It once housed a famous altarpiece, the Madonna della Vittoria, painted by Mantegna; the painting was brought to France in 1797 and is now at the Louvre.

== Sources ==
- Bourne, Molly (2008). "Mantegna's Madonna della Vittoria and the Rewriting of Gonzaga History". In Nelson, Jonathan K.; Zeckhauser, Richard J. (eds.). The Patron's Payoff: Conspicuous Commissions in Italian Renaissance Art. Princeton University Press. ISBN 978-0-691-12541-1.
- Hickson, Sally Anne (2016). Women, Art and Architectural Patronage in Renaissance Mantua: Matrons, Mystics, and Monasteries. Routledge.
- Historic photographs of the church of Santa Maria della Vittoria
