= Protonuraghe =

Prehistoric stone structures found in Sardinia

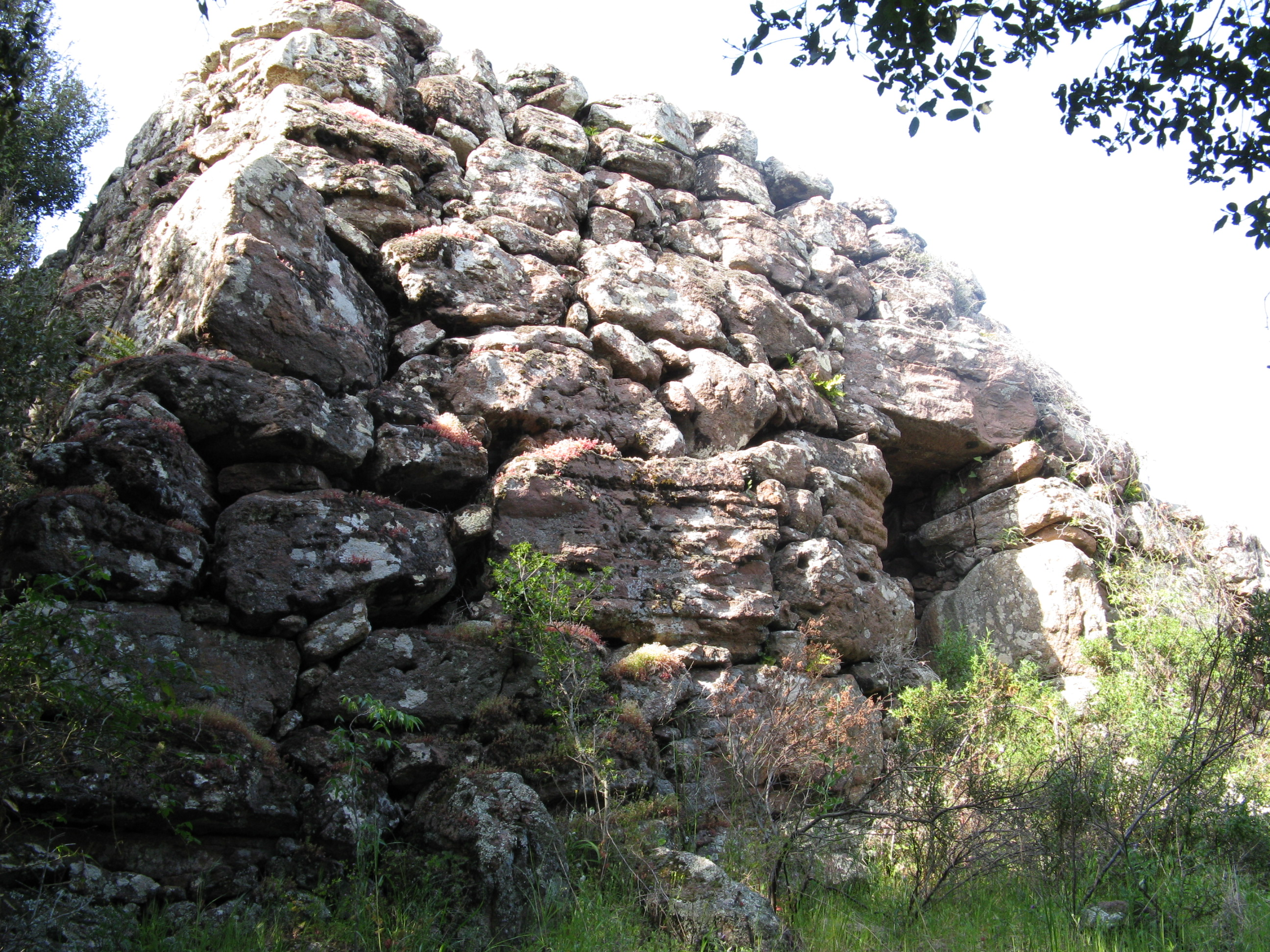
Protonuraghe Fronte 'e Mola of Thiesi, province of Sassari

A protonuraghe is a style of megalithic building dating from the first half of the 2nd millennium BC that precedes the classical nuraghe in Sardinia. Of the approximately 7,000 nuraghes, only 300 belong to this type.

== Description ==
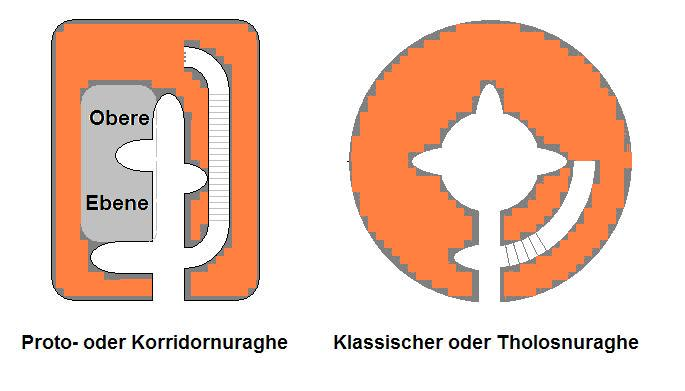
Plan of a protonuraghe (left) and a classic nuraghe (right)

Also called "pseudonuraghes" or "corridor nuraghes", the protonuraghes were built between 1700 and 1500 BC, during the transition period between the Bonnanaro culture (A2 phase, Sant'Iroxi ) and the Sub-Bonnannaro culture (facies of Sa turricula). They differ significantly from the classical nuraghes for their stockier look and their generally irregular plan and because they are not provided with the large circular room, typical of the classical nuraghes, but one or more corridors, or in any case smaller environments.

The height usually does not exceed 10 m, although the area occupied by these buildings was significantly higher in average than that occupied in general by the nuraghes.

The more functional environment of these buildings was the terrace that probably housed the huts that served as living environments.

Little known until a few years ago, they have been the focus of studies and disputes among scholars who have begun to consider them fundamental for understanding the birth of the Nuragic culture. The name itself is not yet unanimous: the term "corridor nuraghe" is disputed by Giovanni Ugas, who would prefer to use only the term "proto" with temporal connotation, according to the earlier construction of this type of nuraghe.

== Bibliography ==
- Paolo Melis, Civiltà nuragica, Carlo Delfino editore, Sassari, 2003, ISBN 88-7138-276-5.
