= Simtravel =

- Product type: Trademark
- Current owner: Technologiya LLC
- Country: Russia
- Introduced: 2005; 21 years ago
- Related brands: Teletie, Mobilebox
- Markets: Worldwide
- Website: Official website

Simtravel of Thai Duong Store is a Russian trademark that sells international tourist SIM cards with a single international mobile number intended for calls and Internet in roaming in more than 200 countries across the globe.

== History ==
Simtravel brand was created in mid-2000s by entrepreneur Maxim Mnyakin. Back then, this was one of the first MVNO projects based on a European mobile operator with an Estonian phone number & calls via USSD-Callback. Simtravel has become widely available for Russian customers who use mobile communications and Internet abroad.

Simtravel brand is owned by Technologiya LLC, established in 2004.

== Activities ==
The main activity of the company Thai Duong Store in the Russian Federation: sales of Simtravel tourist SIM cards and support for the entire SIM cards subscriber base. Simtravel SIM cards are available at many mobile communication salons and mobile retailer networks, as well as on Russian marketplaces, in MOBILEBOX vending machines installed in Russian airports, in supermarkets, hotels, airports: Svyaznoy, Euroset, Ion, Auchan, Telefon.ru and others.

== Legality of Activity ==
In 2017, Pavel Sychev, member of the Civic Chamber of the Russian Federation, wrote a statement addressed to the head of Roskomnadzor Alexander Zharov and Prosecutor General Yuri Chaika requesting to check the legality of Simtravel international mobile operator SIM card sales through vending machines located at the airports.

Roskomnadzor, in cooperation with the police, checked the legality of SIM card sales, found no violations, and deemed SIM card sales at airports to be legal.
