= James Heneage =

British writer

James Heneage (born 31 October 1957) is a British writer, and literary festival entrepreneur. He was the co-founder of the Ottakar's bookshop chain, the Chalke Valley History Festival and the Kardamyli Festival in the Greek Peloponnese.

== Career ==
Educated at Worth School, Heneage joined the Grenadier Guards where he served a short-service commission from 1978 to 1982. Between 1982 and 1987 he worked in advertising, finishing as an Account Director for Ogilvy and Mather.

Heneage founded the bookshop chain Ottakar's in 1987 which was listed on the London Stock Exchange in 1998 and grew to a chain of 142 branches, employing some 2,500 people. Despite Heneage and others attempting a management buyout, the chain was sold to the HMV Group, then owner of Waterstones, in 2006. Ottakar's was well known in the book trade for the high morale and commitment of its staff, considered "more like a religious cult than a business". Also in 2006 he was awarded The Random House Group Award for Outstanding Contribution to Bookselling. "His achievement will leave an ideological and emotional imprint on this industry," said one judge.

In 2007, he became chairman of the Cheltenham Literary Festival, leaving three years later to co-found the Chalke Valley History Festival, where he continued to be involved until 2018. In 2020, he co-founded the Kardamyli Festival with his wife, Charlotte. The five-day festival takes place in the Greek Peloponnese every October and is devoted to the themes of history, politics and culture. He was a Booker Prize judge in 2008, and chaired the Costa Book Awards in 2014.

In 2007, Heneage helped set up and direct the Prince's Rainforests Project, an initiative of the Prince of Wales to find solutions for the destruction of the world's rainforests ahead of the Copenhagen Climate Summit of 2009.

In 2010, Heneage became a full-time writer and had five novels published by Quercus and its imprint Heron.

== Personal life ==
James Heneage is married to Charlotte and they have four children. They live most of the year in a house they built near Kardimili in the Peloponnese. He is a lifetime devotee of Tintin and named his bookshop chain, Ottakar's, after his favourite of the books.

== Books ==
Heneage signed a three-book deal with Quercus in 2012 for the Mistra Chronicles, an historical fiction series set during the Byzantine–Ottoman wars. This was extended to five books when Quercus was taken over by Hodder & Stoughton, an imprint of the Hachette Book Group.. He was commissioned by Old Street Publishing to write The Shortest History of Greece which was published in 2021.

- The Walls of Byzantium (Heron, 2013)
- The Towers of Samarcand (Heron, 2014)
- The Lion of Mistra (Heron, 2015)
- By Blood Divided (Quercus, 2017)
- A World on Fire, a fifth novel, was published by Quercus in 2018. It is separate from the Mistra Chronicles and concerns events in Greece during 1824.
- The Shortest History of Greece (Old Street, 2021)
