= Timur Artemev =

Russian entrepreneur

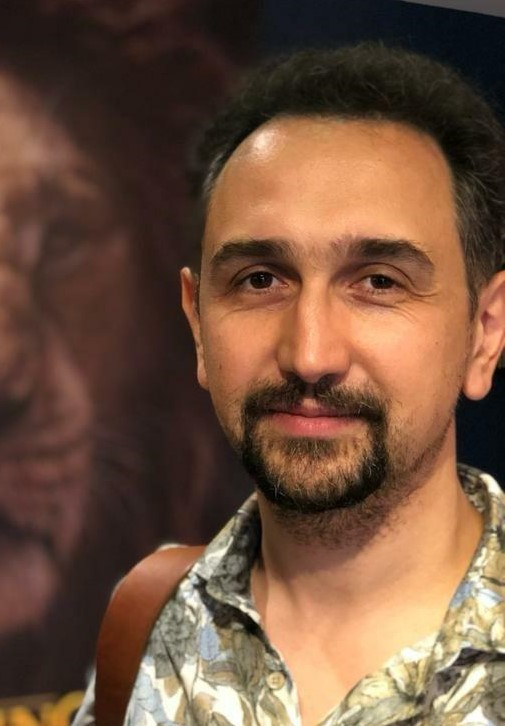
- Born: July 19, 1974 (age 52); Moscow, Soviet Union (now Russia)
- Occupation: Entrepreneur
- Years active: 1997–present
- Known for: Co-founder of Euroset, investments in biotechnology and longevity research
- Board member of: Retrotope, MDSec INC
- Spouse: Ksenia Shuravko
- Children: 6

Timur Vladimirovich Artemev (Russian: Тиму́р Влади́мирович Арте́мьев; born July 19, 1974) is an international investor and entrepreneur, philanthropist, and public figure, co-founder of the biggest Russian mobile phone retailer Euroset.

He has been living in the UK since 2009, and is engaged in investment and public activities.

== Biography ==
He was born on July 19, 1974, in Moscow. His father is a teacher of the theoretical basics of electrical engineering, and his mother is a planning engineer. He graduated from secondary school No. 119 in Moscow.

Since his childhood, he was keen on electronics and sophisticated technology. In his final grade, he was engaged in assembling phones with automatic caller's number identification.

In 1991, he entered the Russian Technological University's (MIREA) Department of Robotics. After studying in the first semester, Artemev decided to quit from the university and entered the Moscow Independent University of Environmental and Political Sciences (MNEPU), which he also decided to quit from six months later. Artemev realized that he was not satisfied with the proposed educational system and methods. He left his studies, and preferred to pursue higher education independently, focusing on the most interesting topics. However, in 2003, he graduated from the Law Faculty of the Moscow External University of the Humanities (MEGU). In 2004, he entered the Russian State University for the Humanities' (RSUH) Faculty of World Economics. At that time, Artemev was already a director of Euroset, and the management of the company did not allow him to study at full capacity. He was forced to stop studying a year after he entered.

== Career ==
He started his activity in the field of selling telecommunication equipment in 1991. In 1995, he worked for some time in the company "Astrum", which deals with the sale of mobile phones of NMT 450 standard. In March 1996, together with Alexey Beloglazov, he founded Medicom, a company selling mobile phones. The company's first store opened in May 1996 in Maly Zlatoustinsky lane in Moscow. In the autumn of the same year, it withdrew from the partnership.

In 2003, Artemev created Telefon Gazeta, an electronic platform for placing announcements about the sale of anything among individuals. The project allowed many people to find a decent job for free. Later, the platform changed its owners and name to "Job Parade".

In 2003, he ran for the State Duma in the 108th Lubertsy single-seat constituency. Artemev received 22% of the votes in the elections. However, the mandate of the deputy was given to Viktor Semyonov, a member of the "Edinaya Russia" party.

Since 2005, he has been fond of issues related to active longevity. He decided to work actively on his health and live until the 22nd century. This personal attitude was reflected at the beginning of Artemev's funding for research work related to the study of aging and longevity. In 2005, he founded the Institute of Aging Biology. Artemev began funding the institute, and is currently still a trustee of the biological laboratory of Evgeny Nudler, Professor at the Department of Biochemistry and Molecular Pharmacology at New York University Medical School. The laboratory is engaged in basic research and focuses on research on aging in living organisms, RNA sensor research, gene regulation and stress response. Over the years, the laboratory has made world-class discoveries manifested in international scientific publications such as Nature, Science, Cell.

In total, by the mid-2010s, he has invested more than $5 million in scientific research and development of institutes in this field.

In the UK, Artemev focuses on new high-tech projects and startups and makes point investments in innovative projects. He continues to be actively involved in the development of projects related to active longevity.

In 2014, he acquired technology for the production of an electronic self-balancing unicycle, a portable individual vehicle. In 2015, he established Uniwheel, a company for the production and distribution of self-balancing unicycles.

In 2016, he became a member of the board of directors of the American diagnostics company MDSec INC, as well as a board member of the American pharmaceutical company Retrotope, specializing in biotechnology.

Artemev is interested in projects related to space technology and mining programs on the moon. In 2016, he became a partner in Moon Shot, a company specializing in investments in the space industry.

=== Euroset ===
On April 2, 1997, together with his childhood friend Evgeny Chichvarkin, he founded the Euroset Trading House, which sells mobile phones and other communication equipment. Timur and Evgeny knew each other and were friends since the age of four. The company's first store with a range of only a few mobile phones was opened in 1997 in Georgievsky lane in Moscow. The second point of sale appeared three weeks later in the "Electronics" store at 99 Leninsky Prospekt.

In the management of Euroset, Artemev and Chichvarkin shared their responsibilities as follows: Evgeny was responsible for commercial activities, marketing, and promotion, while Timur was responsible for financial and accounting management, as well as for introducing new technologies into operations. This division allowed partners to complement rather than interfere with each other, creating one of the strongest business duos in Russia in the 2000s.

In 2006, the Euroset company reached the peak of the growth and development of its distribution network. Timur Artemev and Evgeny Chichvarkin concluded that they were ready to sell the company and engage in other projects. In 2008, Euroset's founders received an offer to purchase the company. On September 22, 2008, Artemev and Chichvarkin signed an agreement on the sale of 100% of Euroset to Russian businessman Alexander Mamut. The deal was closed in October. In December, Artemev, on the advice of his friend and partner Evgeny Chichvarkin, who had urgently moved to the UK, decided not to return to Moscow and went straight to London during a holiday in Prague.

== Personal life ==
Artemev was married several times and raises six children. Currently, he is in a partnership with Ksenia Shuravko, co-owner of the largest Belarusian resource Onliner.by. In 2019, the couple bore a son.

In the United Kingdom, Artemev first lived in London, then bought an old nineteenth-century mansion in Surrey, southwest of the British capital, where he moved and still lives in today.
