= Daunt Books =

British bookstore chain

Coordinates: 51.52048°N 0.15190°W

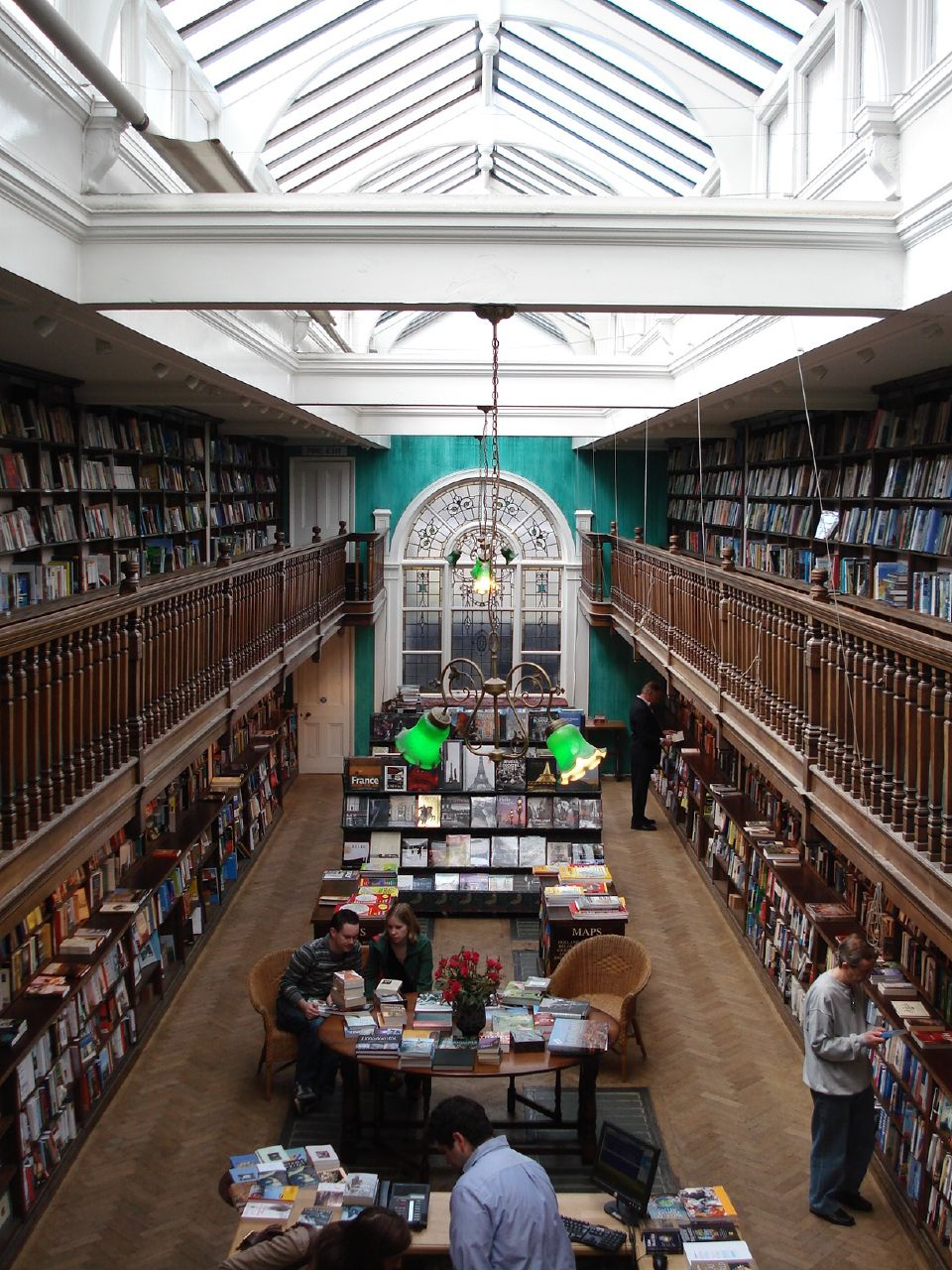
- Interior of Daunt Books' Marylebone High Street branch
- Company type: Privately held company
- Industry: Retail; Bookshop
- Founded: 1990
- Founder: James Daunt
- Headquarters: London, England, UK
- Number of locations: 10 stores (2025)
- Area served: United Kingdom
- Products: Books; Stationery; Calendars; Gifts & Bags
- Website: www.dauntbooks.co.uk

Daunt Books is an independent chain of bookshops in England, founded in 1990 by James Daunt. It originally specialised in travel books. In 2010, it began publishing. James Daunt later became the managing director of Waterstones and the US bookstore chain Barnes & Noble.

== Bookshops ==
Daunt Books was founded in 1990 by former banker James Daunt with the purchase of a bookshop on Marylebone High Street. It now focuses on first-hand titles (especially travel-related material). The Marylebone branch is housed in a former Edwardian bookshop with long oak galleries, graceful skylights and William Morris prints. The older section of the Marylebone shop was completed in 1912, and was originally an antiquarian bookshop called Francis Edwards. It is claimed to be the first custom-built bookshop in the world. A large, walk-in safe is visible near the entrance to the travel gallery, and is where expensive volumes were once stored.

The company has branches in Holland Park, Cheapside, Hampstead and Belsize Park. The Owl Bookshop in Kentish Town was bought by Daunt Books, but retains its original name. Daunt Books opened its first branch outside London in Saffron Walden, Essex, under the name Hart's Books. It opened its second branch outside London in Marlow, Buckinghamshire, under the name The Marlow Bookshop, followed by a branch in Summertown, Oxford.

Specialising in travel, Daunt Books arranges its sections geographically, with guides, phrasebooks, travel writing, history and fiction grouped by their relevant country. Reviews have mentioned its customer service and knowledgeable staff.

Each branch organises talks by authors, with discussions. Daunt also hosts the Daunt Books Festival held annually in the spring.

== Publishing ==
In 2010, Daunt Books launched a publishing venture with Saki's Improper Stories, and has since republished many other out-of-print and new books. It publishes literary fiction and non-fiction, including both forgotten titles and new works.

== Tote bags ==
Daunt Books introduced a canvas tote bag around 2006, as a giveaway carrier for customers spending over £50. After customers attempted to put the bags over their shoulders, Daunt changed to a larger, long-handled version in heavier fabric, which they made available for purchase. The bags became very popular. They remain free with bulky purchases and those exceeding £80 and are now available in several colours. They are decorated with a line drawing of the Marylebone shopfront and are made in India by Re-wrap, a social enterprise which trains women to manufacture organic cotton items for export.

== See also ==
- Books in the United Kingdom
