= Ottakar's =

British book retailer

Ottakar's plc
- Industry: Retail bookshop
- Founded: 1987
- Founder: James Heneage
- Defunct: Late 2006
- Fate: Sold off
- Successor: Waterstone's
- Headquarters: St John's House, London
- Number of locations: 141 (2006)
- Area served: UK
- Key people: Philip Dunne; James Heneage; Michael Hitchcock; David Adams; Mark Fane; John Thornton
- Products: Books
- Revenue: £176 million (2006)
- Operating income: -£3.2 million (2006)
- Total assets: £18.4 million (2006)
- Owner: Waterstones (trademarks)
- Number of employees: 2,243 (2006)
- Subsidiaries: Town Booksellers Limited

Ottakar's was a chain of bookshops in the United Kingdom founded in 1987 by James Heneage. Following a takeover by the HMV Group in 2006, the chain was merged into the Waterstone's brand, who retain the Ottakar's trademark after Waterstones and HMV split.

== History ==
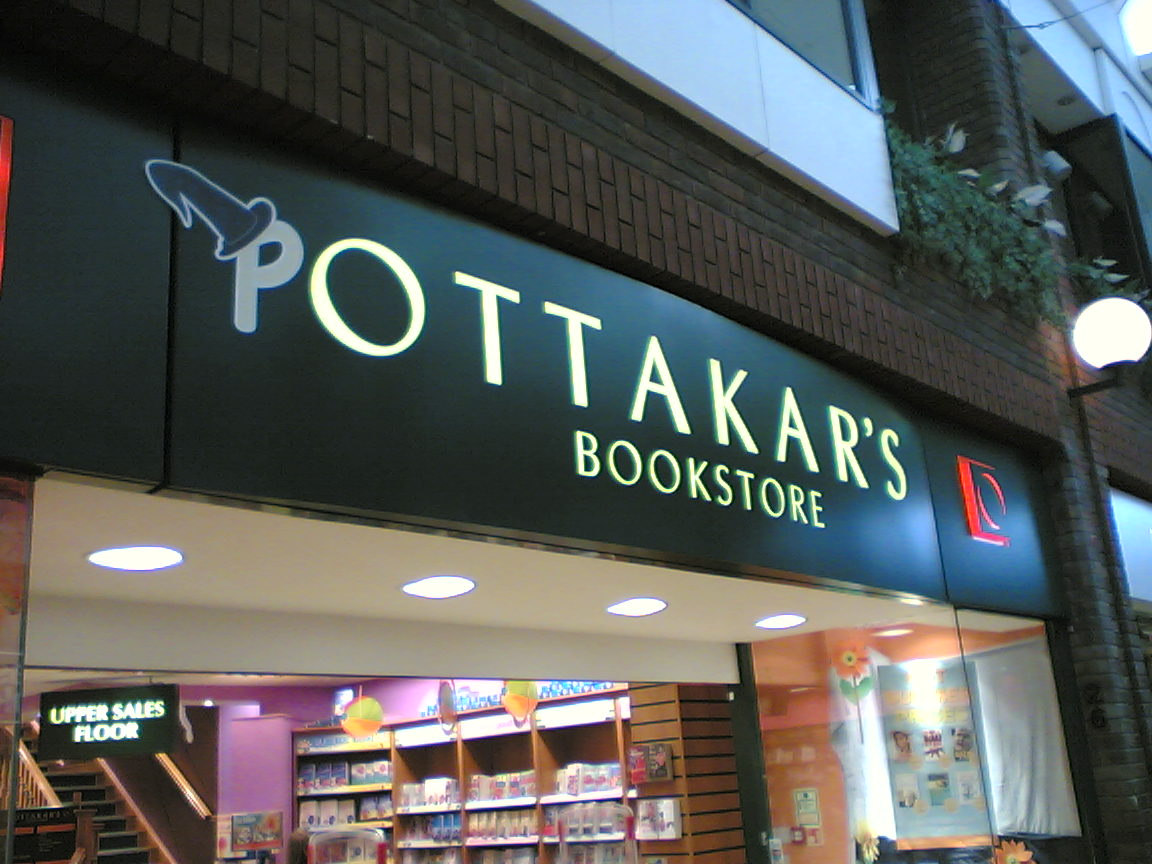
Ottakar's renamed its stores for the Harry Potter launch.

James Heneage established the Ottakar's chain in 1987, taking inspiration from The Adventures of Tintin book King Ottokar's Sceptre. He saw a lucrative market in small towns that lacked a Waterstones branch and opened stores in Loughborough, Brighton, Banbury, Salisbury and Trowbridge. A number of Ottakar's stores drew on the Tintin connection and had walls painted with scenes from the series. The Ottakar store in Bromley, London had a large rocket taken from the Tintin novels so that children could play inside it. Above the rocket was a cartoon picture of the night sky to add to the effect.

The company was listed on the London Stock Exchange in 1998 and expanded rapidly, making a number of acquisitions including small bookstores in the West Country, eight branches of James Thin Booksellers in 2002, and twenty-four branches of Hammicks Bookshops Ltd, a company with 35 years of bookselling history, in April 2003. By mid-2006, the chain had shops in 141 locations throughout the United Kingdom.

In an attempt to compete with online booksellers, Ottakar's established an online ordering service. After turning a loss, the service was withdrawn in 2001, but by 2006, the company had hoped to relaunch their internet arm before the takeover by HMV.

Ottakar's was well known in the book trade for the exceptionally high morale and commitment of its staff. Damien Horner, from the advertising agency Mustoes commented that Ottakar's "was more like a religious cult than a business".

Ottakar's was also very popular with book buyers. In 2003, the company won the Reader's Digest Bookselling Company of the Year award at the British Book Awards. A customer survey in 2004 revealed that many people believed that their local branch of Ottakar's was an independent bookshop. This was viewed as a vindication of the Ottakar's head office policy of giving branches as much local autonomy as possible. However, some suggested that Ottakar's had a weak national brand, which was vulnerable to changing market conditions.

=== Children's Book Prize ===
The Ottakar's Children's Book Prize was an annual award given to a work of children's literature published during the previous year. First awarded in 2005, the purpose of the prize was "to uncover hidden talent in children's writing" and was therefore open only to authors who have published no more than three books. When all Ottakar's stores were rebranded as Waterstone's following the HMV Group takeover of the Ottakar's chain, the prize also changed its name to become the Waterstone's Children's Book Prize.

== Takeover ==
In August 2005, amid rumours of a forthcoming takeover attempt by HMV Group plc, the owners of Ottakar's (founders James Heneage and Philip Dunne backed by private equity firm Phoenix Equity Partners) made a management buyout offer which was initially accepted by Ottakar's independent directors, some of whom had only recently joined the company. When a higher offer was made by HMV, the owners switched their recommendation to accept the HMV bid.

The Office of Fair Trading was due to decide whether to approve the buyout of Ottakar's by Waterstone's on 2 December 2005. On 6 December the OFT referred the case to the Competition Commission. The Competition Commission provisionally cleared HMV Group, through Waterstone's, for takeover of the Ottakar's group on 30 March 2006. The Commission stated that the takeover would "not result in a substantial lessening of competition", and was "not likely to affect book prices, range of titles offered or quality of service." Through extensive research they also found that "contrary to widespread perception, Waterstone's, like Ottakar's, operates a book-buying system which mixes central and local input on stock selection."

Waterstone's then announced that it had successfully negotiated a takeover of Ottakar's on 31 May 2006 with an agreed cash offer of £62.8 million. HMV chief executive Alan Giles said in a statement: "A combined Waterstone's and Ottakar's business will create an exciting, quality bookseller, able to respond better to the increasingly competitive pressures of the retail market." Ottakar's chairman Philip Dunne said: "Over the last year the book market has undergone a significant change with new levels of competition from the supermarkets and online retailers impacting all specialist booksellers and in particular those with insufficient scale to compete on equal terms."

By Christmas 2006, all stores were converted and rebranded as Waterstone's; Ottakar's name was discarded after the takeover.

== See also ==
- Books in the United Kingdom
