= Maxim Mnyakin =

Russian entrepreneur

Maxim G. Mnyakin
- Максим Григорьевич Мнякин
- Born: 8 July 1981 (age 45); Tynda, Amur Region, USSR
- Citizenship: Russia
- Education: Peter the Great St. Petersburg Polytechnic University
- Occupation: Businessman
- Years active: 1998-present
- Organization(s): Technologiya LLC, BMS LLC, Teletie LLC
- Known for: Leader in Russian telecommunications companies

Maxim Mnyakin (Russian: Максим Григорьевич Мнякин; born on 8 July 1981) is a Russian entrepreneur, economist, and General Director of Teletie LLC.

== Early life and education ==
Maxim Grigoryevich Mnyakin was born on 8 July 1981 in Tynda into a family of builders of the Baikal–Amur Mainline.

After graduating from high school in 1998, Maxim Mnyakin entered the Faculty of Humanities of St Petersburg Polytechnic University, from which he graduated in 2003 with a Bachelor of Science (Specialist) degree in Social and Organizational Management.

In 2013, he defended his PhD thesis on «Management Outsourcing in Tourism».

== Career ==
In 2003, he became General Director of WEST LLC (St Petersburg). He combined research and development activities with his work in the real economy, being a managing partner, investor and project manager of various projects at the same time.

In 2005, Mnyakin became the founder and development director, then General Director of Technologiya LLC. Technologiya signed a dealer agreement with the European mobile operator Top Connect, under which it represented the operator in the Russian Federation with its international travel SIM card product, which it sold under its own registered brand Simtravel. The project, initiated and successfully implemented by Maxim Mnyakin, was one of Russia's first international travel SIM cards.

In 2007, he became managing partner of BMS LLC. BMS, owned by Maxim, was one of the leaders in the Russian market for selling non-food products through vending machines at airports in major Russian cities such as Moscow, St Petersburg, Sochi, Ekaterinburg, Kazan, Volgograd, Samara, Krasnoyarsk and others. The network has more than 250 machines installed. The company's partners include such well-known companies as TOY.RU, Deppa, ELARI, mobile operators MTS, Megafon, Beeline, Tele2, Sberbank Mobile and others.

In 2010, Simtravel was included in the Encyclopedia of Communications and Broadcasting as a leader among Russian mobile operators. This international tourist SIM card operates in more than 200 countries with a single international number, has more than 5,000 points of sale within the Russian Federation and is represented in virtually all cellular retail chains and leaders. The company opened representative offices in Moldova, Georgia and Ukraine. The total volume of Simtravel sim cards sold to date has reached more than 1 million.

In 2012 his Simtravel project was included in the all-Russia reference book Who's Who in Telecommunications. The book contains biographies of the most famous and influential figures in the Russian telecommunications market.

From 2012, he was General Director of Teletie LLC, a Russian business-class online operator with a fully organized remote-distance subscriber service structure. The project operated in more than 40 regions of Russia and had a subscriber base of over 200,000. Since 2013, he has been Director of Development at Telestandart LLC. The company has more than 300 telephone operators.

During the 2018 FIFA World Cup 2018 in Russia, Maxim Mnyakin and BMC entered into a licensing agreement to sell official World Cup merchandise and souvenirs at Russian airports via vending machines. According to the results of this work, Maxim Mnyakin was noted as the head of the company that showed the best results among all the license agreements concluded in Russia.

For Maxim Mnyakin, telecommunications is the most fascinating field. In 2021, it initiated a new project — the sale of Simtravel SIM cards in the new e-Sim format — the electronic SIM card.

In 2021, he launched a start-up, LiloPhoto which is a professional, automated, photo studio without photographer that produces quality portrait images with a simple, straightforward and user-friendly interface. All hardware units are optimized by specially developed software, a control terminal and a unique user interface. Studios have been installed in major shopping malls and airports in Moscow.

In 2022, he founded and registered I ONE COMPANY in the United States. The company's first project was a fully automated professional photo studio, Lilophoto. I ONE COMPANY has contracts with well-known American companies such as Tanger Factory Outlet Centers, Inc. and Simon Property Group, Inc. Automated photo studios have been installed in major shopping malls in Philadelphia and Georgia as well as in Florida.

== Other positions ==
In 2016, Maxim Mnyakin was a member of the jury of the Effie Awards Russia 2015. Effie Russia is a national competition for one of the world's most prestigious marketing awards, the EFFIE AWARDS.

== Publications ==
- M. Mnyakin. Investigating the Impacts of AR, AI, and Website Optimization on Ecommerce Sales Growth // ResearchBerg Review of Science and Technology (2020), 3 (1), 116–130.
- M. Mnyakin. Granger Causality between International Tourism and International Trade // Applied Research in Artificial Intelligence and Cloud Computing (2018), 1 (1), 1–9.
- M. Mnyakin. An Empirical Investigation of the Determinants of Vending Machine Sales Volume // Journal of Artificial Intelligence and Machine Learning in Management (2021), 5 (1).
- M. Mnyakin. Applications of AI, IoT, and Cloud Computing in Smart Transportation: A Review // Artificial Intelligence in Society (2023), 3 (1), 9-27.
- M. Mnyakin. Implementing Sustainable Supply Chain 4.0 in Small and Medium-sized Enterprises (SMEs): A Review // International Journal of Intelligent Automation and Computing (2023), 6 (1), 1–16.
- M. Mnyakin. Big Data in the Hospitality Industry: Prospects, Obstacles, and Strategies // International Journal of Business Intelligence and Big Data Analytics (2023), 6 (1).
- M Mnyakin. Challenges and Opportunities of Integrating Autonomous Vehicles into Urban Retail Delivery Services // Reviews of Contemporary Business Analytics (2023), 6 (1), 14–28.

== Literature ==
- Who's Who in Russian Telecommunications 2003: Brief biographical ref. book / Anvar Amirov. Moscow: ROO Center Panorama, 2003. — 149 p. — (Series: Business) ISBN 5-94420-014-6
- Encyclopaedia of Communication and Broadcasting. Russia, 2011/2012 / joint project: Comnews, VympelCom, etc.; chief editor L. Konik. — Moscow, — 2012. — 367 p. ISBN In reed.; ISSN 2076-3832
