= James Daunt =

British business executive

James Daunt CBE
- Born: Achilles James Daunt; 18 October 1963 (age 63)
- Education: Sherborne School; Pembroke College; Cambridge University
- Occupations: Managing Director, Waterstones
- Known for: Founder, Daunt Books
- Spouse: Katy Steward
- Children: 2 daughters
- Parent(s): Sir Timothy Daunt; Patricia Susan Knight
- Relatives: Achilles Daunt (great-great grandfather)

Achilles James Daunt CBE (born 18 October 1963) is a British businessman. He is the founder of the Daunt Books chain, and since May 2011 has been managing director of the bookshop chain Waterstones. Since August 2019, Daunt has also been CEO of Barnes & Noble, the American bookstore chain. He was once described in 2014 in an article in the Evening Standard as "the man who saved Waterstones". He faced criticism in 2019 for saying Waterstones 'was not profitable enough' to pay staff the Living Wage, following an appeal supported by 1,300 authors.

== Early life and education ==
Achilles James Daunt was born on 18 October 1963, the son of the diplomat Sir Timothy Daunt and his wife Patricia Susan Knight. He has two younger sisters, Alice and Eleanor.

Daunt attended boarding school from the age of seven until adulthood. For his secondary education, he attended the Sherborne School. Daunt refused to attend compulsory church services, receiving detention on a weekly basis. Hugh Bonneville was a friend and peer.

After Sherborne, Daunt read history at Pembroke College, Cambridge University. He studied under David Abulafia, with an especial focus on the Crusades and the Islamic Golden Age. After each academic year, Daunt traveled with a group of friends from Brussels to Syria via car, following the route of medieval Crusaders.

== Career ==
His first job was as a purser with Carnival Cruise Lines.

After working in the US as a banker for JP Morgan between 1985 and 1988, he founded Daunt Books in 1990, a chain of six bookshops in London.

In May 2011, he was appointed managing director of Waterstones by the company's new owner, the Russian billionaire Alexander Mamut. The pair were listed at fourth place in a 2011 Guardian list of the top 100 people in the British books industry.

Daunt was elected an Honorary Fellow of the Royal Society of Literature in 2017.

In June 2019, he became the CEO of the US bookshop chain Barnes & Noble, acquired by Waterstones' parent, Elliott Advisors (UK) for $683m.

Daunt was appointed Commander of the Order of the British Empire (CBE) in the 2022 Birthday Honours for services to publishing.

== Personal life ==
Daunt is married to Katy Steward, a professional in the health sector. They have two daughters and live in Hampstead; they also have homes in Suffolk and on the Isle of Jura in Scotland.

Business positions
Preceded by Dominic Myers	Managing Director of Waterstones; May 2011 -	Succeeded by Incumbent
