= Evgeny Chichvarkin =

Russian entrepreneur

- Евгений Чичваркин
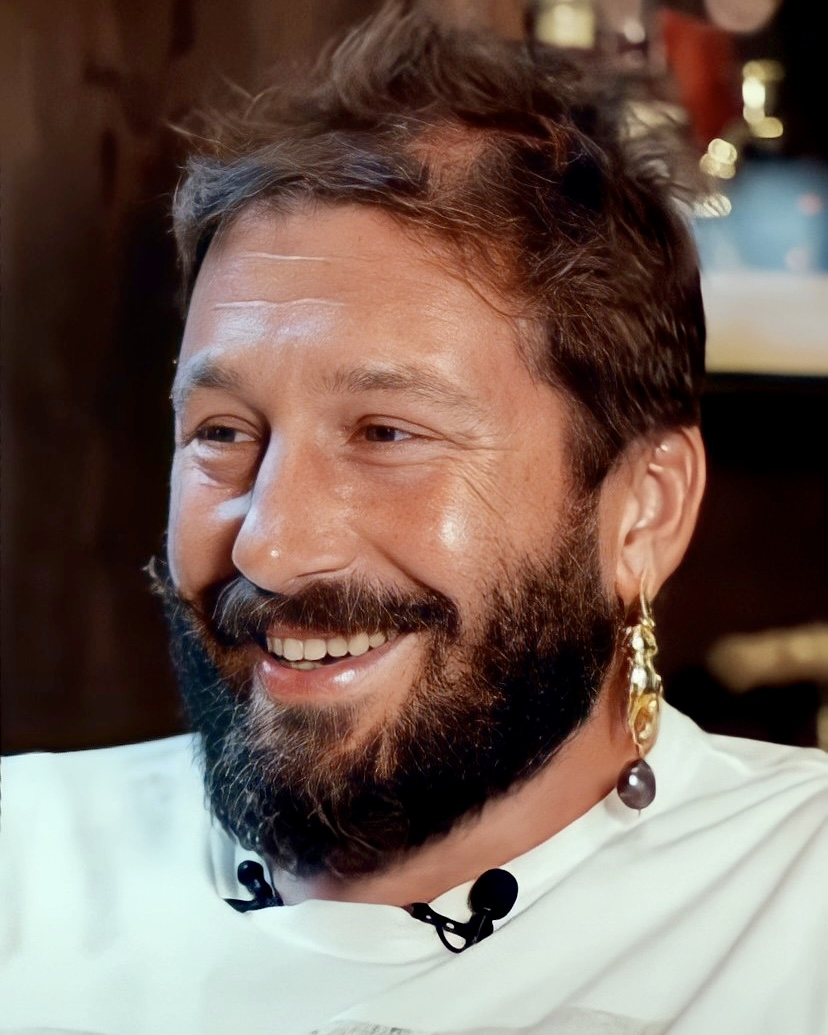
- Chichvarkin in 2019
- Born: Evgeny Aleksandrovich Chichvarkin; 10 September 1974 (age 51); Leningrad, RSFSR, Soviet Union
- Education: State University of Management
- Children: 4 (Yaroslav, Marta, Alisa, Lev)

Evgeny Aleksandrovich Chichvarkin (Russian: Евге́ний Алекса́ндрович Чичва́ркин; born on the 10th of September 1974 in Leningrad, RSFSR, Soviet Union) is a Russian entrepreneur who founded the largest Russian mobile phone retailer, Euroset. This made him the richest man under the age of 35 in his country, with an approximate worth of $1.6 billion.

He has received a number of public awards including 2004 Person of the Year in the Head of Retail Business category. The winner of the Ernst & Young contest "Entrepreneur of the Year 2005" in the Nomination "Trade".

In 2006 he was awarded the Order of Saint Alexander Nevsky "For Labor and the Fatherland" in the nomination "Industry Leader". In 2006 he was awarded the Order of Glory of Russia for his great personal contribution to the development of the best traditions of Russian entrepreneurship. In 2007, at the Grand Prix of the "Person of the Year 2006" Chichvarkin was awarded the Order of Glory of the Fatherland.

He was a member of the Right Cause political party and was expected to become chairman of its Moscow section. Chichvarkin currently lives in London, from where he has campaigned against corruption in Russia and president Vladimir Putin personally.

In August 2012, he launched the wine store "Hedonism Wines" on Davies Street in Mayfair, London.

== Biography ==
Chichvarkin was born in Leningrad in 1974, from mother Lyudmila of Russian Tatar descent and father Aleksandr from Moscow; his great-great-grandfather was Moksha. His father was a pilot and his mother was an economist working for the Soviet Ministry of Foreign Trade; during his childhood, the family moved to Moscow.

From 1991 to 1996 Chichvarkin studied at the State University of Management, as well as earning money trading on Moscow flea markets. After graduating Chichvarkin started studying for a PhD (Kandidat), which he abandoned in 1998.

== Euroset Company ==
In 1997 Chichvarkin and his friend Timur Artemev started a business named Yevroset to sell mobile phones. In 2002 Yevroset became one of the top three Moscow mobile phone retailers, with 92 retail outlets. The company opened 100 more outlets in 2002, 117 more outlets in 2003, 800 more outlets in 2004, 1934 more outlets in 2005, etc. In 2007 they had 5156 outlets in 12 countries: Russia, Ukraine, Belarus, Moldova, Estonia, Latvia, Lithuania, Kazakhstan, Kyrgyzstan, Armenia and Azerbaijan.

In June 2005, Yevroset received the "Superbrand-2005" public award, in October 2005 "Brand of the Year / EFFIE 2005" awards and in December 2005 "The Company of the Year" in the nomination "Business Reputation". Euroset is holder of the Diploma of the Russian Foundation for the Protection of Consumer Rights.

On 21 September 2008, Evgeny Chichvarkin sold Euroset to Alexander Mamut, the owner of investment company ANN and internet portal "Live Journal".

== Right Cause political party ==
In November 2008 Chichvarkin joined Right Cause, a Russian liberal democratic political party founded on 16 November 2008 as a merger of the Union of Right Forces, Civilian Power and the Democratic Party of Russia.

== Criminal prosecution ==
In August 2005 Chichvarkin was accused of involvement in the illegal import of a $100 million shipment of mobile phones, but the accusations were eventually dropped. In March 2006 a large consignment of Motorola mobile phones shipped for Chichvarkin was seized on the pretext that their emissions of microwave radiation exceeded the levels permitted by Russian health regulations. After those cases Chichvarkin accused Russian law-enforcement agencies of corporate raiding.

In March 2007 Chichvarkin was mentioned by the media in connection with the case of Dmitry Sidorov, the founder ‘’Iled M’’, who was accused of large scale tax avoidance. Iled M had sold mobile phones to Yevroset as well as to other retailers. In August 2007 the apartments of many Yevroset employees were searched by police. Some experts considered the searches to be connected with the Idel M case, while other saw it as a continuation of Motorola case. Others still viewed it as a marketing ploy by Yevroset themselves (the last chance to buy their phones before they are confiscated), others as a siloviks’ revenge on Chichvarkin.

In September 2008 the headquarters of Euroset were searched in connection with its handling of Andrey Vlaskin, a Yevroset employee who in 2003 stole mobile phones worth around 20 million Russian roubles (approximately US$1 million). Vlaskin was caught by Yevroset security in Tambov, moved to Moscow to a Euroset-owned apartment and after some time agreed to compensate Euroset for their losses. While between 2004 and 2007 Euroset and Vlaskin apparently had no claims on each other, in 2008 Euroset was accused of kidnapping, illegal imprisonment and extortion.

On 21 September 2008 Chichvarkin sold 100% of Euroset stock to Alexander Mamut. The volume of the transaction was US$400 million.

In January 2009 Chichvarkin moved to the United Kingdom and on 23 January 2009 on Russian federal search list in connection with the Vlaskin case. On 28 January the Basmanny Court of Moscow approved Chichvarkin's arrest (in absentia). On 12 March 2009 his details were passed to Interpol. On 13 April 2009 the Investigative Committee of the Prosecutor General of Russia noticed that a key investigator of Chichvarkin's case, Vladimir Knyazyev, had previously been sentenced for stealing a large consignment of mobile phones from Chichvarkin's Euroset. During the 2007 contraband case he had forged the act of destroying the phones confiscated as evidence. The investigation committee demanded the dismissal of Knyazyev because of the conflict of interest but their demands were refused. On 17 November 2010 the jury found all the defendants in the Vlaskin case not guilty.

The prosecution's appeal to the Supreme Court was rejected on 20 January 2011 and Chichvarkin's indictment was withdrawn a few days later.

His lawyer Yuri Gervis noted that Chichvarkin is still worried that he might be charged again in connection with the 2005 contraband case.

International search of Euroset Evgeny Chichvarkin has been discontinued. As reported on 25 January 2011 by an official representative of the National Central Bureau (NCB) of Interpol at the Interior Ministry Olga Shklyarov, it is due to the termination of criminal proceedings against Chichvarkin under Article 24 of the Code (the absence of a crime).

While in London Chichvarkin has participated in protests highlighting the dangers of conducting business in Russia, referring to the cases of Mikhail Khodorkovsky and Sergei Magnitsky. He is aware of being observed by “men with russian behaviour”.

In 2014 he started warning of multiple wars if Putin's Russia is not stopped by the western world. In 2019 he accused Putin of steering Russia into a war with non-existent enemies.

== Hedonism Wines ==
In August 2012 Chichvarkin launched his new wine store Hedonism Wines on London's Davies Street.

Hedonism Wines has received a number of public awards including Wine Merchant of the 2013 Year at the DWWA 2013, Best Leisure Food and Drink Shop at the Retail Week Interiors Awards 2014, Best Speciality Food and Beverage Store 2014 at The Mayfair Awards 2014, Independent Retailer of the Year at the DB AWARDS 2015, Best Leisure Food and Drink Shop of the Year at the Retail Week Interiors Awards 2015, Independent Wine Retailer of the Year 2015 at the 2015 Drinks Retailing Awards, Best Speciality Food and Beverage Store 2015 at The Mayfair Awards 2015, Independent Spirits Retailer of the Year at the 2018 Drinks Retailing Awards, Best Window Display 2017 at The Mayfair Awards 2017, Luxury Retailer of the Year at the 2017 Drinks Retailing Awards, Luxury Retailer of the Year at the 2018 Drinks Retailing Awards.
