= Alexander Mamut =

Russian billionaire businessman

- Александр Мамут
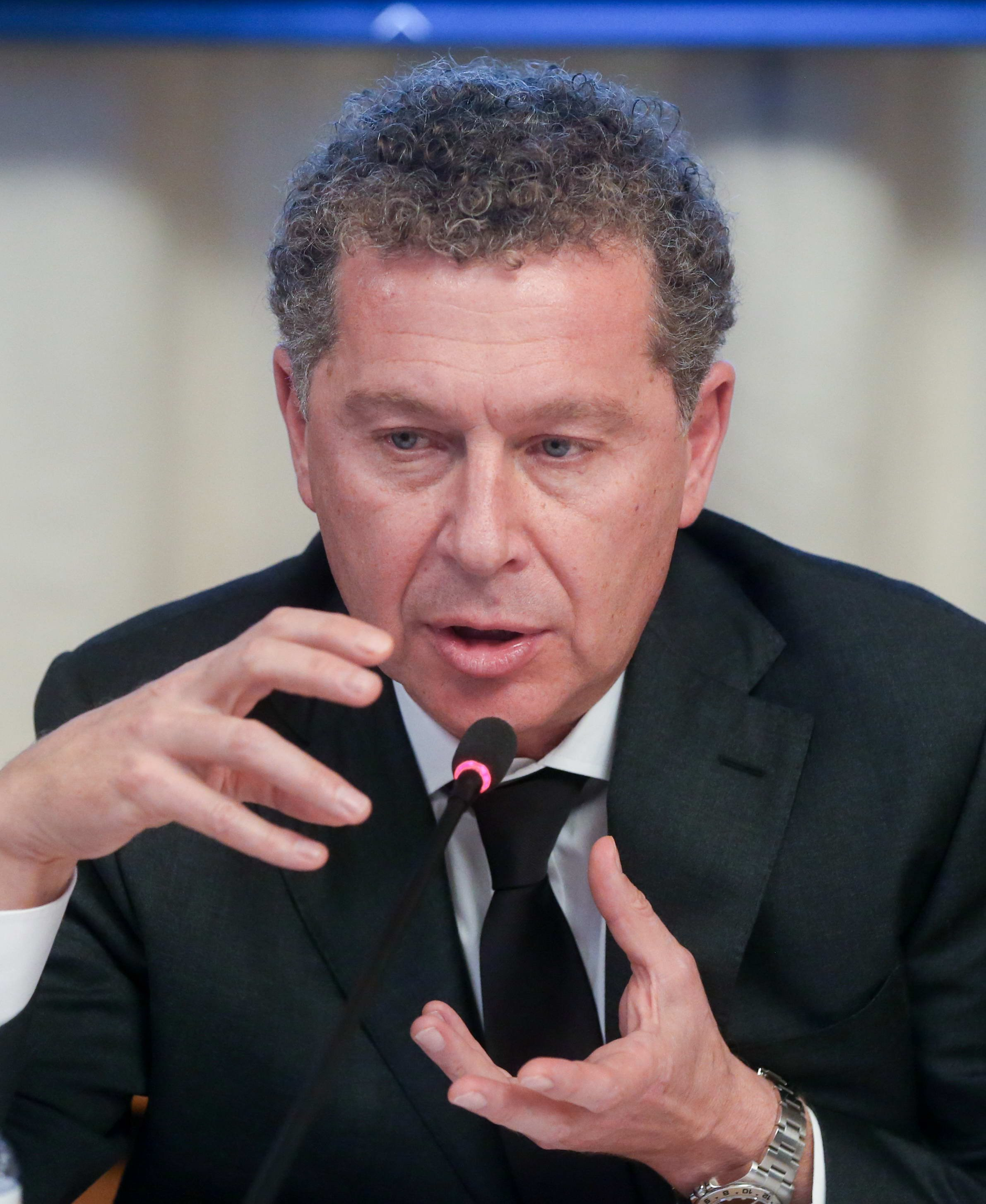
- Mamut in 2018
- Born: 29 January 1960 (age 66); Moscow, Russia
- Citizenship: Russian, Israeli
- Education: Moscow State University
- Occupations: Businessman and investor
- Known for: advisor to Boris Yeltsin
- Spouse: Widowed
- Children: 5

Alexander Leonidovich Mamut (Russian: Алекса́ндр Леони́дович Маму́т; born 29 January 1960) is a Russian-Israeli billionaire, oligarch, lawyer, banker and investor. Until 2020, he was a co-owner of Rambler Group.

In June 2022, Forbes estimated Mamut's net worth at $2 billion.

== Early life and education ==
Alexander Mamut was born on 29 January 1960. His father is Leonid Solomonovich Mamut, a lawyer and one of the authors of the Russian Constitution. His mother, Cicilia Ludwigovna, is a defense attorney. In 1977, Mamut graduated from Moscow gymnasium #17. He studied law at Moscow State University, graduating in 1982.

== Career ==
Mamut began his career as a legal advisor at a printing house.

In 1990, together with Andrey Gloriozonov, Mamut founded "Business and Cooperation” Bank, that was renamed in 1991 into Commercial Bank "Imperial" (Note: Commercial Bank "Imperial" was involved with financially supporting the East-West United Bank in Luxembourg while it was liquidating VEB's debts during the 1990s.) with Segey Rodionov as chairman and President of the Board. The bank was founded to service companies in the field of fuel and energy. Its biggest clients were the Rem Viakhirev (Note: In addition to Gazprom, Rem Viakhirev was also the Chairman of the Board of Trustees of Commercial Bank "Imperial" after the resignation in July 1994 of Vladimir Chirskov. Viakhirev was the chairman of the board of Imperial Bank from July 1994 until June 1995.) associated Gazprom and the Vagit Alekperov (Note: In June 1995, Vagit Alekperov replaced Rem Viakhirev as chairman of the board of Commercial Bank "Imperial". Although Viakhirev resigned as chairman of the board of Imperial Bank in June 1995, Gazprom continued to maintain its accounts with Imperial Bank.) (Note: Because of the very large debt that Ukraine allegedly owed Gazprom by August 1995, the Oleg Boyko, who is allegedly a KGB agent, associated National Credit Bank (Russian: банк "Национальный кредит", AКБ "Национальный кредит"), instead of Imperial Bank, serviced a $1.4 billion Ukraine government bonded loan.) (Note: During 1997, Pavlo Matvienko became associated with National Credit Bank.) associated Lukoil.

In 1990 Mamut founded ALM-Consulting law firm (ALM abbreviated after Mamut's name) and served as Managing Partner there throughout 1990–1993. In 1991, ALM Consulting partnered with Frere Cholmeley Bischoff, a law firm based in London and headed by Tim Razzall from 1990 to 1994, in order to establish many offshore shell companies with which ALM Consulting would create the offshore shell company through Frere Cholmeley Bischoff for $300 and then ALM Consulting would sell that same offshore shell company for $5000. In 1993, Roman Kolodkin (Note: Later, from 5 November 2009 until 15 September 2015, Roman Kolodkin was the Russian Ambassador to the Netherlands.) introduced Mamut to Igor Shuvalov who worked at the Russia's Ministry of Foreign Affairs in the legal department as an attache. According to an interview published in the Russian independent newspaper Meduza, Mamut hired Shuvalov as a senior advisor to ALM. On behalf of the company, Shuvalov conducted special assignments with offshore companies and transported money. Such Russian oligarchs as Alisher Usmanov, Roman Abramovich, and Boris Berezovsky were among the largest clients of ALM Consulting in the 1990s.

During the 1990s, Mikhail Kasyanov, while he was the head of the department of external loans and foreign debt at the Russian Ministry of Finance, made decisions that benefitted Mamut.

Mamut founded the Design Bureau "Company of Project Financing" (KOPF) (Russian: ЗАО КБ "Компания по проектному финансированию" (ЗАО КБ "КОПФ")), which is a bank, in 1993, and served as its chief executive officer until 1998. In 1996, KOPF donated 280 million rubles to Boris Yeltsin's election campaign. Meanwhile, he was the co-founder and director of Sedmoy Continent from 1993 to 1997. He was the founder of ALM Development and remained an investor until 2001.

Mamut was Chairman of Moscow Business World (MDM-Bank) (Russian: «Московский Деловой Мир» (МДМ)) or Moskovsky Delovoy Mir (MDM) from 1999 to 2002.

Mamut made donations to Boris Yeltsin's 1996 re-election campaign. He was an economic adviser to the chief of the Russian presidential administration, Alexander Voloshin from 1998 to 1999.

On 31 May 1999, Mamut was elected to the board of directors of Sobinbank (Russian: Собинбанк).

Mamut's "A&NN" Investment Company acquired 100% of shares of Evroset from Evgeniy Chichvarkin and Timur Artemiev in 2008. By October 2008, he sold 49.9% to VimpelCom.

Mamut acquired 60% of the Spar Moscow Holding in 2009. He also acquired the Torpedo-ZIL football club for the symbolic price of $1. Two years later, in 2011, he invested in the Nomos-Bank. He is a large investor in Ingosstrakh, the insurance company, and Troika-Dialog, an investment bank. He has also invested in Polymetal International, a mining company, and PIK Group, a construction company.

=== Media ===
Mamut founded the SUP Company in 2006, and acquired LiveJournal Russia in 2007.

In May 2011, after James Daunt and Alexander Mamut were introduced through a mutual friend, Mamut acquired Waterstones, a UK-based bookstore chain, through Capital Fund Management Limited, a subsidiary of Mamut's A&NN company, for the equivalent of $66 million. Mamut then named James Daunt as the managing director of Waterstones, replacing Dominic Myers. Mamut later sold off a majority stake in April 2018 to Elliott Advisors, valuing the company at $250 million with N M Rothschild & Sons handling the deal, and Elliott retained James Daunt as CEO of Waterstones. (Note: In August, Elliott Management Corporation acquired Barnes & Noble turning Barnes & Noble into a privately held subsidiary of Elliott and named James Daunt the CEO of both Waterstones and Barnes & Noble with Daunt relocating from London to New York.)

Mamut became the sole owner of the SUP Media in December 2012. In 2013, he acquired Lenta.ru. By 2014, he became the Chairman of Rambler&Co.a Russian news website. In 2014, he fired Galina Timchenko, the editor of Lenta.ru, for publishing an interview with a far-right Ukrainian nationalist. She was replaced by a pro-Kremlin journalist.

He acquired sports betting firm Rambler in 2016, selling a 46.5 percent stake to Sberbank in December 2019. Mamut was subsequently involved in an intellectual property rights dispute between Rambler and Sberbank.

A&NN acquired two Moscow art-house cinemas, also showing some foreign mass market films - "Pioneer" in 2008, and the Khudozhestvenny in 2016. In 2017, they acquired movie chains Cinema Park and Formula Kino.

In 2020, Mamut sold Rambler to Sberbank. Sberbank acquired 45% of shares in Rambler Group from Mamut in 2020, whereby Sberbank's share in Rambler Group increased to 100%.

He fled Russia after the start of the Russian invasion of Ukraine in 2022, reportedly selling everything he had in Russia except his apartment before the military operations started. Forbes said his wealth was at $1.3B in Jan 2025, and that he lived in Tel Aviv, Israel.

== Personal life ==
Mamut is a widower from his second marriage. He has five children. As of 2016, he resided in Moscow, Russia, with a secondary residence in Kensington, London. He also owns a yacht. He has given grants of £200,000 to Eton College.
