= Alan Giles =

Alan James Giles OBE is a British businessman and currently a non-executive director of the Competition and Markets Authority. He is also a non-executive director of Rentokil Initial plc and a member of OFT's Audit and Risk Remuneration committees.

== Career ==
From March 1999 until September 2006 he was chief executive officer of HMV Group, owner of record shop HMV, which he joined in 1998.

HMV Group also owned the UK bookshop chain Waterstones, which bought another book chain Ottakars in 2006. HMV and Waterstones suffered a decline in sales in the financial year 2005–2006. Giles stated that the internet, including music downloading, and supermarket competition, contributed towards HMV's decline in sales.

After leaving HMV, he became chairman of Fat Face, the active lifestyle retailer.
