= Broad Street Independent Chapel, Reading =

Broad Street Independent Chapel
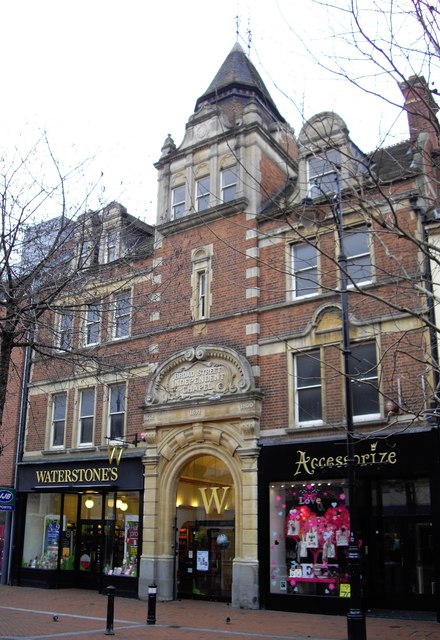
- The frontage building on Broad Street

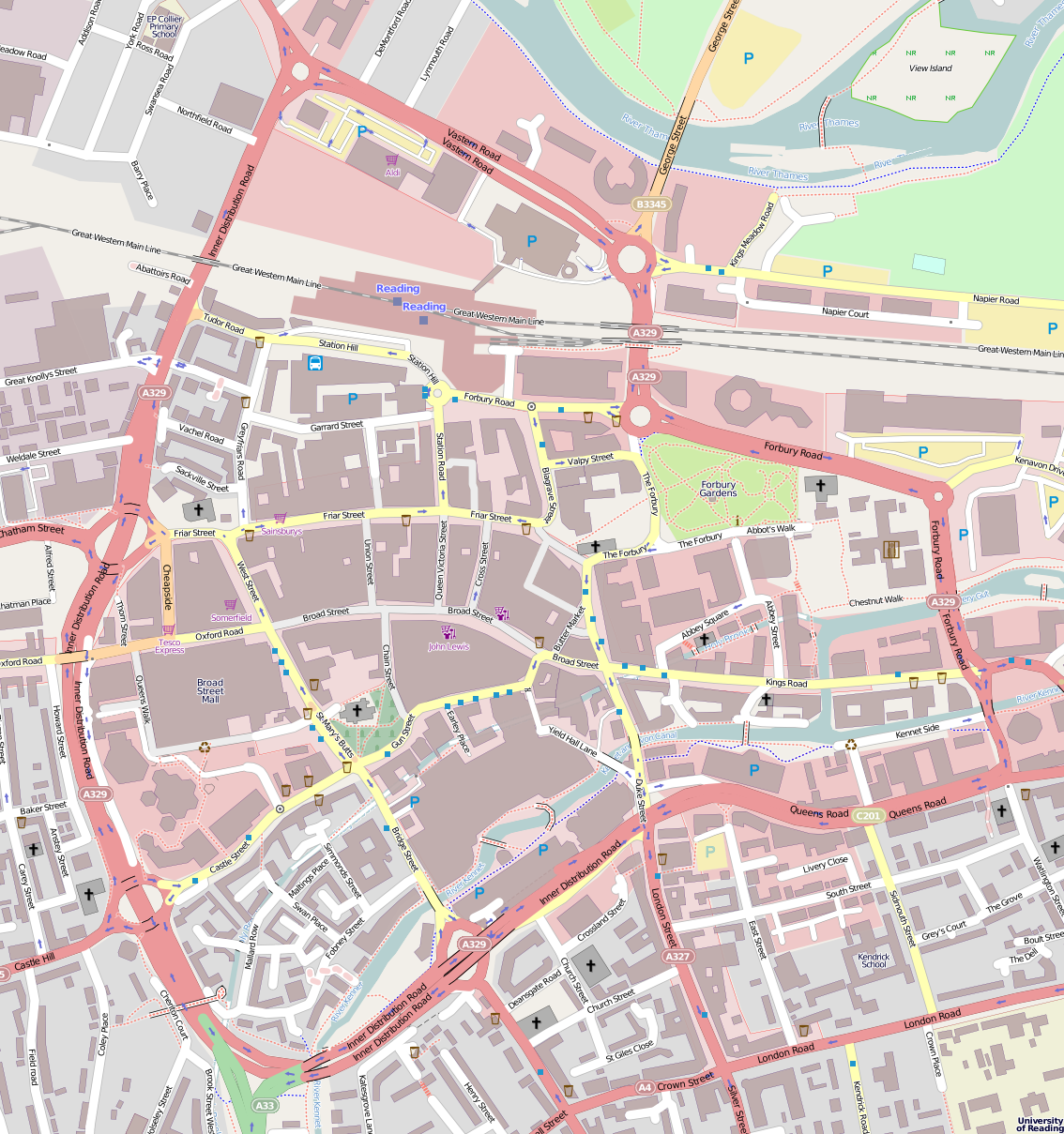
- Location within Reading Central

General information
- Type: Chapel
- Location: Reading, Berkshire, UK
- Coordinates: 51.4555°N 0.9734°W
- Construction started: 1707

Listed Building – Grade II
- Official name: Congregational Church and 89 and 89A Broad Street
- Designated: 14 December 1978
- Reference no.: 1321954

Broad Street Independent Chapel is a former nonconformist chapel dating from 1707. It is situated in Broad Street, now the principal shopping street of the English town of Reading. The building has been reused as a branch of the Waterstone's chain of bookshops. The building is a Grade II listed building.

== History ==
The main building was built in 1707, but was rebuilt in about 1800 and is set back from Broad Street. The interior is roughly square with encircling galleries, and a domed ceiling with modillion cornice. The central window of north gallery has stained glass copy of Burne-Jones's "Light of the World". Later additions were made to the side and rear of the original building. Historic England says its interior is 'a good example of a galleried non-conformist chapel in a prosperous market town'. In 1892 a separate frontage building was built along the building line of Broad Street, with an arch surmounted by a tower, itself capped by octagonal turret, and flanked by two shops.

In 1994 after the church closed a total of 47 burial vaults and three earth graves were uncovered during an archaeological recording action prior to commercial redevelopment of the site. From these 148 individuals were exhumed and the vaults examined. Finds including coffin plates and memorial and gravestones were deposited at Reading Museum.

Waterstone's now occupies both the chapel building and most of the frontage building (one shop unit being independently occupied). The frontage building has been linked to the main chapel by a lightweight modern glass-roofed conservatory. The galleries of the main chapel now form part of the shop, with a sweeping staircase in the centre linking the two floors.

Details of baptisms and marriages at the church between 1720 and 1837 are available on the International Genealogical Index produced by the LDS Church. William Blackall Simonds, the founder of H & G Simonds Brewery and J & C Simonds Bank, was baptised at the chapel on 13 August 1761.
