= The Fox and the Star =

First edition (publ. Penguin Books)

The Fox and the Star is an illustrated book by Coralie Bickford-Smith, a cover designer at Penguin Books. Published in 2015, it was chosen as that year's Waterstones Book of the Year, beating highly acclaimed contenders including Harper Lee’s Go Set a Watchman, Elena Ferrante’s My Brilliant Friend, Paula Hawkins’ The Girl on the Train, and A Little Life by Hanya Yanagihara.

== Origins ==
In December 2015, author Coralie Bickford-Smith wrote in UK newspaper The Guardian, "Although The Fox and the Star looks like a children's book I wanted the story to be something that resonated with adults as well. The page layout and design were heavily influenced by William Blake and William Morris, evoking a sense of illuminated manuscripts and traditional fairytales. Where I felt it appropriate I playfully dispensed with the strict layout and allowed the elements to break out into the margins." Bickford-Smith told The Guardian's Alison Flood that before writing the book, "I was thinking about how in life, if you hold on to something too tightly, you lose it, so to love something you have to let it go, and I wrote the story around that. It relates to so many situations – everyone has suffered – and it came together for me with losing my mum at an early age. Children seem to love the idea of the friends and the crazy illustrations, while adults like the concept of things being tough, but coming out the other side." Reporting on the theme of loss, the BBC quoted her saying, "It's about love, loss and learning to accept change. Everyone's been through loss. I lost my mum while I was at university, it resonated with that".

Bickford-Smith has said, "I'm all about the physical book. We haven’t released The Fox and the Star as an ebook because I don't think it would work – it's all about the paper. I wanted to create something which harked back to the beautiful visual thinking of William Morris and William Blake, so that people would really appreciate the book as an object."

== Plot ==
The book tells the story of Fox, who lives in the forest. One night he loses his only friend, Star, who until then lit his way through the trees every night. Forced to confront the blackness of the forest alone, Fox mourns his friend before learning how to enjoy life and the world again without his former companion.

== Critical reception ==
The Daily Telegraph's art critic Alastair Smart said: "The Fox and the Star has the mood of a classic fable about it, but the visuals are every bit as important here as the text. The predominant influence is William Morris, not only through his notion that books should be beautiful objects in their own right, but more specifically through adopting many of his aesthetic motifs. The intertwining leaves, plants and fronds Morris favoured as backgrounds to his fabrics now reappear as backdrops to many of this tale's pages."

== Awards ==
The Fox and the Star was the winner of the 2015 Waterstones Book of the Year Award. Other titles on the award's shortlist had included: Harper Lee's Go Set a Watchman, SPQR: A History of Ancient Rome by Mary Beard; My Brilliant Friend by Elena Ferrante; Reasons to Stay Alive by Matt Haig; The Girl on the Train by Paula Hawkins; The Shepherd's Life by James Rebanks and A Little Life by Hanya Yanagihara.

Presenting the award, Waterstones’ managing director James Daunt described The Fox and the Star as, "a book of great physical beauty and timeless quality, one that will surely join that very special group of classic tales that appeal equally to children and adults".

The AIGA and D&AD recognised the book covers, featuring in numerous international magazines and newspapers, including The New York Times, Vogue and The Guardian.
