= Waterstones =

British bookshop chain

Waterstones Booksellers Limited
- Formerly: Fine Recordings Club Limited (1958–1997); Waterstone's Booksellers Limited (1997–2012)
- Type: Private
- Industry: Retail; Bookshop
- Founded: Old Brompton Road, London, 1982; 44 years ago
- Founder: Tim Waterstone
- Headquarters: London, England, UK
- Number of locations: 316 shops (2025)
- Area served: United Kingdom, Ireland, Belgium, Netherlands
- Key people: James Daunt (MD)
- Products: Books, stationery
- Revenue: ▲£528.4 million (2024)
- Operating income: ▲£32.8 million (2024)
- Number of employees: 3,641 (2024)
- Parent: Elliott Management Corporation
- Subsidiaries: Barnes & Noble (Note: Through its subsidiary Waterstones Barnes & Noble Limited)
- Website: waterstones.com

Waterstones Booksellers Limited, trading as Waterstones (formerly Waterstone's), is a British book retailer based in London, United Kingdom, owned by the American investment group Elliott Investment Management. As of 2025, it operates 316 shops, mainly in the United Kingdom and other nearby countries. As of 2024 it employed over 3,600 staff in Britain and Europe. The average Waterstones branch sells a range of approximately 30,000 individual books, as well as stationery and other related products.

Founded in 1982 by Tim Waterstone, the bookseller expanded rapidly until being sold in 1993 to WHSmith. In 1998 Waterstones was bought by a consortium of Waterstone, EMI, and Advent International. The company was taken under the umbrella of HMV, which later merged the Dillons and Ottakar's brands into the company. Following several poor sets of results for the group, HMV put the chain up for sale. In May 2011 it was announced that A&NN Capital Fund Management, owned by the Russian billionaire businessman Alexander Mamut, had bought the chain for £53.5 million and appointed James Daunt as the managing director. The company is incorporated in England and Wales as Waterstones Booksellers Ltd, with its registered office at 203–206 Piccadilly, London (which is also the location of its flagship shop).

Waterstones also owns Hodges Figgis (the oldest bookshop in Ireland, founded in 1768), Hatchards (the oldest bookshop in Britain, founded in 1797), Foyles (a chain of seven bookshops in England) and Blackwell's.

In April 2018 the American investment-management firm Elliott Management Corporation bought a majority stake in the company.

The bookseller has concession agreements with Paperchase and previously had ones with the coffee chains Costa Coffee and Starbucks in some shops, but since 2012 has introduced its own Café W brand. For a time, Waterstones sold e-readers, including in 2012 partnering with Amazon to sell the Amazon Kindle, but has since pulled out of this market for commercial reasons.

Waterstones administers and supports various literary awards, including the Children's Laureate award and the Waterstones Children's Book Prize.

== History and developments ==
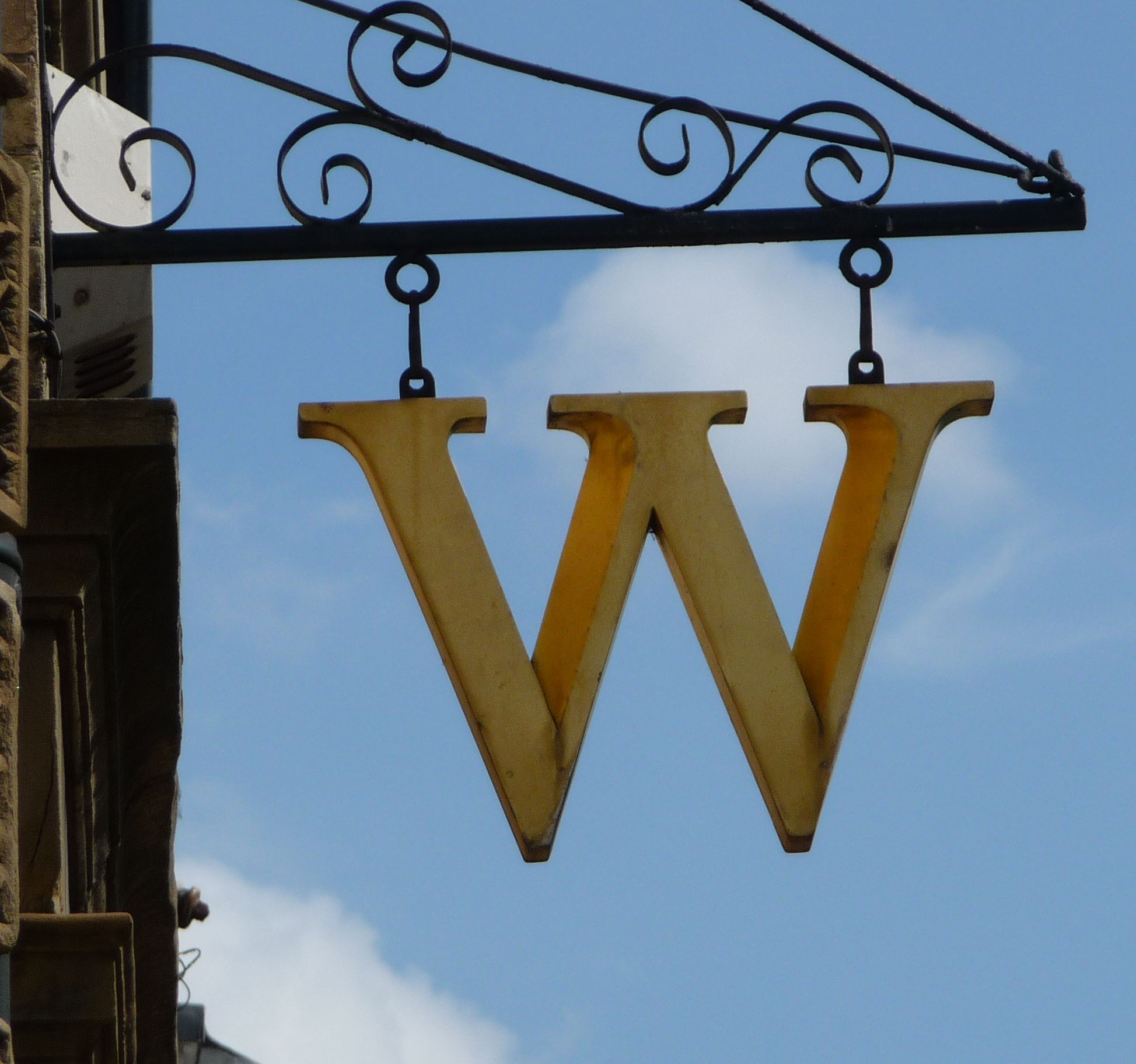
Early versions of shop signage were gold in colour.

=== Formation & WHSmith: 1982–1998 ===
The chain was founded in 1982 by Tim Waterstone after he took a £6,000 redundancy payout from WHSmith. He set up his first shop in Old Brompton Road, Kensington with the ambition of creating a "different breed of bookshop", using techniques he had seen in the United States. He used literary authors in front-of-shop displays and employed highly literate staff.

The model proved successful and the chain set about expanding its shop portfolio. In 1990 WHSmith took a strong minority stake in the chain, and ten years after its birth, by 1992, Waterstone's had grown to be the largest bookseller group in Europe. WHSmith then acquired the company in 1993 at an enterprise value of £47m, paying £5.27 a share on 8.1m 10p shares, a 53x multiple for the early-stage investors. Under WHSmith, Waterstones pursued international expansion, opening its first US shop in Boston in 1991, as well as further domestic expansion—opening its 100th UK shop in a former chapel in Reading.

The chain was part of the eventual dismantling of the Net Book Agreement, when in 1991, following a promotion by then-rivals Dillons, the company decided to pursue its own discounting promotion on selected titles. By 1997, the agreement had collapsed and been declared illegal.

=== HMV Group: 1998–2011 ===
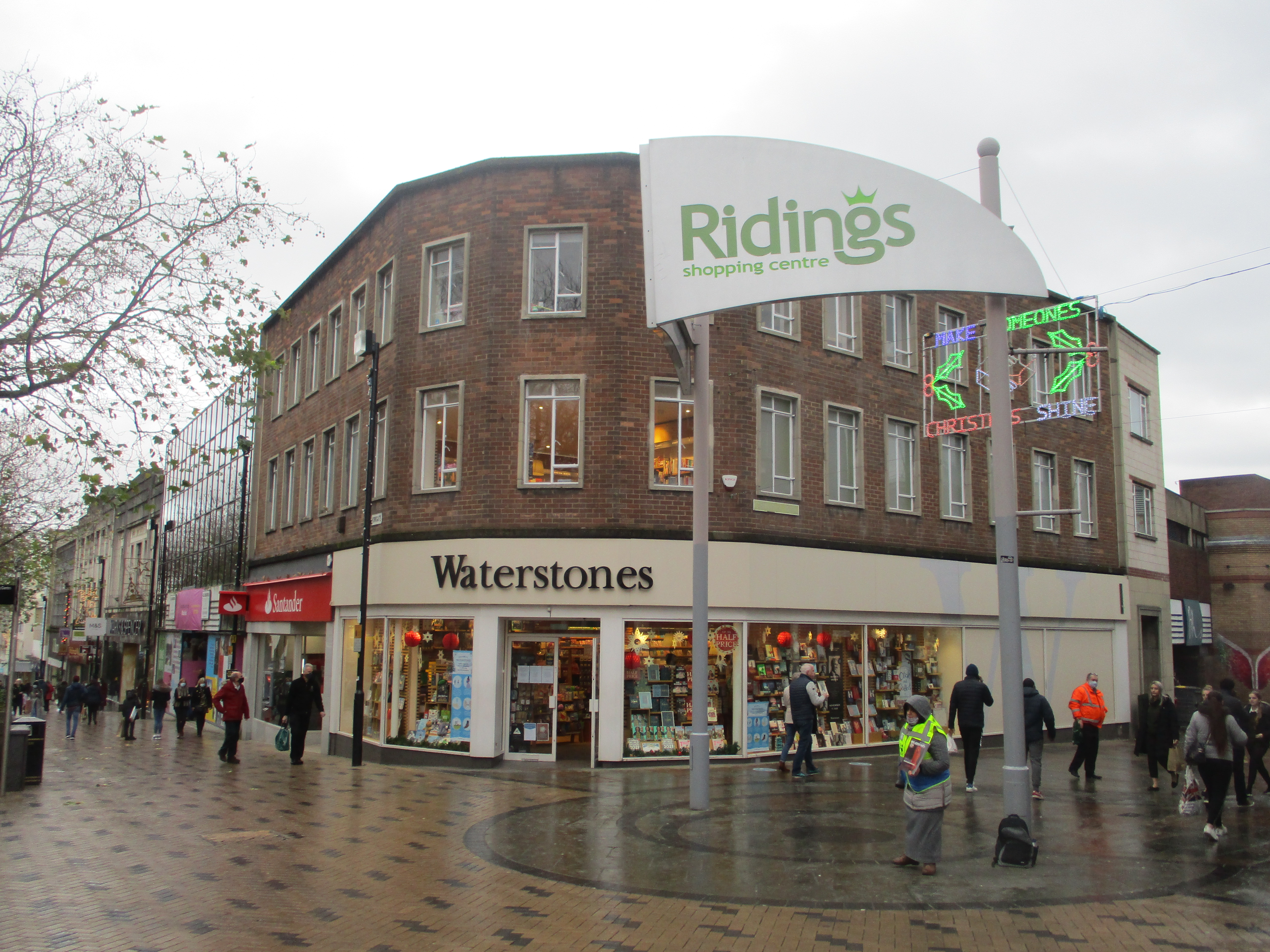
Waterstones in Wakefield occupies the city's former HMV branch.

WHSmith sold the Waterstones chain for £300 million to HMV Media plc (later HMV Group)—a joint venture between EMI, Advent International and Tim Waterstone. This included high-street brands HMV and rival Dillons, creating an international entertainment retailer. Waterstone was appointed chairman of the group but stood down in 2001, citing "concerns for the way the company was being run", and was replaced by Alan Giles. A year later, all Dillons shops were rebranded as Waterstones, with some sold to rival Ottakar's, making the brand defunct. The chain had also begun pulling out of its US overseas venture.

In 2001, Waterstones launched the Waterstones Books Quarterly magazine, containing book reviews and author interviews. In the same year, the booksellers' online operation, Waterstones.co.uk, was franchised to Amazon.com, with the company expressing a desire "to concentrate on its high street and campus shops". The move resulted in the loss of 50 jobs. In 2003, Waterstones announced it was supporting Dyslexia Action as its chosen charity, helping to raise awareness and understanding for dyslexia.

Waterstones logo until 2010

In 2006, Giles stepped down from his position and was replaced by Gerry Johnson as managing director of Waterstones and Simon Fox as group CEO. In April 2006, following two bids by Permira for the group, Tim Waterstone attempted to buy back the company from HMV for £256 million, but later withdrew his offer, specifying that the conditions set by HMV were "too punitive" to accept. A strategic review in September saw Waterstones pull out of its franchise agreement with Amazon to re-launch its online business, Waterstones.com, independently. The chain also began to pilot a loyalty programme in South-West England and Wales. The scheme was successful, launching nationally as The Waterstones Card across its entire shop portfolio.

Waterstones piloted a brand refresh exercise in selected shops, beginning with Manchester's Arndale Centre in 2007. On 19 November 2007, the chain closed its first branch on Old Brompton Road. Following a consultation, the company's supply chain was overhauled in 2008, with the implementation of a 150,000-square-foot (14,000 m^{2}) warehouse and distribution centre in Burton-upon-Trent. Existing direct-to-shop deliveries from suppliers were replaced by a centralised warehouse capable of receiving merchandise and sorting an estimated 70 million books per year, and 200 staff were made redundant by the process. In September 2008, Waterstones began selling the Sony Reader in an agreement that saw the booksellers' branches and Sony Centre shops stock the reader exclusively for two weeks after its release. Waterstones.com began to supply e-books in the .epub format. In November 2009, Waterstones moved into second-hand bookselling in a partnership with Alibris setting up an online reselling tool called Waterstones Marketplace, part of Waterstones.com.

A re-branding saw the logo change from Baskerville to FS Albert Pro until 2012.

In January 2010, HMV Group announced that Waterstones like-for-like sales over the Christmas period were down 8.5 per cent on the previous year. This culminated in the resignation of managing director Gerry Johnson, with immediate effect. He was replaced by development director Dominic Myers, who was managing director of the British academic bookselling chain Blackwells until 2005. Myers joined HMV in 2006 to oversee the integration of Ottakar's into the chain. In response to the decline in sales, he implemented a three-year plan in which branches were tailored to their local market alongside a 'rejuvenation' of the company brand and an increase in range. As part of these changes, Waterstones implemented new branding in May 2010, developed by agency VentureThree. The company also moved to support the Rainbow Trust, which provides support to children with life-threatening and terminal illnesses and their families, in the same year.

After an announcement that profits would be at the lower end of analysts' forecasts due to falling sales and a share price fall of 20%, HMV Group indicated its intention to close a number of Waterstones branches in January 2011. These shop closures, including two in Dublin, Ireland and nine others across the United Kingdom occurred in February 2011. Further branch closures in Luton, Dorking, Lancaster University, Harrods, Gateshead and Norwich Arcade were completed by the end of 2011.

=== Alexander Mamut & James Daunt: 2011–present ===
In May 2011, HMV Group announced the sale of Waterstones to A&NN Capital Fund Management, a fund controlled by Russian businessman Alexander Mamut for £53 million. The takeover was welcomed by publishers as "a step forward to re-establishing a proper physical presence". On 29 June 2011, the sale of Waterstones was completed and approved by the vast majority of shareholders at an emergency general meeting. Mamut appointed James Daunt, founder of Daunt Books, as managing director and, in October 2011, a board of directors was announced, including Miranda Curtis as chairman. In September 2011, the bookseller announced that it intended to drop its 3-for-2 deal on books after a decade. The offer was replaced with a "bespoke offer", based on branches choosing their own pricing structures from available discounts.

In January 2012, the company announced that it would be moving away from the branding developed in 2010 by agency VentureThree, and reverting to its original logo. This involved the removal of the apostrophe from its name because, James Daunt argued, "Waterstones without an apostrophe is, in a digital world of URLs and email addresses, a more versatile and practical spelling". This decision received media coverage, in which the company was subject to criticism. John Richards, of the Apostrophe Protection Society, said that the change was "just plain wrong" and "grammatically incorrect" while the move sparked outrage on Twitter, involving debate on whether the move was grammatically incorrect or not. Linguist David Crystal on his blog added: " ... if Waterstone's wants to become Waterstones, that's up to the firm. It's nothing to do with expressing possession or plurality or anything to do with meaning."

In the same month, Waterstones confirmed plans to open a Russian-language bookshop in its Piccadilly branch, intending to stock 5,000 titles, with the shop being entirely staffed by Russian-speaking booksellers. The concession, named The Russian Bookshop, opened in March 2012.

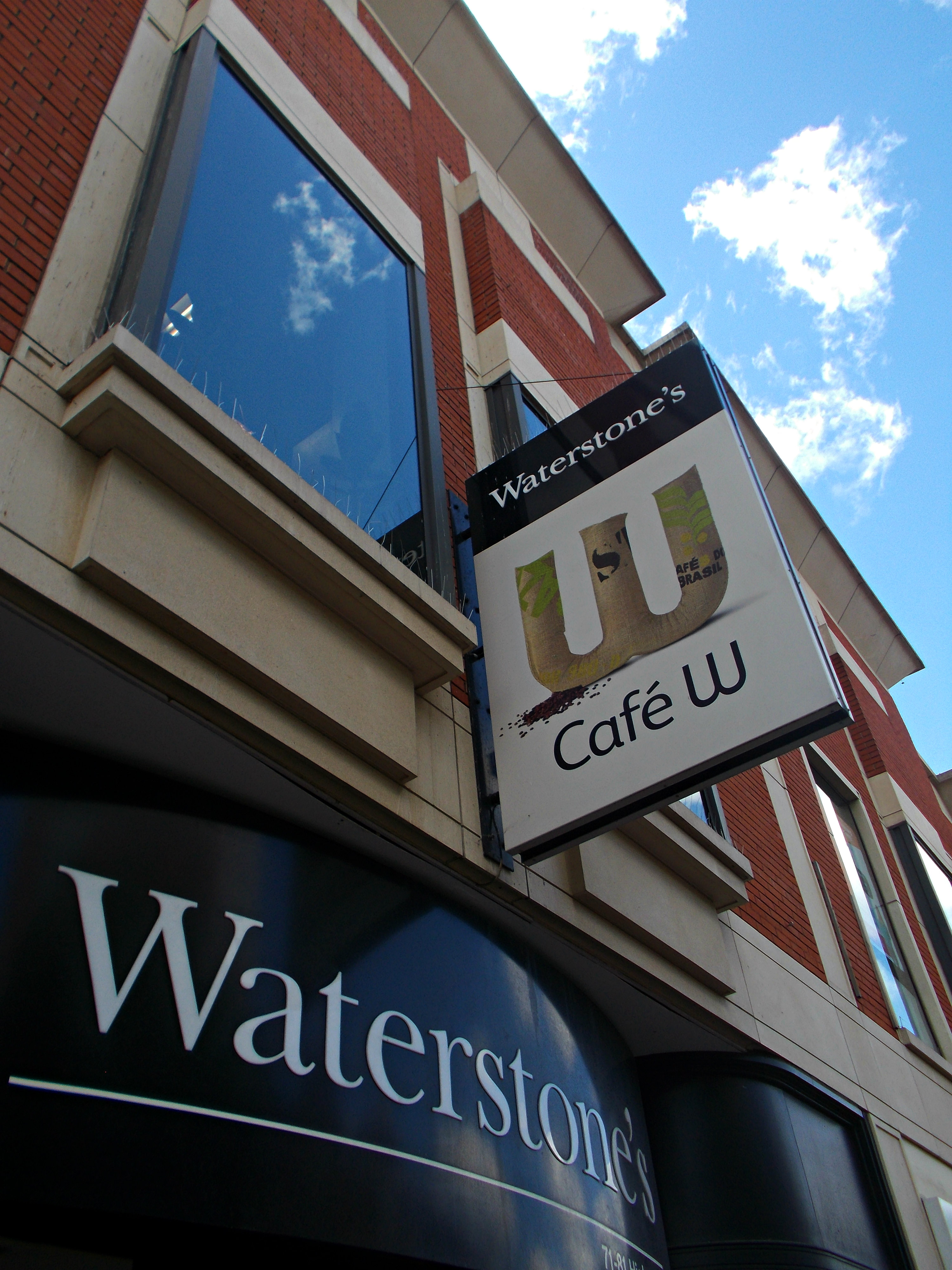
Sutton branch, with Café W signage

Following a decision in late 2011 to scrap an e-reading offer in-branch, it was announced in May 2012 that Waterstones would be selling the Amazon Kindle across its estate. James Daunt launched the new agreement with Amazon stating that Waterstones would be offering "e-reading services and offer Kindle digital devices" throughout the company's branches and on its website, with an intention to "make the Kindle experience better". This announcement was received with surprise across the book industry as it had been suggested that Waterstones was developing a partnership with Barnes & Noble to launch the Nook in the UK, or that the company was developing its own device, but Daunt "ultimately rejected" other avenues as Waterstones "would have been out of the market" before their implementation.

It was also announced in May 2012 that the company would begin a refurbishment plan, with Mamut "investing tens of millions of pounds" to fund the refit of a planned 100 shops before the end of the year. The plan saw the introduction of wi-fi into shops, reorganisation of shop sections and space dedicated areas for Kindle devices, and a number of own-brand coffee shops called Café W. The Café W brand was trialled in the Sutton branch, with an expressed aim for around 130 shops over a three-year period to be fitted with a café. The announcement also noted the introduction of a "click-and-collect" service.

The Amazon Kindle officially launched in-branch in October 2012 with an "outdoor and press advertising campaign" promoting the launch, with the Kindle Fire and Kindle Paperwhite model going on sale for the first time in the UK along with older models. The Kindles were tailored with Waterstones screensavers, which led to some complaints and customers attempting to return their devices. The release of the Kindle coincided with a relaunch of the company's brand in the same month, pushing the message that the chain was the "nation's leading bookshop" and producing an exclusive anthology, the Waterstones Red Anthology, to help promote the shops.

By the end of 2012, the Waterstones estate had shrunk to 288 shops, with "commercial reasons" given for the closure of branches in Bromsgrove, Stevenage, Watford, Fleet Street, High Holborn and Epsom among others, with staff being redeployed where possible. In 2012, Daunt stated that future expansion was being considered, based on the performance of the company. The accounts for the year to 2012 showed Waterstones, prior- and post-acquisition had made losses of £37.3 million.

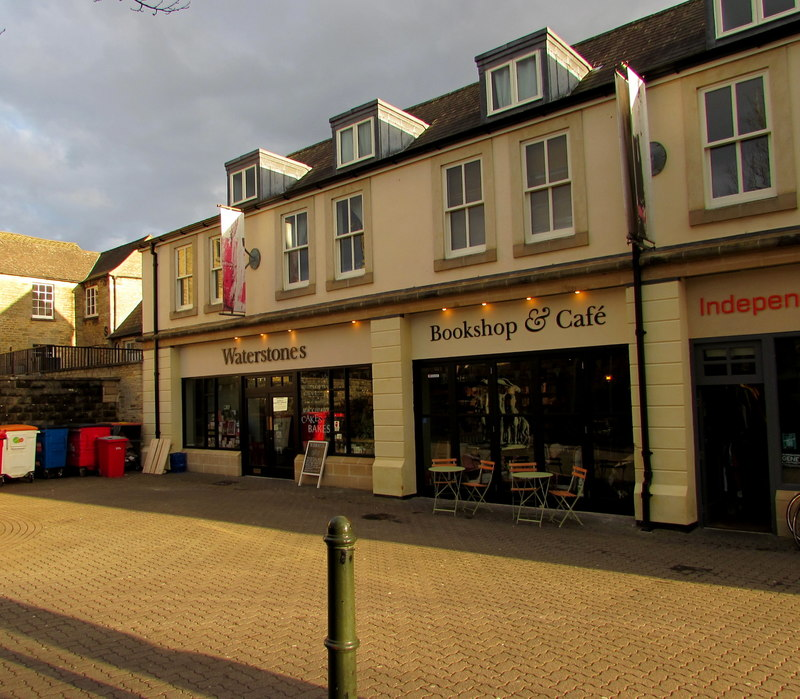
Waterstones Cirencester branch

An overhaul of the company's business strategy started in 2012, with centralised decision-making giving way to shop-based decisions and a renewed emphasis on traditional bookselling techniques. Waterstones embarked on a major restructuring of staffing levels, with a company-wide consultation with 560 managerial staff to subsequently reduce roles within the company. This consultation led to Head Office staff departures and around 200 branch and regional managers leaving their posts. Waterstones launched a number of new partnerships through the year, including with the University of Derby to launch a professional qualification programme for its staff, with the Folio Society to extend customer reach and stock selection in London-based bookshops, and partnering with a new charity, BookTrust. By the end of 2013, Waterstones had cut its losses to £12.2 million, opened 12 further Café W outlets, and embarked on a capital investment in its shop portfolio of £29.5 million.

In 2014, they opened new shops in Ringwood, Blackburn and Southwold, its first branch to be without Waterstones branding, as well as closing shops in Eastleigh and St Neots. Continued business strategy change saw further departures from head office in brand communication and PR and a renewed agency contract for Waterstones' digital marketing with Epiphany. The retailer overhauled its business technology with new algorithms on its website to help personalise the online shopping experience, updated point-of-sale IT and by introducing contactless payment in its shops. The retailer partnered with Airbnb to hold a one-off "sleepover" for customers in its Piccadilly branch in October 2014 after a customer was accidentally trapped in the Trafalgar Square branch after closing. Accounts for 2014 saw operating income losses narrow to £3.8 million, but sales slip by 5.9%.

The ongoing strategic changes made to the way the business operates included the decision in October 2015, after three years on sale in shops, to remove the Kindle from its offer following "pitiful" sales and handing the retail space over to books. This was followed, after a failed attempt to buy BlinkBox books from Tesco in January 2015, with Waterstones announcing it had sold its e-book business to Rakuten Kobo Inc. in May 2016, subsequently directing customers who had purchased e-books through the retailer to access their e-books via Kobo's eBook site. This sale represented an exit from the e-book and e-reader market for Waterstones after eight years and multiple platforms.

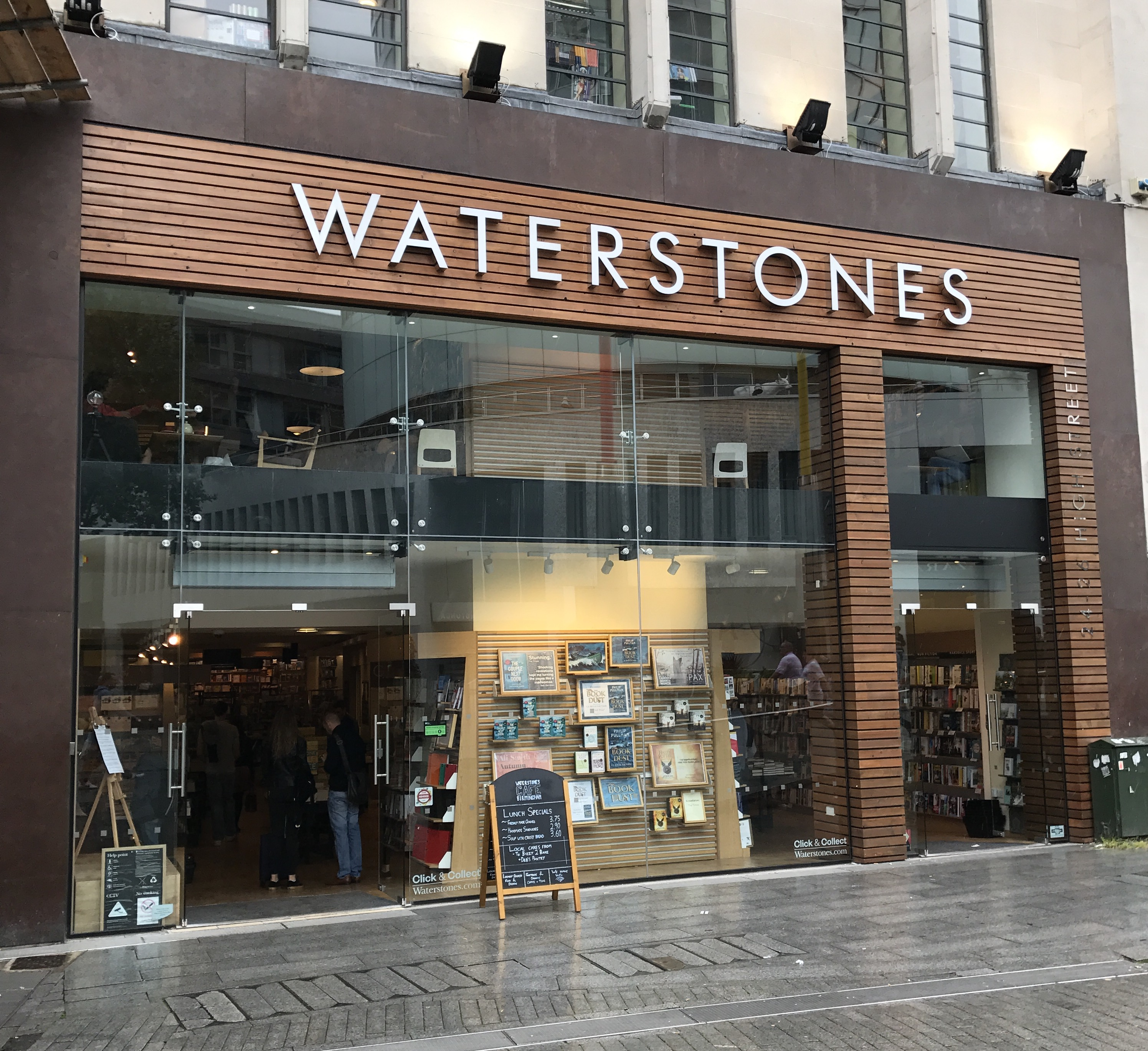
Birmingham branch, with an updated style signage following refurbishment

The company partnered with Oxfam in 2015 to raise £1 million for those impacted by the Syrian civil war crisis through a nationwide campaign called "Buy Books for Syria". Further changes to shops were made in 2015, with the closure of Wimbledon and Birmingham New Street, the opening of The Rye Bookshop and a return to Welwyn Garden City. The company reported an operating income of £5.4 million and a further narrowing of losses to £4.5 million from £18.8 million the previous year.

In a 2016 interview, Daunt stated that Amazon "defines how Waterstones acts"; further, while Waterstones could not compete with the internet retailer digitally, it could offer a credible alternative, believing there was "a future in physical bookselling". Waterstones continued to look at "fixing the basics" during 2016, such as adjusting shop opening hours and harnessing data from the loyalty card as well as the refurbishment of physical shops, including the Canterbury branch, and work on its e-commerce routes through improvements to product ranking. Shops in Oxford Street Plaza, Edinburgh George Street and Reading Oracle were closed, Harpenden Books, Glasgow Fort and Tottenham Court Road were opened and Wimbledon and Watford were reopened in new sites. The newly opened shops benefitted from a refreshed brand look, widely welcomed by the book trade. The retailer renewed its partnership with Oxfam to continue to raise money for the Syrian crisis, donating £5 for each "Book of the Month" sold in-shop during November 2016. Daunt made public his concern that the UK EU referendum was likely to impact on company sales due to an expected retail downturn following a 'no' vote. He later noted that sales had remained "buoyant" following the decision to leave the European Union, but remained pessimistic for the future.

Accounts show that in the year ending April 2016, Waterstones made its first profit in seven years, of £11.7 million. This included increased profits in Ireland, with sales rising 7% over the year, with the company expressing a desire to open more shops in Ireland. The management board was reduced from seven members to three in August 2016, with the departure of Miranda Curtis and a statement that the future composition was under review. Waterstones announced it had raised £300,000 for BookTrust in three years since partnering, and would continue the partnership for a fourth year.

In April 2018, hedge fund Elliott Management Corporation bought a majority stake in the company, leaving Alexander Mamut's Lynwood Investments with a minority holding. The sale completed in early June 2018. Daunt remained as chief executive.

In 2021, an article in The Bookseller reported that Waterstones were planning a collaboration with Next to have Waterstones within some Next shops. In April 2022, a new Waterstones within Next in Martlesham, Ipswich, was announced.

In 2022, Waterstones purchased Blackwell's, the largest independent bookshop chain in the UK, for an undisclosed sum. The acquisition was done under US hedge fund Elliott Investment Management.

== Acquisitions ==
=== Dillons (including Hatchards) ===
Acquired in 1995 by the Thorn EMI group, Dillons was the UK's second-largest bookseller behind Waterstones and was the bookselling arm of EMI's retail division, which included HMV. Dillons had acquired Hatchards. Following the demerger of Thorn and EMI in 1996, the retail arm was divested from the EMI portfolio within a year and spun off into the HMV Media Group, an investment venture between EMI Group and Advent International private equity group. This venture included HMV, Dillons and Waterstones (the latter bought from WHSmith for £300 million), combining to make an international entertainment retailer of more than 500 shops. Following a rebuffed takeover attempt in 1997 of WHSmith, Tim Waterstone became part of the deal and by May 1998, following the £801 million-deal completion became chairman of the group. All Dillons shops were incorporated within the Waterstones brand by 1998.

=== Ottakar's ===
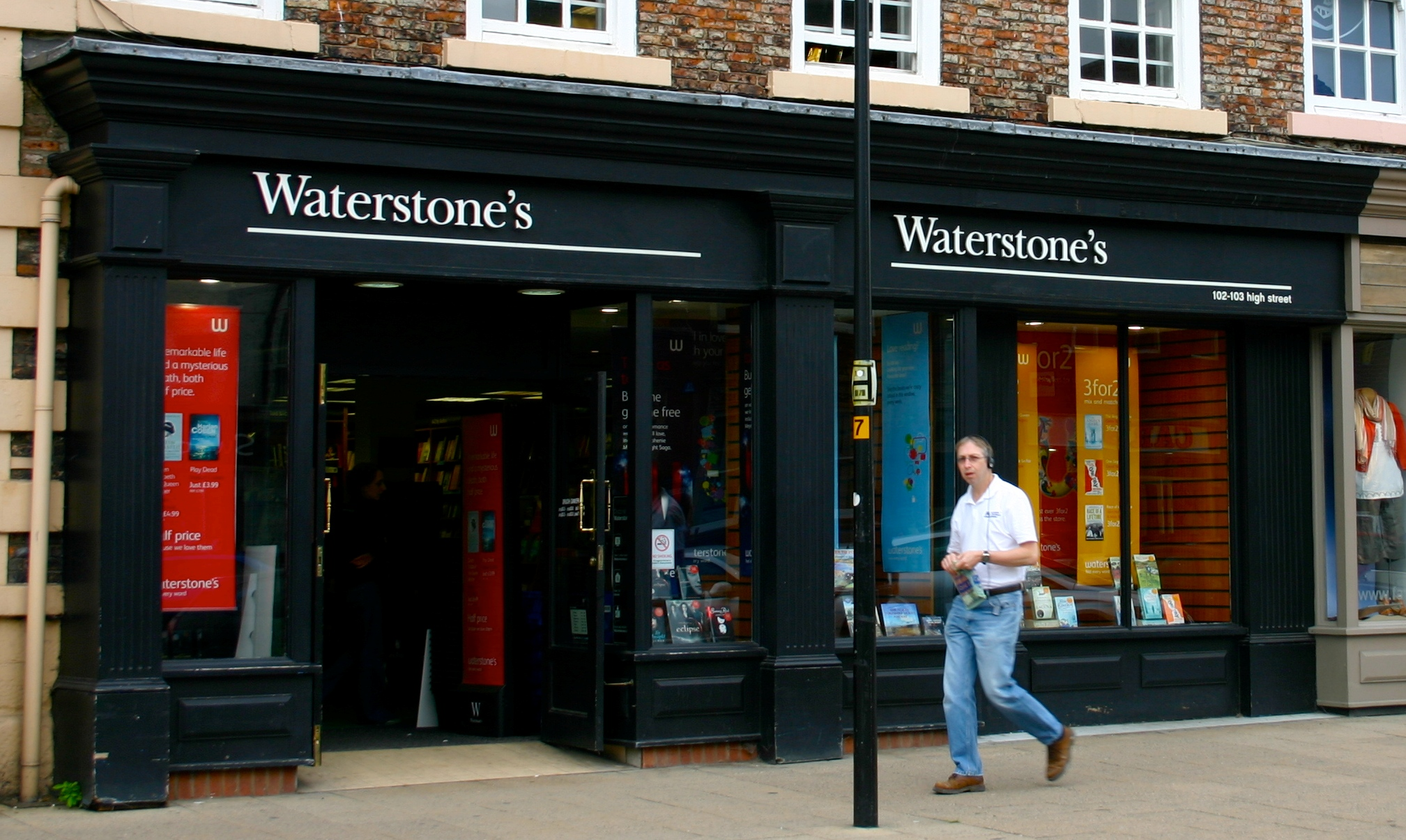
Northallerton branch

In September 2005, HMV Group began attempts to buy rival book chain Ottakar's. This alarmed publishers and authors, who hoped the Office of Fair Trading would refer the takeover bid to the Competition Commission. In March 2006, the Competition Commission cleared Waterstones for takeover of the Ottakar's, stating that the takeover would "not result in a substantial lessening of competition", and is "not likely to affect book prices, range of titles offered or quality of service". Through extensive research, they also found that "contrary to widespread perception, Waterstones, like Ottakar's, operates a book-buying system which mixes central and local input on stock selection."

On 31 May 2006, Waterstones announced that it had successfully negotiated the takeover of Ottakar's. HMV chief executive Alan Giles said: "A combined Waterstones and Ottakar's business will create an exciting, quality bookseller, able to respond better to the increasingly competitive pressures of the retail market." Ottakar's chairman Philip Dunne said: "Over the last year the book market has undergone a significant change with new levels of competition from the supermarkets and online retailers impacting all specialist booksellers and in particular those with insufficient scale to compete on equal terms."

Following the takeover, HMV announced that they would be rebranding every branch of Ottakar's as a Waterstones. In July 2006, a conversion programme was initiated and within four months, every Ottakar's shop had been relaunched as a Waterstones and had seen the loss of 100 jobs.

=== Books Etc ===
In August 2008, the now-defunct Borders chain agreed to sell eight Books Etc. shops to Waterstones for an undisclosed sum. The takeover, which represented 34,000 square feet (3,200 m^{2}) of retail space and incurred no staff losses, increased Waterstones' presence within London to almost 50 shops, "crucially [in] areas that are not represented by Waterstones bookshops". The shops, in Fleet Street, London Wall, Holborn, Wandsworth, Uxbridge, Finchley Road and Canary Wharf, were rebranded and merged into the Waterstones chain by September 2008.

=== Foyles ===
In September 2018, Waterstones confirmed it would buy 115-year-old Foyles, with seven branches, while retaining the brand. James Daunt said the purchase would help "to protect and champion the pleasures of real bookshops in the face of Amazon's siren call".

=== Blackwell's ===
In February 2022, Waterstones acquired Blackwell's for an undisclosed sum.

== Controversies ==
=== Tax ===
Tim Waterstone and James Daunt have been critical of tax avoidance by Amazon in the British press. Amazon has received sustained scrutiny for the amount of its overall sales that are reported by its UK subsidiary, in comparison to those "processed offshore in Luxembourg to avoid UK tax". In the 2012–13 financial year, Amazon paid £3.2 million in tax on sales of £4.2 billion and received £2.5 million in grants from the government. In the same period, it was revealed that Waterstones paid £11.9 million in tax, despite an operating loss of £25.4 million and sales of £410.4 million.

In a report on tax avoidance in the book industry, the magazine Ethical Consumer argued that A&NN Capital Fund Management, Waterstones' parent company in Bermuda, "likely to be for tax avoidance purposes". In response to this, Waterstones issued a clarification on their website reading "As a UK registered and domiciled business, Waterstones fulfils all its tax obligations. This will include both the payment and reporting of all necessary UK taxes, as set out under UK tax legislation." In the 2013–14 financial period, the first full year under A&NN, Waterstones reported sales to Companies House of £398.5 million and an operating loss of £12.2 million.

=== Non-branded shops ===
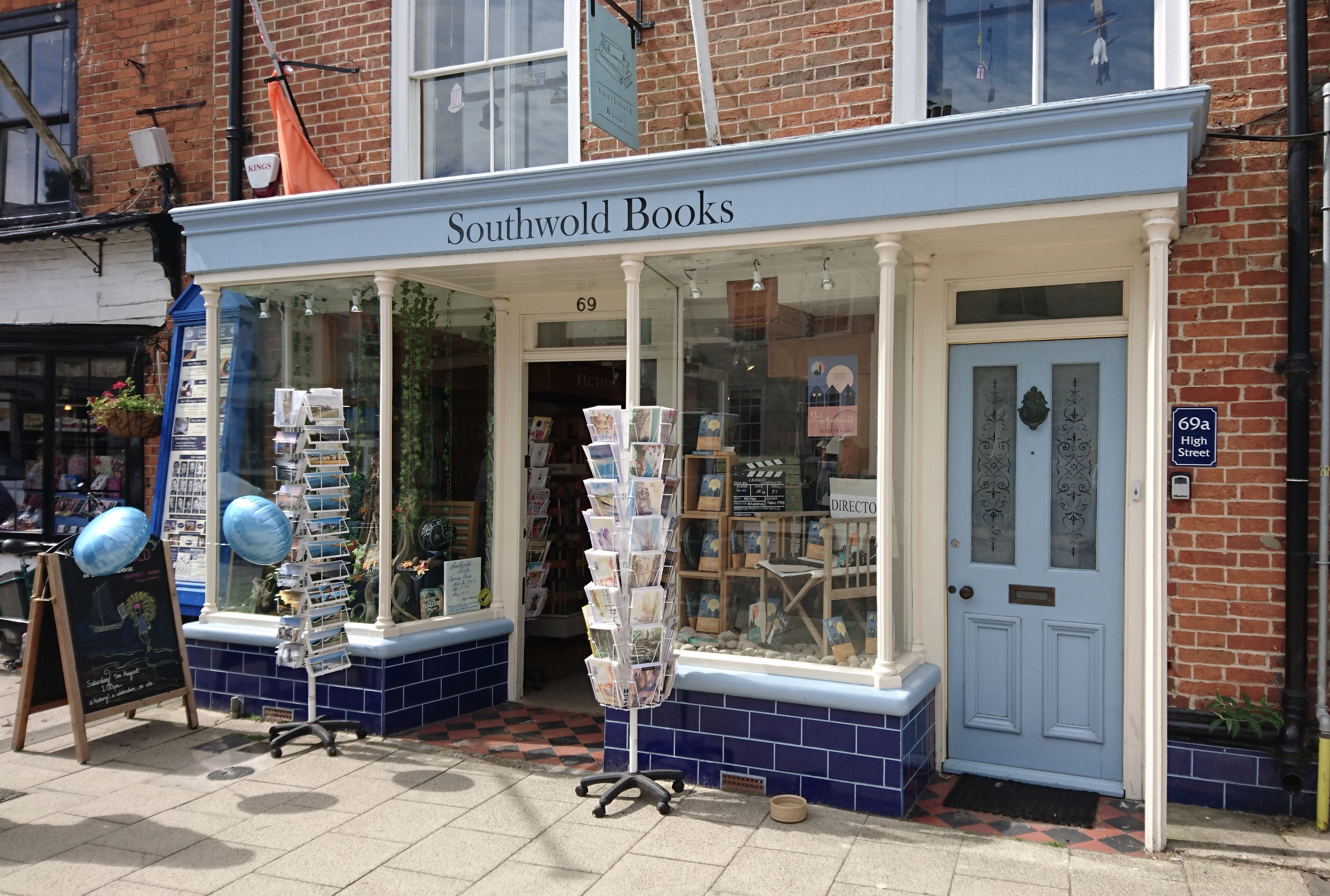
Southwold Books branch

Waterstones opened its first non-branded shop in Southwold, Suffolk in July 2014 called Southwold Books. The company decided not to use its branding as it wished to 'fit in' with the town's high proportion of independent retailers, but this move drew anger from local residents at the time as they viewed the move as "dishonest" and said that local shop rents were being increased because of retail chains moving in and this subsequently was "changing the character of the high street".

Non-branded Waterstones became an issue again in 2016 at a national level, following newspaper reports about not only Southwold Books but two further shops, The Rye Bookshop in Sussex and Harpenden Books in Hertfordshire, being opened and local residents not realising the connection with the retailer. Commentators were split on the ethics of the decision to open unbranded shops, but it was noted that at no point had attempts been made to hide the connection to the retailer. In interviews, James Daunt denied any "subterfuge" and said he wanted for the shops to behave as independent retailers do and have their own identity. He further stated that more unbranded shops were likely to open in the future.

=== Environmental impact ===
Waterstones has worked with the British Safety Council to consider its environmental impact, including factors beyond its carbon footprint. After a 2008 audit, the Council awarded Waterstones three out of a possible five stars for environmental impact.

=== Real living wage ===
As of March 2019, Waterstones does not pay the "real living wage", as recommended by the Living Wage Foundation, and a rate significantly higher than the official National Living Wage. More than 1,300 writers backed a campaign to ask Waterstones to pay the "real living wage". In response Waterstone managing director James Daunt said the company was "simply not profitable enough" and that "there's a long gap between wanting to do something and it being remotely sensible". Waterstones said that only Ikea, Majestic and Lush or other similar large retailers pay the "real living wage".

== Awards ==
Waterstones maintains and supports various literary awards, including the Waterstones Book of the Year, the Waterstones Children's Book Prize, the Waterstones Debut Fiction Prize, Waterstones Irish Book of the Year, the Pushkin House Russian Book Prize, and the Waterstones Children's Laureate, as well as now-defunct awards including the Waterstones 11 and the Guardian First Book Award.

=== Waterstones prizes ===
==== Book of the Year ====
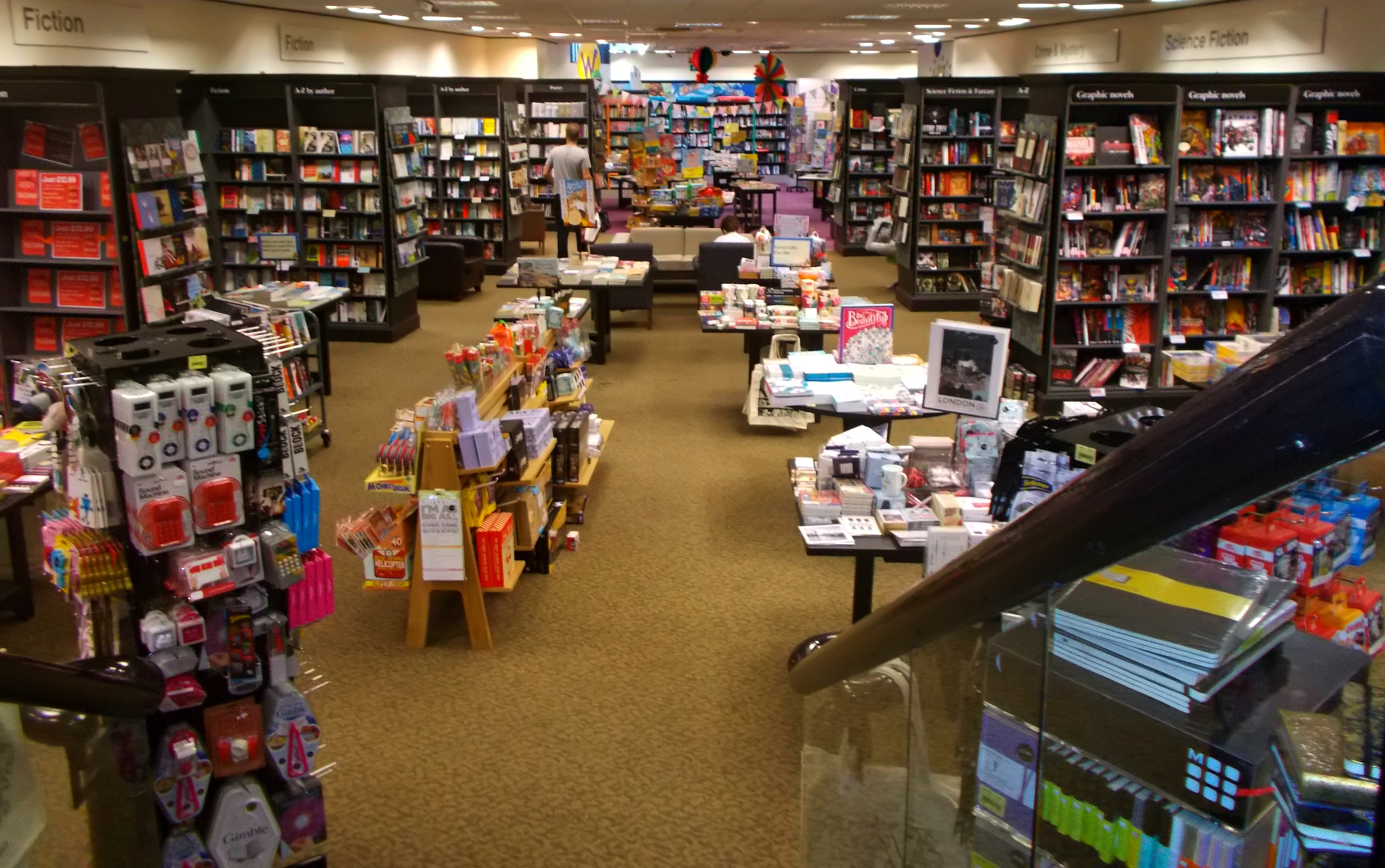
Interior of the Sutton branch

The prize, which has been running since 2012, sees booksellers from across the company select a shortlist of books from any category, published at any time, before the winner is chosen by panel.

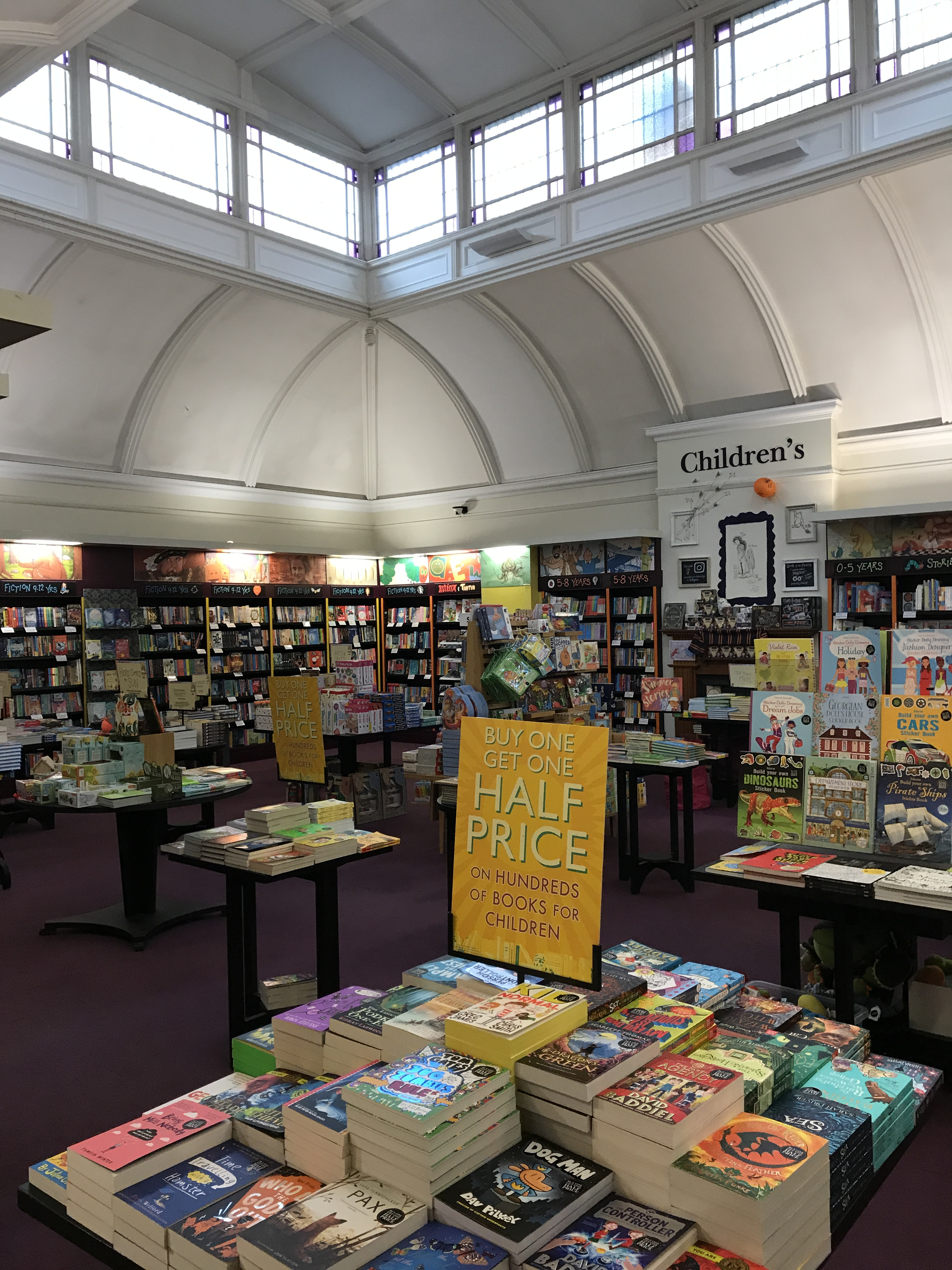
Children's department, Reading Broad St

Waterstones Book of the Year winners
Year	Author	Title	Ref.
2012	Russell Norman	Polpo	
2013	John Williams	Stoner	
2014	Jessie Burton	The Miniaturist	
2015	Coralie Bickford-Smith	The Fox and the Star	
2016	Sarah Perry	The Essex Serpent	
2017	Philip Pullman	La Belle Sauvage: Book of Dust Volume One	
2018	Sally Rooney	Normal People	
2019	Charlie Mackesy	The Boy, the Mole, the Fox and the Horse	
2020	Maggie O'Farrell	Hamnet	
2021	Paul McCartney	The Lyrics	
2022	Katy Hessel	The Story of Art Without Men	
2023	Katherine Rundell	Impossible Creatures	
2024	Asako Yuzuki with Polly Barton (trans.)	Butter	
2025	Lucy Steeds	The Artist	

==== Children's Book Prize ====
Waterstones continued the Ottakar's Children's Book Prize under its own brand and since 2005, the Waterstone's Children's Book Prize has attempted "to uncover hidden talent in children's writing" by awarding authors with no more than two previously published books (adult or children's fiction).

Waterstones Children's Book Prize winners
Year	Author	Title	Ref.
2005	Stuart Hill	The Cry of the Icemark	
2006	Julia Golding	The Diamond of Drury Lane	
2007	Tom Becker	Darkside	
2008	Sally Nicholls	Ways to Live Forever	
2009	Michelle Harrison	13 Treasures	
2010	Katie Davies	The Great Hamster Massacre	
2011	Sita Brahmachari	Artichoke Hearts	
2012	Jonny Duddle	The Pirates Next Door	
2013	Annabel Pitcher	Ketchup Clouds	
2014	Katherine Rundell	Rooftoppers	
2015	Rob Biddulph	Blown Away	
2016	David Solomons	My Brother is a Superhero	
2017	Kiran Milwood	The Girl of Ink and Stars	
2018	Angie Thomas	The Hate U Give	
2019	Onjali Q. Raúf	Boy at the Back of the Class	
2020	Nathan Bryon with Dapo Adeola (illus.)	Look Up!	
2021	Elle McNicoll	A Kind of Spark	
2022	Hannah Gold, illus. by Levi Pinfold	The Last Bear	
2023	Nadia Mikail	The Cats We Meet Along the Way	
2024	Pari Thomson, illus.	Greenwild	
2025	Mikey Please	The Cafe at the Edge of the Woods	

Waterstones is also the main sponsor of The Waterstones Children's Laureate, previously sponsored by Ottakar's. The 2011–2013 role saw the position carry the Waterstones branding for the first time, with the company stating it was 'up weighting [its] activity' and 'supporting the role in shops and online in different ways throughout the year and beyond.' Holders of the role during sponsorship include Julia Donaldson, Malorie Blackman and the current holder, Chris Riddle.

==== Debut Fiction Prize ====
The Waterstones Debut Fiction Prize, established in 2022, is an annual literary award presented to the best debut fiction published in the previous 12 months.

Waterstones Debut Fiction Prize winners
Year	Author	Title	Ref.
2022	Tess Gunty	The Rabbit Hutch	
2023	Alice Winn	In Memoriam	
2024	Ferdia Lennon	Glorious Exploits	
2025	Lucy Steeds	The Artist	

==== Waterstones 11 ====
Set up in 2011, the Waterstones 11 was created to promote debut literary fiction from new authors being published in the year ahead. Books were chosen from a list of 100 submitted by publishers, and were announced in January 2011 with in-shop and online support, as well as a media campaign for the final 11. The inaugural 11 included the Orange Prize winner The Tiger's Wife by Téa Obreht, Man Booker Prize nominee Pigeon English, by Stephen Kelman and the Edinburgh International Book Festival First Book Award winner When God Was a Rabbit by Sarah Winman. The last list was announced in January 2013.

== Locations ==
Waterstones has high-street shops throughout the UK.

Flagship superstores

Its flagship shop on Piccadilly, formerly the Simpsons of Piccadilly department store and notable for its 1930s-Modernist architecture, is the largest shop in the Waterstones estate and claimed to be the largest bookshop in Europe. The main academic branch, formerly the flagship shop of Dillons, is located on Gower Street, between University College London and the Student Central, and promoted as Europe's largest academic bookshop. Aside from these branches, Waterstones operates a number of large shops which are set over multiple floors. Waterstones refers to these shops as 'superstores':

- Piccadilly, London (formerly Simpsons of Piccadilly) – flagship branch with six floors and an estimated 8 1/2 miles of shelving. In 2012, the head office of the company was moved to the shop.
- Gower Street, London – academic branch with five floors and five miles of shelving
- Sidney Street, Cambridge – set over four floors, and containing two cafes.
- Albion Street, Leeds – set over three floors
- College Lane, Liverpool – two floors, including the largest open-plan floor of books in Europe
- Deansgate, Manchester – three floors, with over 100,000 books in stock
- Milsom Street, Bath – three floors, with over 55,000 books in stock
- La Scala Cinema, Sauchiehall Street, Glasgow – five floors, set in a former cinema
- Bridlesmith Gate, Nottingham – five floors

Shops of architectural and historical interest

- Hodges Figgis, Dublin (oldest bookshop in Ireland, founded in 1768)
- Kalverstraat, Amsterdam, designed by Dutch architect Hendrick Petrus Berlage
- Wool Exchange, Bradford
- High Street, Birmingham, formerly Times Furniture Company
- Dolphin & Anchor, West Street, Chichester
- West End Princes Street, Edinburgh
- Corn Exchange, Lincoln
- Emerson Chambers, Newcastle upon Tyne
- William Baker House, Cornmarket St, Oxford
- Fishergate, Preston, formerly Booths grocery and head office
- Broad Street, Reading, formerly Broad Street Independent Chapel
- The Tontines Building, Parliament Row, Stoke-on-Trent
- The Carlton Cinema, Swansea
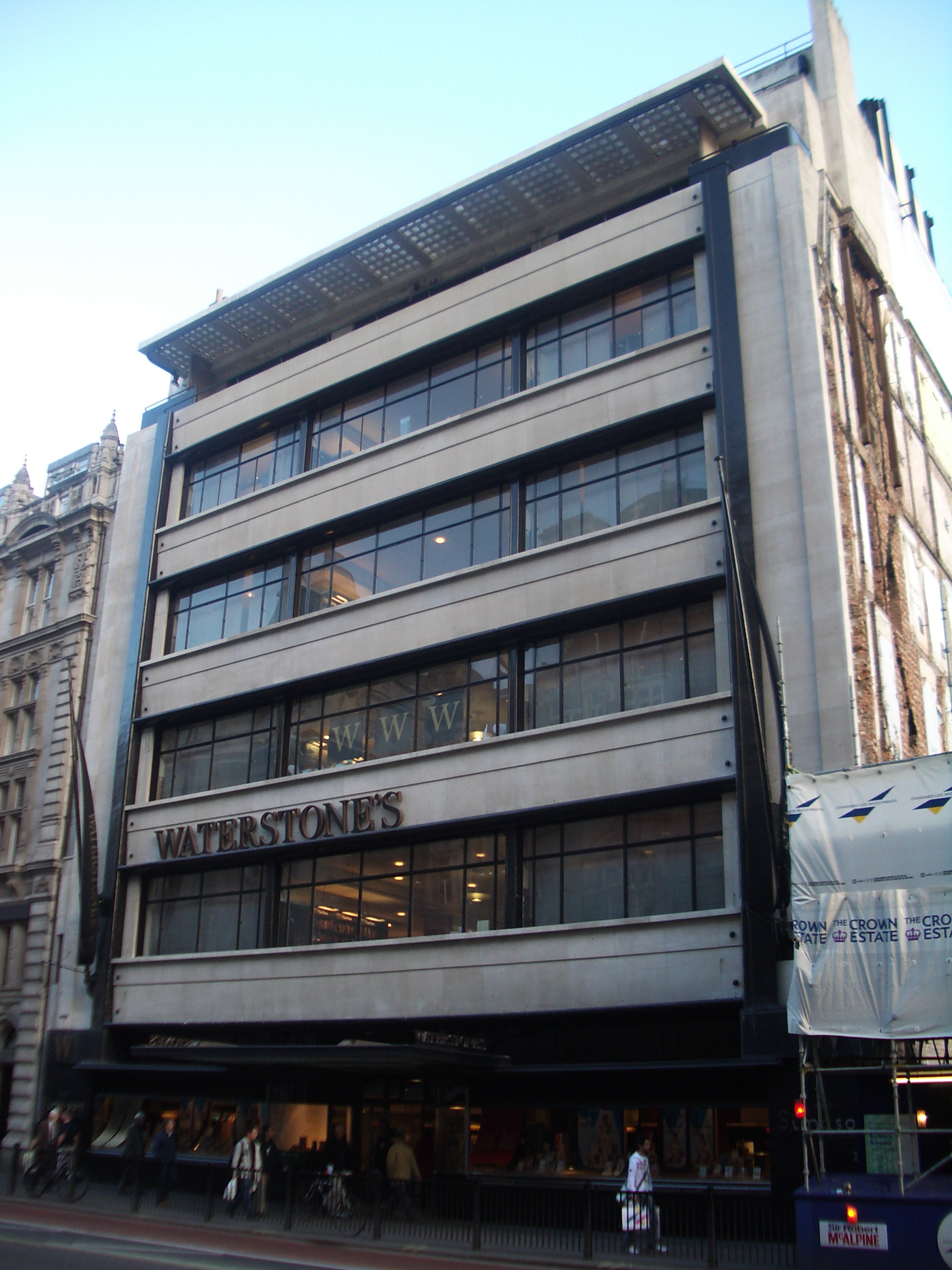
London Piccadilly flagship branch

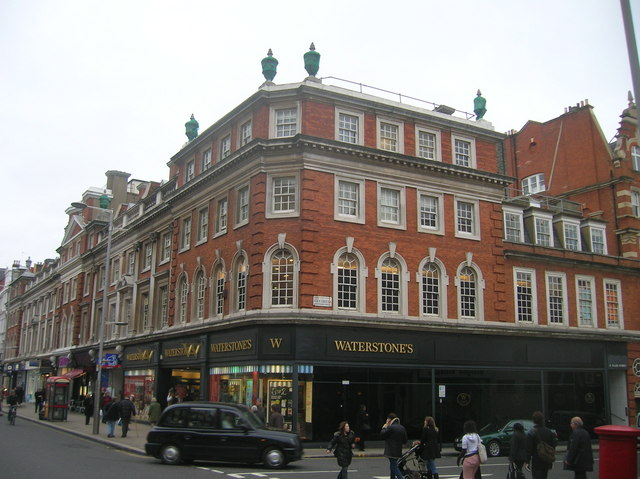
High Street Kensington branch, near the original Old Brompton Road branch

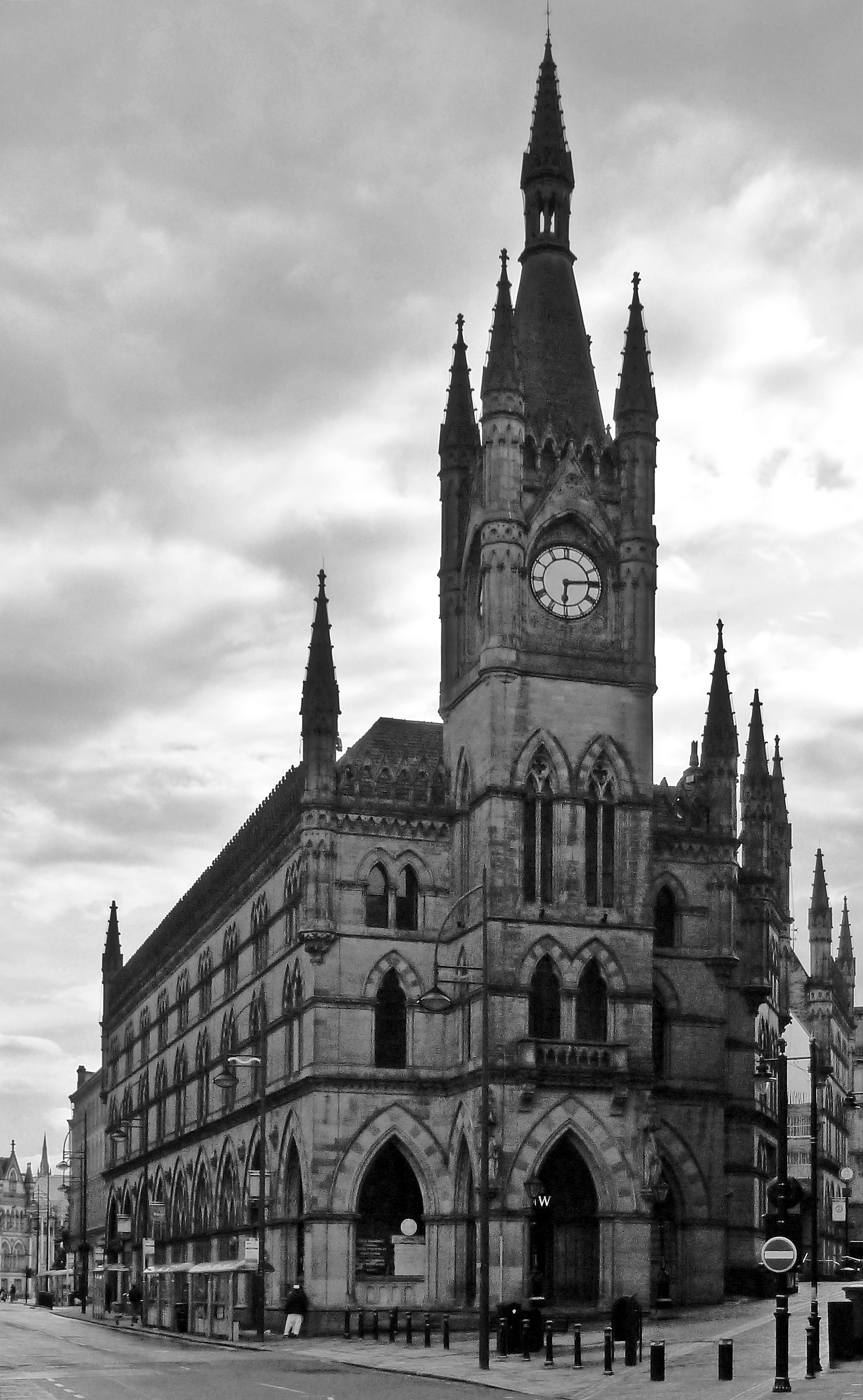
The Wool Exchange in Bradford has been converted into a Waterstones.

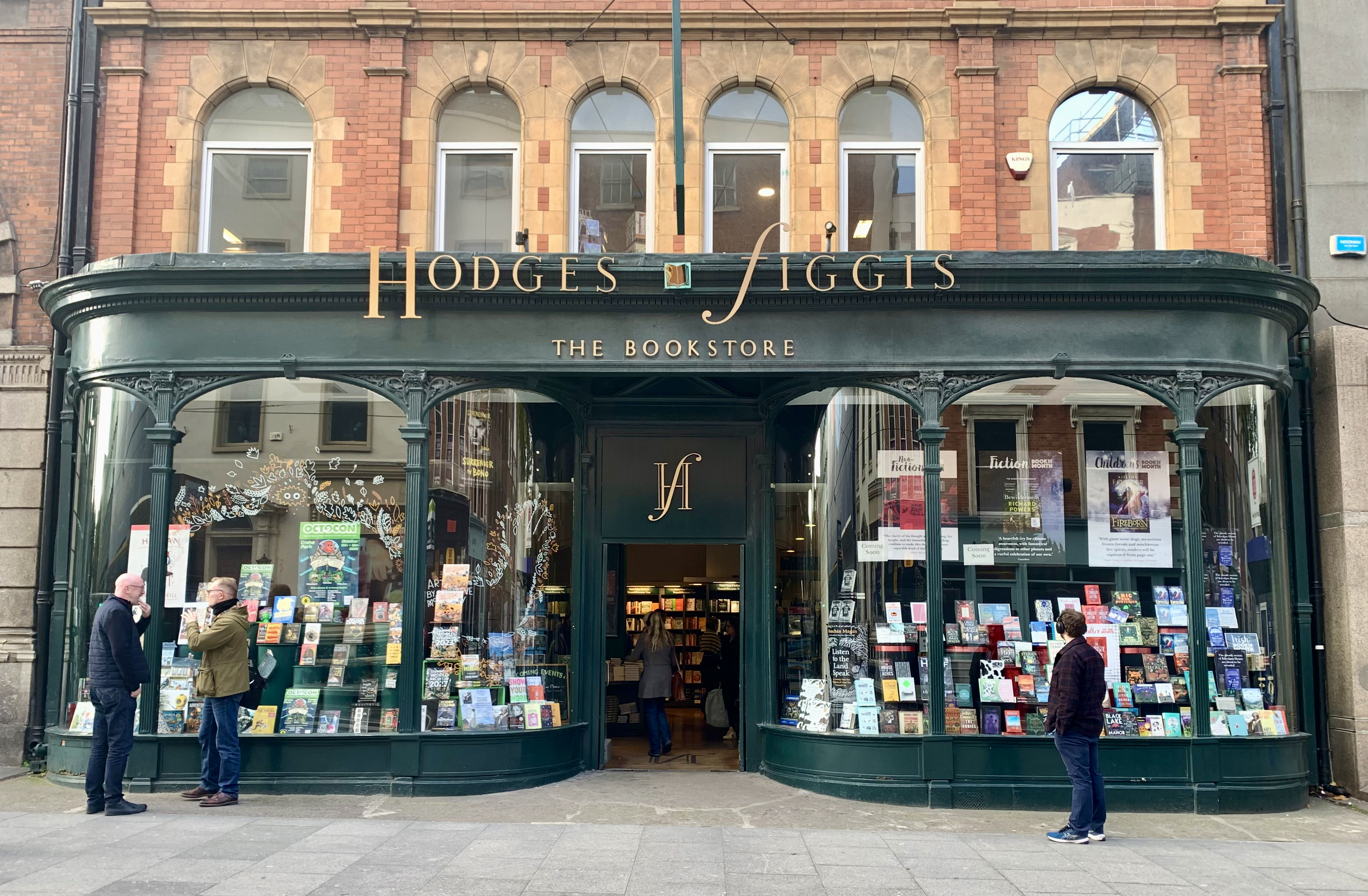
Hodges Figgis, Dublin

== See also ==
- Books in the United Kingdom
- Hatchards
