= Svyaznoy =

- Logo used from 2018 to 2023

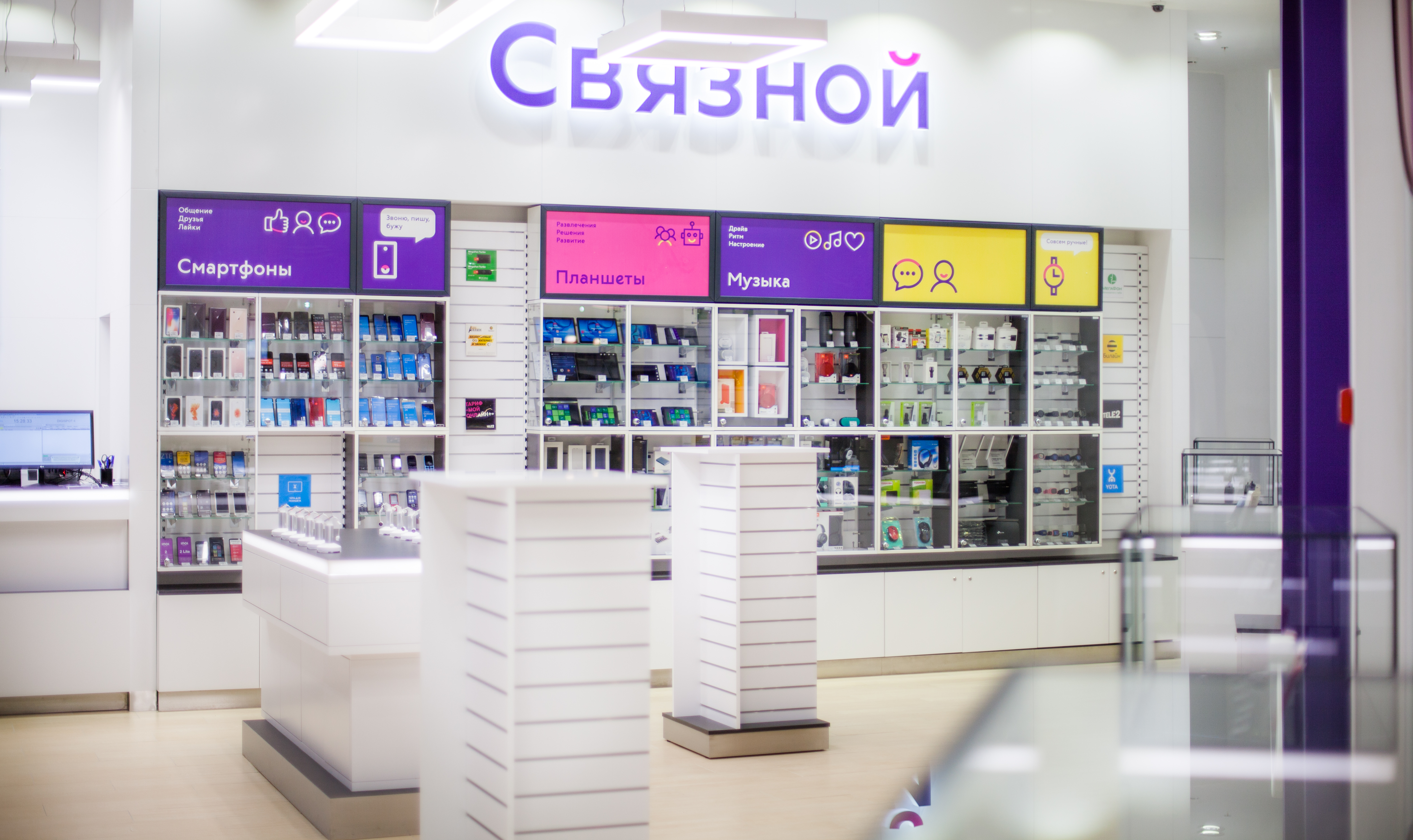
- A Svyaznoy Flex store
- Native name: ООО «Сеть Связной»
- Formerly: Maxus (before 2002)
- Industry: Shopping
- Founded: 1995
- Defunct: 4 August 2023 (closing of the Svyaznoy Plus bonus program) 30 August 2023 (closing of all the latest Svyaznoy stores in Moscow and St. Petersburg) 12 December 2023 (declared bankrupt by the Arbitration Court of Moscow) 16 February 2024 (the official website of Svyaznoy for buyers is closed)
- Headquarters: Moscow, Russia
- Area served: Russia (before 2023-2024); Belarus (before 2021)
- Revenue: 92,927,800,000 Russian ruble (2017)
- Website: svyaznoy.ru, svyaznoy.by

Svyaznoy (Russian: Связной) was Russia's second-largest independent handset retailer, with over 2,900 stores in Russia and Belarus. Its founder and owner is Maksim Nogotkov. As of 2009, the company controls 22,4% of the Russian mobile retail market. Its main rival is Euroset, which Svyaznoy later acquired.

The company was known as Maxus between 1995 and 2002. As of July 2013, Svyaznoy was the only official reseller of iPhones in Russia. Since 2010 Nogotkov has also been developing a banking chain, Svyaznoy Bank.

Svyaznoy company claimed to start bankruptcy process at February 2023. After the start of the Russian invasion of Ukraine, a number of equipment manufacturers stopped deliveries to Russia. The last Svyaznoy stores in St. Petersburg and Moscow closed in August 2023.
