= Euroset =

Russian company retailer

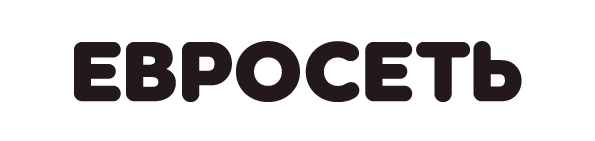
- Native name: Евросеть
- Founded: 1997
- Defunct: 2018
- Revenue: 63,316,700,000 Russian ruble (2017)
- Net income: 1,900,000,000 Russian ruble (2016)

Euroset (Russian: Евросеть) was Russia's largest mobile phone retailer, with over 5,000 stores across Russia and Belarus. In 2006, the company controlled 37% of the Russian mobile retail market and in 2010 it employed some 27,000 people. Its main rival was Svyaznoy.

The company was founded in April 1997 by Timur Artemev and Yevgeny Chichvarkin. After falling foul of the Russian siloviki, Chichvarkin was forced to sell the 100% stake to Alexander Mamut. As of 2012, the mobile network operators OJSC VimpelCom and MegaFon co-own Euroset (each holding a 50% stake). Euroset's major subsidiaries include Ultra and Alt Telecom.

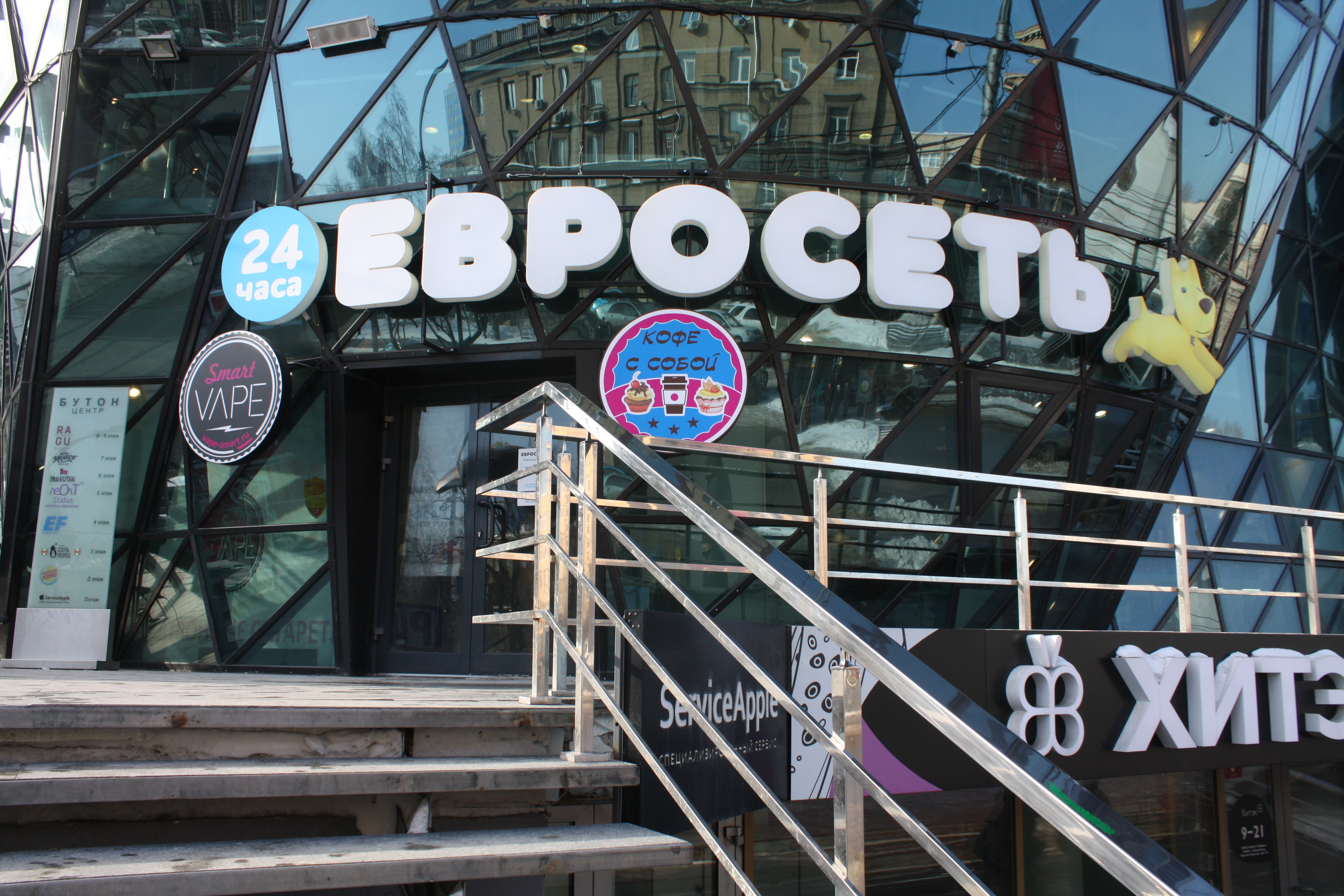
A Euroset store in Novosibirsk, 2017

Entertainer Ivan Okhlobystin was the company's creative director from December 2010 to January 2014. He was sacked in the wake of his controversial appeal to "burn homosexuals alive".

In September 2018 Euroset was purchased by Svyaznoy.
