= Jennifer d'Abo =

British entrepreneur

Jennifer Mary Victoria d'Abo (née Hammond-Maude, 14 August 1945 – 30 April 2003) was a British entrepreneur, best known for turning around the retail chain Ryman in the 1980s, and making stationery "trendy". According to Nicholas Faith writing in The Independent, she was "that rarest of phenomena, a serial female entrepreneur".

== Early life ==
She was born Jennifer Mary Victoria Hammond-Maude on 14 August 1945, the daughter of a diplomat, Major Michael William Vernon Hammond-Maude, and his first wife, Rosamond Patrick. He was the last undisputed Lord of the Manor of Baildon.

== Career ==
After she married her third husband, she started a business career, with a grocery shop in Basingstoke, soon followed by a furniture shop, which sold three years later for a profit of £1 million, and bought a toiletries company.

In 1981, she bought the Ryman stationery shop chain from Ralph Halpern of Burton Group, before selling it in 1987 to Pentos for £20 million, growing the business value by nearly ten times in six years.

The success of her later ventures was more mixed, and she even had a recipe book published, complete with several celebrities contributing, Jennifer d'Abo At Home.

== Personal life ==
In 1963, she married David Morgan-Jones, a Life Guards officer, they had a daughter, Sophie, and later divorced. In 1970, she married Peter Cadbury, they had a son, Joel Cadbury, but divorced in 1976. Peter Cadbury said that the reason was because, "she's a better entrepreneur than me". Her third marriage, to the stockbroker Robin d'Abo, survived until 1987.

She stayed on good terms with all three of her former husbands, and once arranged a dinner with all three, which was a success; and she went on holiday with one ex- and her successor. She was known for her eccentricities, her connections to socialites and her "larger-than-life style", "typified by trademark heart-shaped spectacles".

She died of cancer on April 30, 2003, aged 57.
