= George Josiah Palmer =

English newspaper founder and editor (1828-1892)

- Born: 30 June 1828; Clapham
- Died: 1892 (aged 63–64); Victoria Crescent, Ramsgate
- Education: King's College School

George Josiah Palmer (1828-1892) was the founder and editor of Church Times.

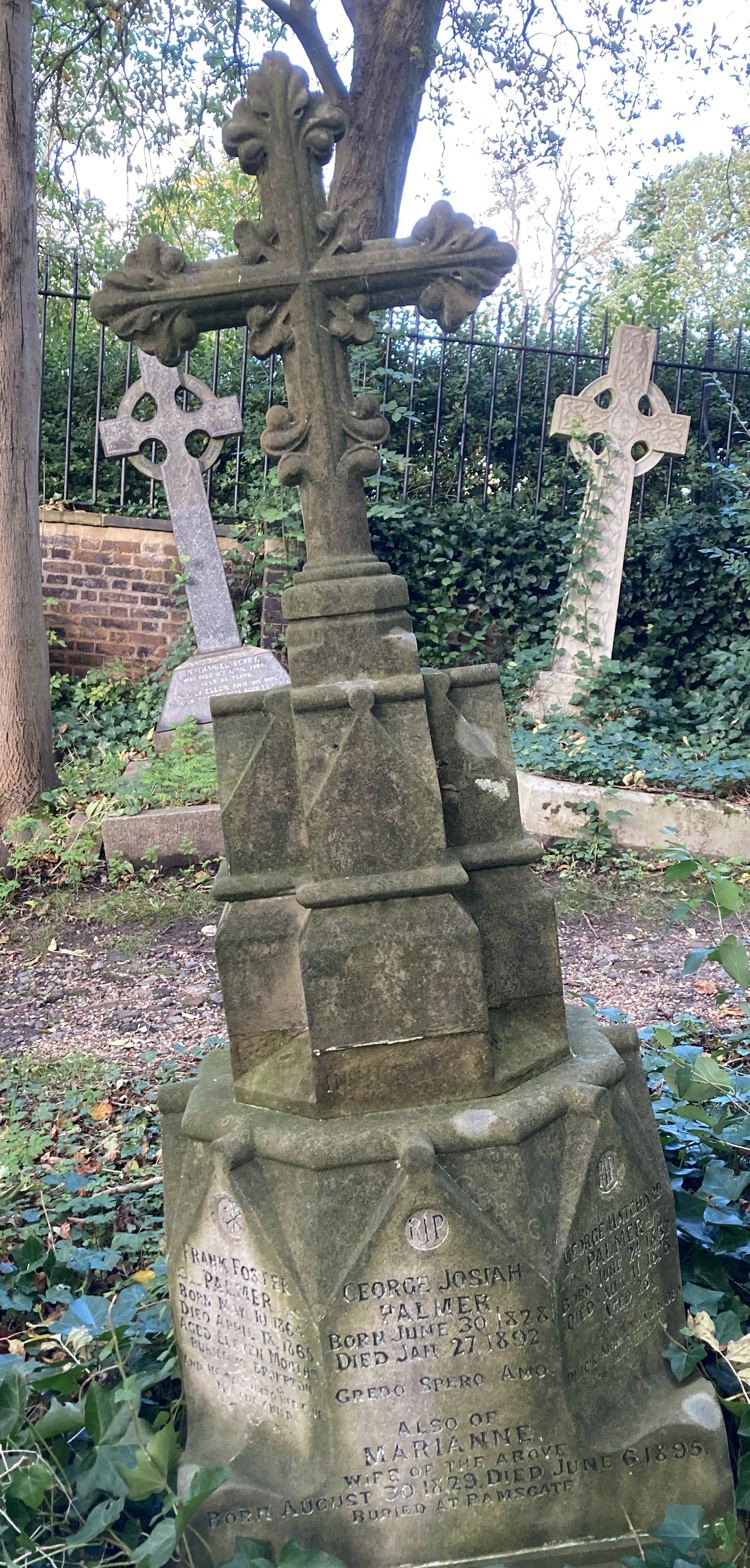
Family grave of George Josiah Palmer in Highgate Cemetery

== Early years ==
Palmer was born on 30 June 1828 in Clapham, then in Surrey, the eldest son of George Josiah Palmer, a printer of Savoy Street, Strand, London, and his wife, Charlotte, who was the daughter of John Hatchard, founder of Hatchards bookshop in Piccadilly. He was educated at Clapham grammar school and King's College School. After his schooling he joined his father's printing firm as a compositor, later becoming a manager.

On 15 May 1851 he married Marianne Beall, the daughter of an upholsterer from Cheshunt, Hertfordshire. They had six sons and a daughter.

== Career ==
The year after his marriage, Palmer acquired a small bookselling and printing business in Bloomsbury, however after eight unprofitable years he had to sell out and move to smaller premises at 32 Little Queen Street, Lincoln's Inn Fields, later to become the home of the Church Times. Palmer's decision to launch a popular church newspaper came after his experience printing and publishing The Union newspaper, a Christian publication which failed in 1862. The first issue of Palmer's Church Times appeared on 7 February 1863. Like The Union it was founded to promote the work and views of the Tractarians, who were then in opposition to the established church. The paper proved successful, soon outselling its Anglican competitor newspapers, and circulation climbed throughout Palmer's lifetime.

As well as managing and publishing the Church Times, Palmer also edited it until his retirement in 1887. The paper remained in the ownership of the family for over a hundred years until its sale in 1989 and three of his sons worked at the paper.

Palmer died on 27 January 1892 at 3 Victoria Crescent, Ramsgate and was buried on the eastern side of Highgate Cemetery.
