= John Hatchard =

English publisher and bookseller (1769–1849)

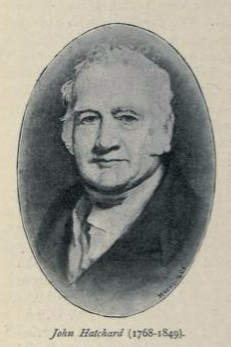
John Hatchard

John Hatchard (1769–1849) was an English publisher and bookseller, in Piccadilly, London. The Hatchards bookshop there is still in business.

== Early life ==
Hatchard had a trial at the works of the printer Thomas Bensley. He then served on apprenticeship, with John Ginger of College Street, Westminster. He later became an assistant to Thomas Payne of Mews Gate, and went into business on his own account taking over the bookshop at 173 Piccadilly, London formerly run by Richard White. where he also became a distributor for the Cheap Repository Tracts. Starting there in 1797, he had the largest business in the retail book trade in London after four years.

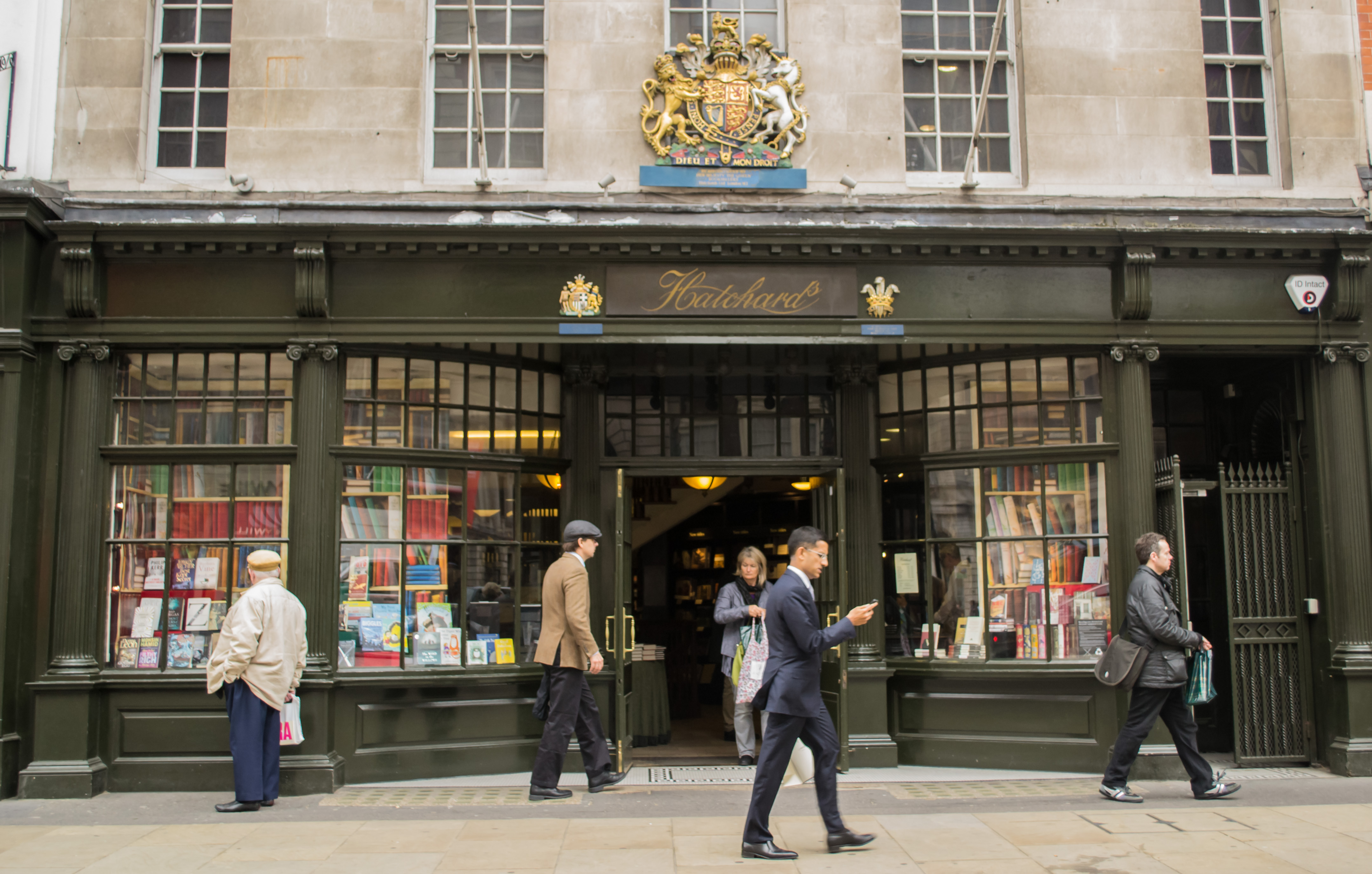
Hatchard's bookshop today

In 1801 Hatchard moved from 173 Piccadilly to No. 189–190; in 1820 that number was changed to 187. The original shop at 173 was demolished in 1810, replaced by the Egyptian Hall.

== Bookseller and publisher ==
The publication of a pamphlet Reform or Ruin: Take your Choice (1797), by John Bowdler in 1797 was the start of a long publishing career. Hatchard's views were conservative and evangelical, and he became the main publisher for works associated with the Clapham Sect. Rivington's, London publishers with a hold on Church of England-related trade, had set their face against the rise of Methodist and evangelical views; Hatchard gained both in terms of publishing work, and also with his shop becoming a social centre. William Connor Sydney wrote:

William Wilberforce, Samuel Rogers, Clayton Mordaunt Cracherode, Sir Walter Scott, Sir John Hawkins, Porson, Steevens, Lord Spencer, Malone, Windham, Hannah More, George Crabbe, were among those who frequented Hatchard's back parlour. Sydney Smith writing in the Edinburgh Review in 1810, described Hatchard's visitors as "a set of well-dressed, prosperous gentlemen, assembling daily at the shop well in with the people in power, delighted with every existing institution and with every existing circumstance."

Hatchard was appointed bookseller to Queen Charlotte and other members of the royal family. He published the Christian Observer from the first number in 1802 to 1845, when he retired from business. He also issued the publications of the Society for Bettering the Condition of the Poor, a venture of William Wilberforce, Sir Thomas Bernard, 3rd Baronet and Edward James Eliot. He was one of the specialist publishers of the "evangelical novel".

== Later life ==
In 1817 Hatchard was taken to court in a libel case, and fined £100. He was publisher of a Report of the African Institution, which contained a story of a whipping of a pregnant slave on Antigua, which was found to be a fabrication. It reflected on the aides of Sir James Leith, the Governor of the Leeward Islands. Hatchard was defended by James Scarlett.

Hatchard died at Clapham Common, 21 June 1849, aged 80. A memorial to Hatchard is located inside St Paul's Church, Clapham

== Family ==
Hatchard married Elizabeth Lambert in 1790. They had two sons and three daughters.

The elder son, John Hatchard, was vicar of St. Andrew's, Plymouth, and the second son, Thomas succeeded as head of the house of Hatchard & Son, booksellers and publishers, 187 Piccadilly. Their daughter Charlotte married the printer George Josiah Palmer, and was mother of George Josiah Palmer (1828–1892) of the Church Times. Of the two other daughters, Sophia married J. R. P. Bright, and Frances died unmarried aged 19, in 1831.

== Notes ==
Attribution

This article incorporates text from a publication now in the public domain: Stephen, Leslie; Lee, Sidney, eds. (1891). "Hatchard, John". Dictionary of National Biography. Vol. 25. London: Smith, Elder & Co.
