= Ryman =

Stationery retail company

Ryman Ltd
- Company type: Private Limited Company
- Industry: Retail
- Founded: London (1893)
- Headquarters: Ryman House, Savoy Road, Crewe, Cheshire, UK
- Number of locations: 197
- Key people: Henry J Ryman (founder); Theo Paphitis (Chairman); Kypros Kyprianou (CEO)
- Products: Stationery, office, printing services and home office supplies
- Revenue: £128.2 million (2016/17)
- Owner: Theo Paphitis
- Website: www.ryman.co.uk

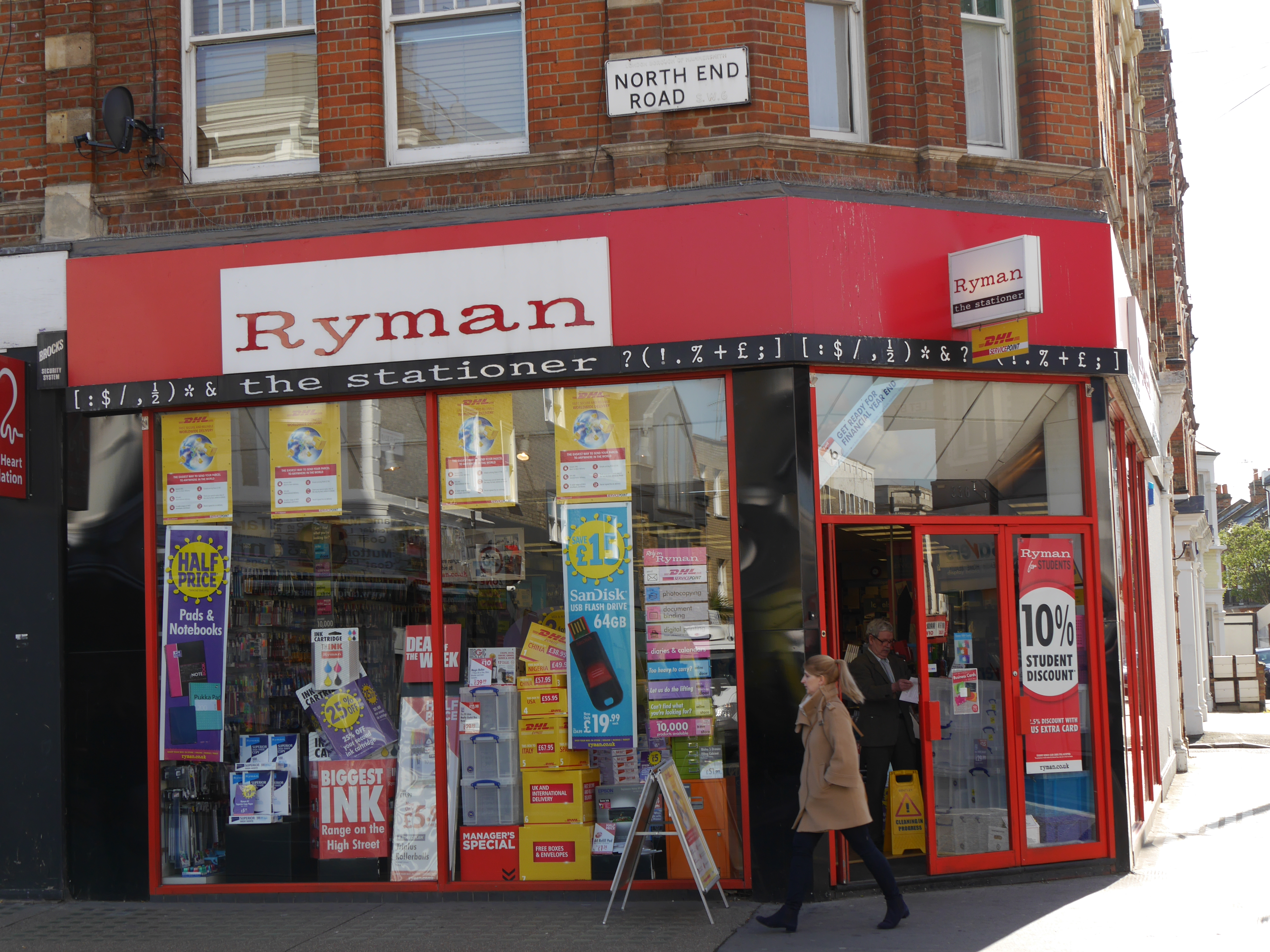
Ryman, North End Road, Fulham, London

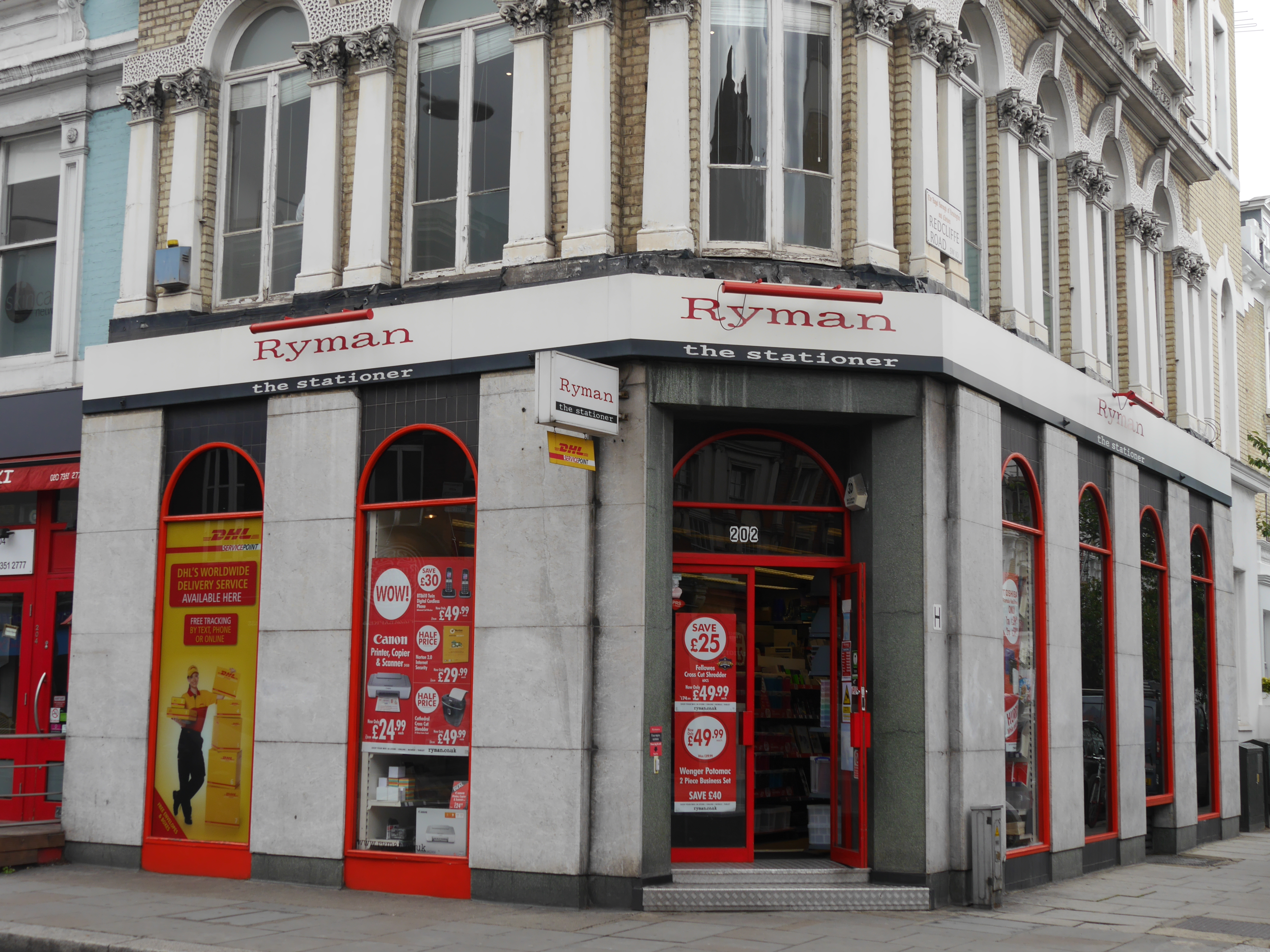
Ryman, Fulham Road, Chelsea, London, 2016

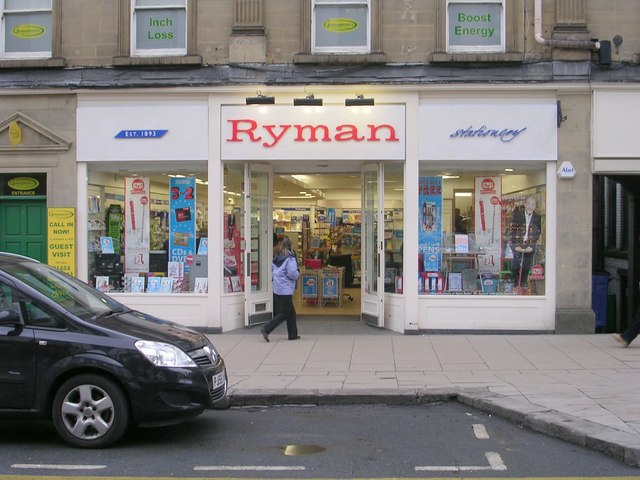
Ryman, New Street, Huddersfield, 2010

Ryman is a stationery retail company with 197 outlets nationwide in the United Kingdom. The website and stores provide a wide range of stationery and office supplies for homes and businesses, with its headquarters in Crewe, Cheshire.

== History ==
=== Formation ===
Henry J Ryman opened his first store as a book printer on Great Portland Street, London in 1893, that is still open today. Quickly changing the focus to selling stationery, the business was successfully owned and managed by the Ryman family for several generations. Jack Ryman succeeded Henry in 1931, until he passed it on to his own sons, Desmond and Nicholas, in 1951. At the time that Desmond and Nicholas assumed control from father, the company comprised eleven shops. Expansion followed, along with the introduction of self-service counters and during their ownership, turnover rose from £250,000 to £16 million. Upon selling the company, Nicholas moved to France to become a vigneron.

From 1912 to 1995, the business traded as H. J. Ryman Limited.

In 1968, Ryman merged with the furniture retailer Habitat to form Ryman Conran. The following year they purchased the business of Lupton Morton, who mostly supplied furniture to offices and corporations but also made pieces by other designers, and in 1970, acquired the retail chain Straker-Bedser.

By 1970, the turnover of the group had doubled since the merger with Habitat. However, Terence Conran was disappointed that Habitat itself had not been expanded, and offered to purchase Habitat from Ryman Conran, along with Conran Associates and the remains of Lupton Morton.

Ryman Conran, who did not highly value the Habitat chain, and apparently thought it was making a loss, agreed to the sale. Ryman Conran retained Habitat's original factory in Thetford along with Conran Design Group.

In 1972, the Ryman brothers sold Ryman Conran to the Burton Group for £8 million. Rodney Fitch bought out Conran Design Group, renaming it Fitch & Company in the same year.

During the 1970s and 1980s the business passed through several different owners, including Jennifer d'Abo, who purchased the chain in 1981 and floated it on the Stock Exchange in 1986, and Pentos (owners of Athena and Dillons Booksellers among others), who took the company private again for £20 million (double the flotation price) in 1987.

After a share suspension, Ryman parent company Pentos collapsed into receivership in March 1995. Despite interest from former owner d'Abo and firm bids from a team of Ryman franchisees, backed by 3i, receivers KPMG struggled to generate interest in the company due to the high rents being paid by the company's high street premises.

=== Theo Paphitis ===
Theo Paphitis had been involved in the Ryman business since 1994, having had NAG Telecom concessions in larger Ryman stores. He developed a relationship with the then marketing director Malcolm Cooke, and this eventually led to Paphitis purchasing Ryman from the receivers in March 1995. The purchase was made through Chancerealm Ltd (which later changed its name to Ryman Group Limited).

In 1996, the Ryman Direct mail order catalogue was introduced, followed by a website in 1998. To build a national chain in the United Kingdom, in September 2001, the group acquired the stationery retailer Partners with 86 stores, and in February 2007, purchased 61 stores of Stationery Box.

The businesses and all stores were combined under a redesigned Ryman brand in October 2008, which presently comprises 210 stores with a turnover of more than £125m. In October 2016, the Theo Paphitis Retail Group purchased specialist stationery retailer London Graphics Centre, which was founded in 1973.

== Products ==
Ryman was the first stationer to introduce the concept of colour to filing, with both cabinets and folders. Today, Ryman Stationery stock a wide range of inkjet cartridges, printers, pens, paper, envelopes, office essentials, filing, presentation materials, diaries and Back to School Supplies.

== Sponsorship ==
Ryman were sponsors of the English football Isthmian League from 1997 to 2017, which was, as of 2017, the longest running sponsorship in the history of football in the United Kingdom.

They were also principal sponsors of the English Football Club, Millwall FC in the 2003-2004 season.

In addition, Ryman also sponsors cricket through the Surrey Championship.

== Charity ==
Ryman is an official partner of Comic Relief, raising over £5million for the charity through the sale of exclusive Comic Relief pens in its shops and online, as well as other fundraising activities.
