= Carmen Dillon =

British art director (1908–2000)

- Born: 25 October 1908; Hendon, London
- Died: 12 April 2000 (aged 91); Hove, East Sussex
- Occupation: Art director
- Years active: 1938 - 1979

Carmen Dillon (25 October 1908 – 12 April 2000) was an English film art director and production designer who won an Oscar for the Olivier version of Hamlet (1948).

== Life ==
Dillon was born in Hendon to Irish-born Joseph Thomas Dillon and his wife Teresa. She was one of six children, for whom their Catholic parents paid to be well educated. Carmen went to the New Hall Convent School in Chelmsford. The elder brother died during World War one, one sister became a nun and another brother emigrated. Carmen and her sisters Teresa and Agnes Dillon (known as Una) were left to fulfil their parent's ambitions for them.

Dillon initially worked as an architect and designer, and was invited to design the cover for the newly formed Electrical Association for Women.

However in 1934 she was invited to join the film industry. This built on her enthusiasm for acting and drawing. She became an art director and production designer, and won an Oscar for Laurence Olivier's 1948 film of Hamlet. It was said that for twenty-five years she was the only woman art director in the British film industry.

None of the three Dillon sisters married, and they spent 42 years together in a large flat in Kensington. Tess Dillon had led the physics department at Queen Elizabeth College. In 1985 Carmen retired to Hove with her sister Una, who had founded Dillons Booksellers. Carmen outlived her sister and died in 2000 with no survivors.

== Selected filmography ==
- Murder in the Family (1938)
- The Claydon Treasure Mystery (1938)
- The Last Barricade (1938)
- Father O'Nine (1938)
- French Without Tears (1940)
- Freedom Radio (1941)
- Quiet Wedding (1941)
- Unpublished Story (1942)
- Secret Mission (1942)
- Talk About Jacqueline (1942)
- The Gentle Sex (1943)
- The Demi-Paradise (1943)
- The Way to the Stars (1945)
- Carnival (1946)
- School for Secrets (1946)
- White Cradle Inn (1947)
- Vice Versa (1948)
- Hamlet (1948)
- Woman Hater (1948)
- Cardboard Cavalier (1949)
- The Rocking Horse Winner (1949)
- The Woman in Question (1950)
- The Reluctant Widow (1950)
- The Browning Version (1951)
- Meet Me Tonight (1952)
- The Importance of Being Earnest (1952)
- The Story of Robin Hood (1952)
- The Sword and the Rose (1953)
- Rob Roy (1953)
- Doctor in the House (1954)
- Simon and Laura (1955)
- One Good Turn (1955)
- Doctor at Sea (1955)
- Richard III (1955)
- The Iron Petticoat (1956)
- Checkpoint (1956)
- The Prince and the Showgirl (1957)
- Miracle in Soho (1957)
- A Tale of Two Cities (1958)
- Sapphire (1959)
- Please Turn Over (1959)
- Carry on Constable (1960)
- Make Mine Mink (1960)
- Watch Your Stern (1960)
- Raising the Wind (1961)
- The Naked Edge (1961)
- Twice Round the Daffodils (1962)
- The Iron Maiden (1962)
- The Battle of the Villa Fiorita (1965)
- A Dandy in Aspic (1968)
- Otley (1969)
- To Catch a Spy (1971)
- The Go-Between (1971)
- Lady Caroline Lamb (1972)
- Bequest to the Nation (1973)
- Julia (1977)
- The Corn Is Green (1979)
