= Hodges Figgis Trophy =

Former Gaelic football competition

All-Ireland Higher Education Gaelic Football Championship
- Irish: Trófaí Hodges Figgis
- Code: Gaelic Football
- Founded: 1976
- Abolished: 1983/84
- Trophy: Hodges Figgis Trophy
- No. of teams: Sigerson Cup Winner v Trench Cup Winner
- Last Title holders: Northern Ireland Polytechnic (now University of Ulster Jordanstown) (th title)
- First winner: National College of Physical Education, Limerick (now University of Limerick)
- Most titles: N.C.P.E./Thomond College Limerick (now University of Limerick) (3 titles)

The Hodges Figgis Trophy was presented to the winner of the All-Ireland Higher Education Senior Gaelic football Championship. The annual match was played between the Sigerson Cup champion and the Trench Cup Champion.

== History ==
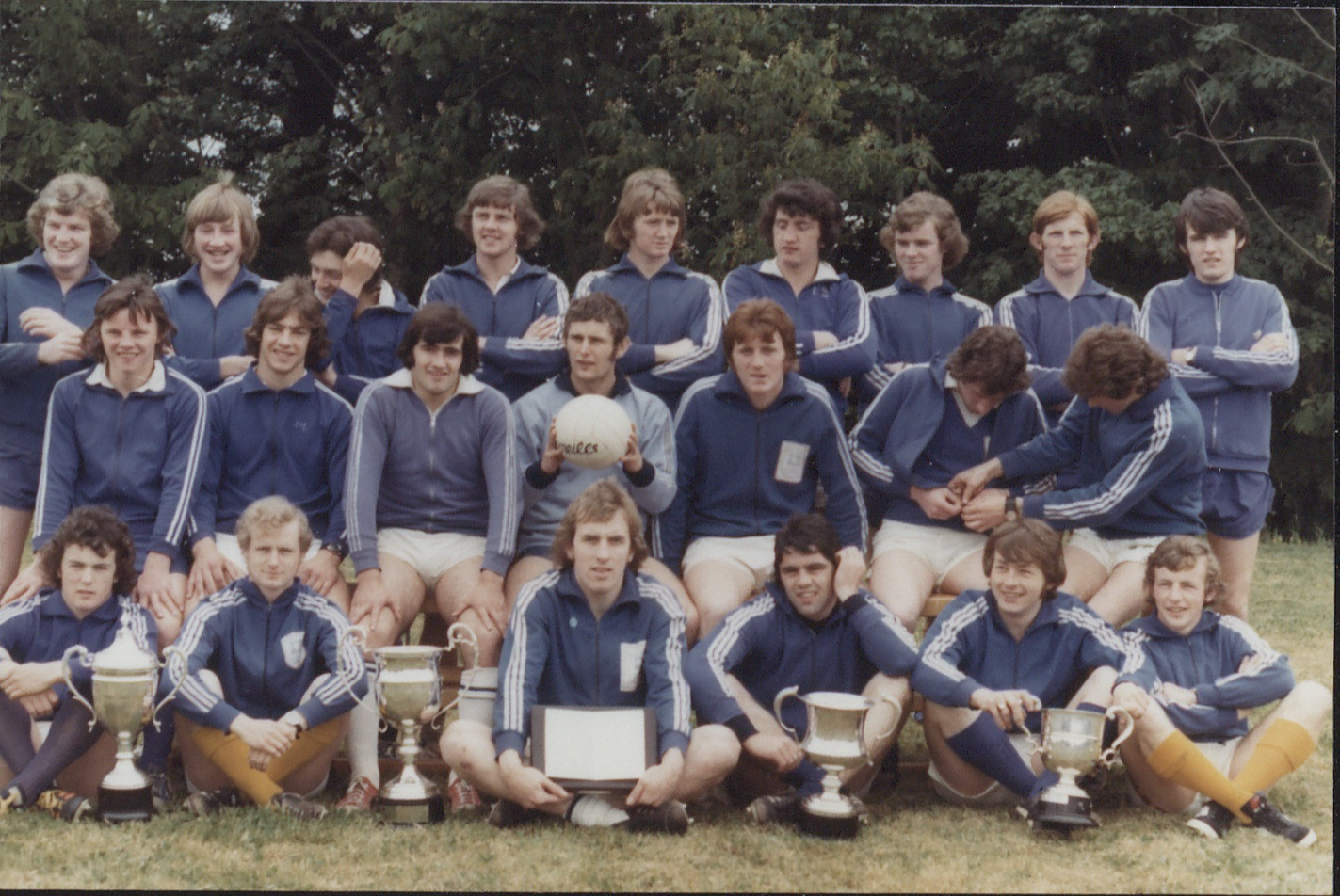
Brian Mullins is holding the Hodges Figgis trophy, a trophy presented by Hodges Figgis book publishers for competition between the Sigerson Cup winners and the Trench Cup winners

The Hodges Figgis Trophy was presented in 1976 to the Comhairle Ard Oideachais (CAO) Cumann Lúthchleas Gael, the Higher Education Council of the Gaelic Athletic Association, by Mr Allen Figgis of the Dublin-based book retailing chain Hodges Figgis. The trophy was a silver replica of an open book, measuring 14 inches by 8 inches, mounted on a wooden base. The trophy was competed for between the winners of the Sigerson Cup and the Trench Cup and marked the culmination of the CAO's programme of Gaelic football championships within Third-Level institutions. It was widely seen among students as a battle between the universities (Sigerson Cup) and the non-university third-level institutions (Trench Cup). The Trench Cup was inaugurated in the 1975–76 season to cater for the third-level colleges which did not compete in the Sigerson Cup championship, inaugurated in 1911. The inaugural Hodges Figgis Cup match took place at Croke Park, Dublin in April 1976 between St Patrick's College, Maynooth (now NUI Maynooth), who beat University College Dublin in the Sigerson Cup final, and the National College of Physical Education, Limerick, who beat Coláiste Phádraig, Drumcondra in the inaugural Trench Cup final. Both teams were star-studded with county GAA players. N.C.P.E. Limerick became the inaugural Hodges Figgis Trophy winners. In 1983 Northern Ireland Polytechnic (now University of Ulster Jordanstown) won their match against University College Galway to lift the Hodges Figgis Trophy. The valuable trophy was lost. With no trophy to play for, the Sigerson v Trench Cup winners series ceased. In 1978 the Hodges Figgis chain of bookshops, long owned by the Figgis family, was acquired for £210,000 by the U.K. bookselling company, Pentos.

== Roll of honour ==
Year	Winners	Cup	Score	Finalists	Cup	Score	Where Played	Date	Referee	County
1983	Northern Ireland Polytechnic	Trench		University College Galway (UCG)	Sigerson		Croke Park, Dublin			
1982	Thomond College	Trench	0-09	Queen's University Belfast	Sigerson	0-06	Parnell Park, Dublin	30 March 1982	M Forde	Dublin
1981	University College Galway (UCG)	Sigerson	1-13	Sligo RTC	Trench	0-06	Dr Hyde Park, Roscommon	3 May 1981		
1980	Northern Ireland Polytechnic	Trench	2-11	University College Galway (UCG)	Sigerson	1-06	Croke Park, Dublin	6 April 1980	K Greene	Dublin
1979	University College Dublin (UCD) v Cork RTC							26 May-6 June 1979?		
1978	University College Dublin (UCD)	Sigerson		St Joseph's TC Belfast	Trench		Knockbridge, County Louth	4 May 1978		
1977	Thomond College, Limerick	Trench	1-12	University College Dublin (UCD)	Sigerson	1-02	Durrow, County Laois	26 April 1977	M. Meally	Kilkenny
1976	National College of Physical Education	Trench	2-16	St Patrick's College, Maynooth	Sigerson	0-05	Croke Park, Dublin	11 April 1976	M. Meally	Kilkenny

== Team sheets ==
Year	Winning team	Finalist Team
1983	Northern Ireland Polytechnic: Eugene Young (Derry), Aidan Browne (Down), Colm Harney (Armagh), D. Durkin, Dominic O'Hanlon (Down), Dominic Corrigan (Fermanagh), Anthony McArdle (Armagh)	University College Galway: James Reidy (Mayo), Seán Twomey, Peter Forde (Mayo), T. McWalter, Jimmy Egan, Tomás Tierney (Galway), Hugh Heskin, Richie Lee (Galway), Michael Brennan, Pádraic "Dandy" Kelly, Brian O'Donnell (Galway), Tommy Carr (Tipperary), Anthony Finnerty, M. Clarke, Páraic Duffy (Mayo)
1982	Thomond College, Limerick: Tommy Doonan (Cavan), Michael McBrearty (Donegal), Brian Ladden (Kerry), Mick Loughnane (Clare), Enda Timoney (Monaghan), Mark Kavanagh (0-01, Laois), Éamonn Quigley (Dublin), Pat Roe (Laois), Tommy Sheehy (Kerry), Pat Critchley (0-01, Laois), Pauric Gallagher (0-04, Donegal), Jimmy Keogh (Dublin), Paul Marron (0-02, Offaly), Séamus Meehan (Donegal), Mick O'Donovan (0-01, Cork), Sub: Brian Looney (Kerry) for Enda Timoney, Aengus Murphy (Galway) for Séamus Meehan [Other panel members: Frank Walsh (Dublin), Declan O'Leary (Cork), Paul Marron (Offaly), Larry Lynam (Offaly), Mick Doyle (Cork), Kevin O'Brien (Cork), Donncha McNeillis (Donegal), Séamus Reilly (Cavan), Eugene O'Riordan (Cork)]	Queen's University Belfast: Paddy Mahon (Down), Joe Ferran (Armagh), Seán Gordon (Armagh), B. Downey (Antrim), Donagh O'Kane(Down), Séamus Boyd (Antrim), L. Keegan, John McAleenan (Down), Seán McAuley (0-02, Antrim), Dermot Dowling (Armagh), Joey Donnelly (Armagh), Aidan Short (Armagh), Brian McErlain (Derry), Éamon Larkin (0-02, Down), Dónal Armstrong (0-01, Antrim), Subs: Seán Leonard (0-01, Fermanagh) for Brian McErlain, Brendan Rafferty for Joey Donnelly
1981	University College Galway: Gay McManus (0-05, Galway), B. O'Connell (0-04), Pádraic Mitchell (1-00, Galway), Michael "Micksey" Clarke (0-02, Westmeath), T.J. Kilgallon (0-01, Mayo), Anthony Finnerty (Mayo), Kieran O'Malley (0-01, Mayo), Ritchie Lee (Galway), Séamus McHugh (Galway), Seán Forde (Galway), Des Bergin (Kildare), Pádraig "Oxie" Moran (Galway)	Sligo RTC: S. Duignan (0-04), Gerry Smith (0-01), Mick McHugh (0-01), Shane Durkin (Sligo), Sean Clarke (Sligo), Jim Watters
1980	Northern Ireland Polytechnic: Pat Doonan (Down), Eamonn McMorrow (Fermanagh), Michael McNally (Cavan), L. McCreesh, James McCartan (Down), Mick Sands (Down), S. Gallagher, Eugene Young (Derry), James Devlin (0-01, Tyrone), J. Gunn, P. Walsh (0-03), Martin McCann (0-04, Down), P.J. O'Hare (1-00, Antrim), Kevin McCabe (1-02, Tyrone), Séamus Fearon (Down), Subs: G. Skelton (Tyrone) for Séamus Fearon, H. McGuirk (0-01, Armagh) for P.J. O'Hare	University College Galway: Gay Mitchell (Galway), Joe Kelly (Galway), C. McCutchen, Seán Liskin (Mayo), J. Costelloe (Mayo), Pádraig Monaghan (Mayo), Séamus McHugh (Galway), Richie Lee (0-02, Galway), T.J. Kilgallon (Mayo), Pádraic Mitchell (Galway), Gay McManus (1-01, Galway), Pat O'Brien (0-01, Mayo), Michael "Micksey" Clarke (0-01, Westmeath), Seán Forde (0-01, Galway), P. O'Riordan, Sub: Tom McHugh (Galway) for Michael "Micksey" Clarke
1979	U.C.D. v Cork RTC	
1978	U.C.D.: Paddy O'Donoghue (Kildare), Mick Carty (Wexford), Pat O'Neill (Dublin), Michael Hickey (Dublin), Gerry McCaul (Dublin), Jackie Walsh (Kerry), Gerry McEntee (Meath), Capt., Mick Hickey (Dublin), Mick Fennelly (Kildare), Vincent O'Connor (Kerry). Mickey "Ned" O'Sullivan (Kerry)	St. Joseph's Training College, Belfast: Liam Austin (Down), Willie McKenna (Tyrone), Peter McGinnity (Fermanagh), Dessie McKenna (Tyrone), Barry Campbell (Tyrone), Phil McElwee, P. Kane, Jim McGuinness (Antrim), Sean McGourity (Antrim), Micky Darragh (Antrim), Dan Morgan, Peter Trainer (Armagh), Phil McElwee
1977	Thomond College: Brian Murtagh (Westmeath), Michael Houston (Donegal), Seán O'Shea (Longford), Eddie Mahon (Meath), Martin Connolly (Mayo), Brian Talty (Galway), Denis O'Boyle (1-00, Mayo), Tony Harkin (Donegal), Michael Spillane (0-02, Kerry), Jimmy Dunne (0-02, Offaly), Richie Bell (0-01, Mayo), Gerry Dillon (0-02, Kerry), Michael Kilcoyne (Westmeath), Pat Spillane (0-04, Kerry), Capt., Johnny O'Connell (0-01, Kerry), Sub: Declan Smyth (Galway) for Michael Kilcoyne	U.C.D.: Ivan Heffernan (Mayo), Dave Billings (Dublin), Bernie Jennings (Mayo), Seán Hunt (Roscommon), P.J. O'Halloran (Meath), Mick Carthy (Wexford), Pat O'Neill (Dublin), Gerry McEntee (Meath), Ogie Moran (Kerry), A. King (Cavan), Tony McManus (Roscommon), J.P. Kean (1-01, Mayo), M. Flannery (Mayo), Ger Griffin (Kerry), Tommy Murphy (0-01, Wicklow)
1976	N.C.P.E.: Tony Owens (Cork), Michael Houston (Donegal), Liam Fardy (Wexford), Eddie Mahon (Meath), Joe Mulligan (Offaly), Hugo Clerkin (Monaghan), Michael Spillane (Kerry), Brian Mullins (1-02, Dublin), Capt., Fran Ryder (Dublin), Declan Smyth (0-03, Galway), Richie Bell (0-03, Mayo), Pat Spillane (1-01, Kerry), Jimmy Dunne (0-01, Offaly), Brian Talty (0-02, Galway), John Tobin (0-04, Galway), Sub: Ger Dillon (Kerry) for John Tobin [Other panel members: Brian Murtagh (Westmeath), Tony Harkin (Donegal), Larry McCarthy (Cork), Martin Connolly (Mayo), Mick Caulfield (Wexford), Dick Dunne (Laois)]	S.P.C., Maynooth: Jack Fitzgerald (Cork), Anthony "Tony" O'Keeffe (Kerry), Dan O'Mahony (Mayo), Capt., Tom Barden (Longford), Liam Kelly (Kerry), Michael McElvaney (Longford), John Clarke (Westmeath), Eamon Whelan (Laois), Patrick Henry (Sligo), Declan Brennan (0-01, Sligo), Martin Nugent (0-01, Offaly), Patrick "Paddy" McGovern (0-01, Cavan), Patrick "Pat" Donnellan (Galway), John McParland (0-01, Down), Peter Burke (0-01, Longford) – Sub: Seán McKeown (Kildare) for Paddy McGovern [Other panel members: L. White (Galway) S. O'Mahony (Sligo), Mick Marren (Sligo), Seán Hegarty (Armagh), F. Murray (Longford)]

== Winning captains ==
Year	Player	College	County
1983	Anthony McArdle	Northern Ireland Polytechnic	Armagh
1982	Brian Ladden Kerry	Thomond College, Limerick	Limerick
1981	Gay McManus	University College Galway	Galway
1980	Kevin McCabe	Northern Ireland Polytechnic	Tyrone
1979			
1978	Gerry McEntee	University College Dublin	Meath
1977	Pat Spillane	Thomond College, Limerick	Kerry
1976	Brian Mullins	National College of Physical Education	Dublin
