= John Broadley Wilson =

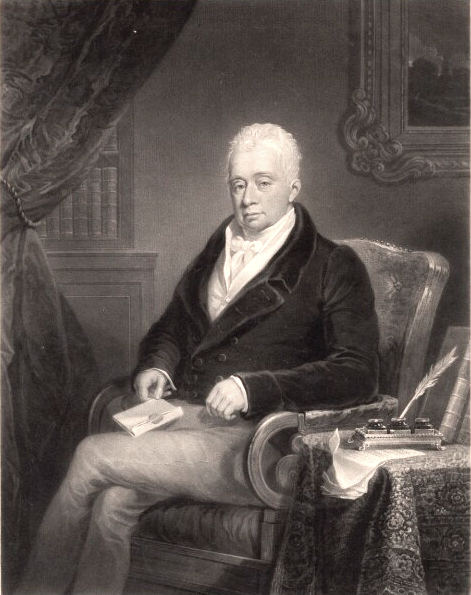
John Broadley Wilson

John Broadley Wilson (1764–1835) was an English dockyard ordnance official. After an adult baptism, he became a philanthropist involved in the finance and governance of a wide range of evangelical Christian societies.

== Background and early life ==
John Broadley Wilson was the son of the philanthropist Francis Wilson (1737/8–1814), of Broadlands (or Park House), Clapham Common; his paternal grandmother was Frances Broadley, third daughter of Thomas Broadley (died 1784) of Kingston upon Hull, and his wife Ann Grundy. Frances Broadley married in 1736 Capt. John Wilson RN (died 1797), as his first wife.

Wilson was therefore great-nephew of Henry Broadley RN of Kingston upon Hull, and cousin once removed of Henry Broadley the younger, Member of Parliament, whose diary mentions Wilson's widow in the 1840s; she was then receiving an annuity from the Broadley family. The elder Henry Broadley died in 1797; he was the brother of Robert Carli(s)le Broadley, a banker in Hull.

Wilson was a protégé of George Townshend, 1st Marquess Townshend, who served as Master-General of the Ordnance in the first part of the 1780s. He had a position in the ordnance department of Plymouth Dock, later known as Devonport. He resigned a commission as second lieutenant in 1791.

Around 1803 Wilson went to hear Isaiah Birt (1758–1837) preach; Birt was a Baptist minister at Plymouth Dock. Brought up in the Church of England, which he did not leave, Wilson underwent a believer's baptism from Birt. In religion he was a Calvinist, and in politics a liberal and admirer of the resistance of George Washington. Birt later dedicated a work on baptism to him. He was a member of the Surrey Chapel Independent congregation of Rowland Hill, at the time of Birt's ministrations, and remained so, the Chapel being at least in name Anglican.

== Supporter of religious societies ==
Ford K. Brown wrote that Wilson "probably made heavier contributions and subscriptions to moral and reforming societies of the day than any other person with the possible exception of Wilberforce. He was involved with 36 societies.

=== Baptist Missionary Society ===
Wilson was Treasurer of the London Baptist Missionary Society from 1826 to 1834. This period covered a major split from the Society of the mission to Bengal based at Serampore in what was then Danish India. The mission broke away from the Society in 1827. Of the original Serampore Trio, William Ward had died in 1823; Joshua Marshman came to the United Kingdom in June 1826. In negotiations that became known at the time as the Serampore controversy, he represented the missionaries.

There are accounts of the negotiations given by John Foster, a supporter of Marshman. The controversy was carried on in public from 1828. By 1831 Samuel Hope (1760–1837), a Liverpool banker and the mission's home treasurer, had offered to act as an arbitrator in the disputed matters. The context was a letter of March 1830 from Marshman, his son John Clark Marshman and William Carey, proposing an arbitration committee of six, naming Hope plus two others to be chosen on their side, and Wilson with two others to act for the Society. John Clark Marshman wrote later that Wilson was thought by the Serampore side "a man devoid of all jesuitism or diplomacy, and in whose justice and impartiality they felt great confidence." On the Council of the Society, Wilson was in a dovish group including also Olinthus Gregory, Joseph Gutteridge (1752–1844), Joseph Ivimey and Benjamin Shaw. On the financial matters in dispute, they took the view that some dependence of missions on the home organisation was to be expected.

Wilson chaired a meeting of the Society's Council in February 1831 objecting to continuing campaigning by the mission's supporters. That year Ivimey published Letters on the Serampore Controversy, dedicated to Wilson and addressed to Christopher Anderson. A comprise solution to the Serampore situation was reached only in 1837, after the deaths of a number of the principal figures.

=== Religious Tract Society ===
Wilson was Treasurer of the Religious Tract Society from 1827 to the end of his life. Interested in reprinting works of the English Reformers in others, he paid for stereotype plates for works published by the Society, and donated those, as well as bequeathing a sum in Consols.

== Benefactor ==
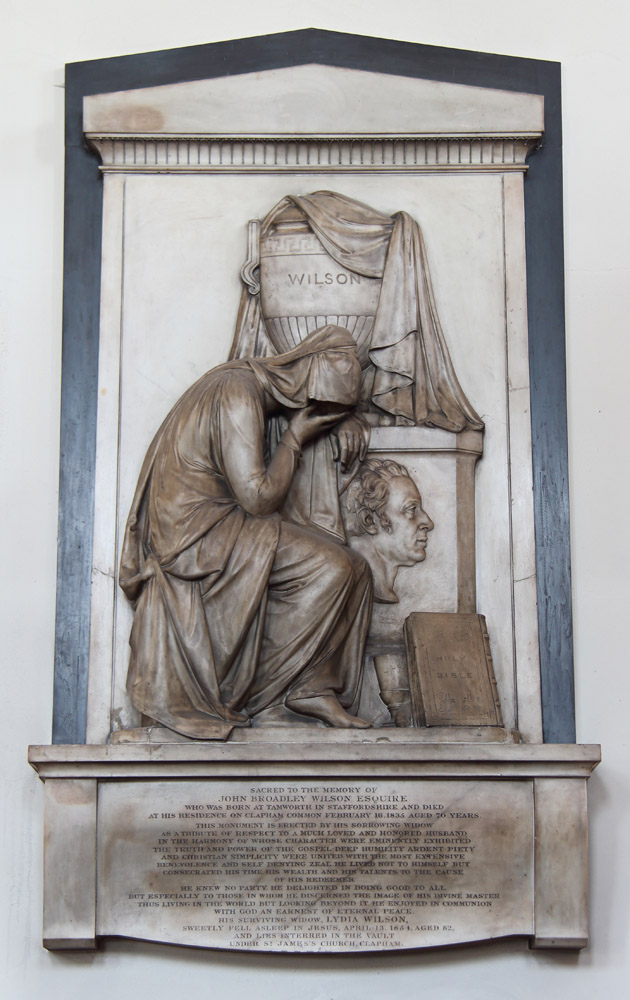
Memorial to John Broadley Wilson at St Paul's Church, Clapham, by Francis Chantrey

Rowland Hill said of Wilson, "I have but one thing to desire—that he may be kept out of heaven a good long time, he is so much wanted on earth." Referring to Wilson, John Angell James wrote:

I knew a Christian philanthropist who set out in life by consecrating a tenth of his income to God. He did this when he had but a hundred a year. He became at length possessed of eight thousand a year, and having no children, he did not then satisfy himself with the tithe, as he had commenced—but spent less than two thousand a year on his own simple and graceful home, and gave all the rest away.

The Baptist minister William Newman (1773–1836) of Stepney College wrote ""Mr Broadley Wilson has a noble, princely mind. His questions are only, Is the object good?—Can it be obtained by effort and perseverance? Difficulties are no objections."

Benefactions included:

- To rebuilding Gawcott Chapel for Thomas Scott (1780–1835)
- To chapel renovation at Torpoint
- To Horton Baptist College, Little Horton
- To the Independent Academy, Idle
- To the Horton Seminary in Nova Scotia
- To Missions of the United Brethren (Moravian Church)
- Bequest to cover the debt of the Baptist Home Mission.
- To the Language Institution of Robert Morrison.
- To London University
- To the Union Street Infirmary, Bishopsgate

The original St Peter's Church at Southborough, Kent, designed by Decimus Burton, had a tablet to Wilson, "the principal projector of the edifice".

== Death ==
Wilson's funeral sermon at St Paul's Chapel, Clapham was preached by the minister there, William Borrows, on 1 March 1835.

== Family ==
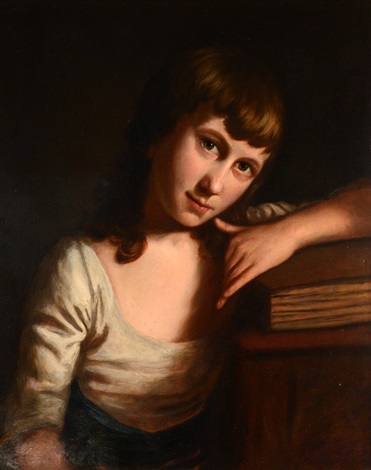
Lydia Gwennap, age about 13, portrait by John Opie

Wilson married Lydia Gwennap (died in 1854) on 22 October 1806, at Stoke Damerel Church. Lydia was the daughter of John Gwennap of Falmouth, Cornwall, and niece of the minister Joseph Gwennap, then of Walworth. The couple were married by the Church of England priest John Martyn Hitchin(g)s, a graduate of Exeter College, Oxford, and curate at Devonport St John the Baptist Chapel.
