= Hatchards =

Bookshop in London, England

Coordinates: 51.5084°N 0.1380°W

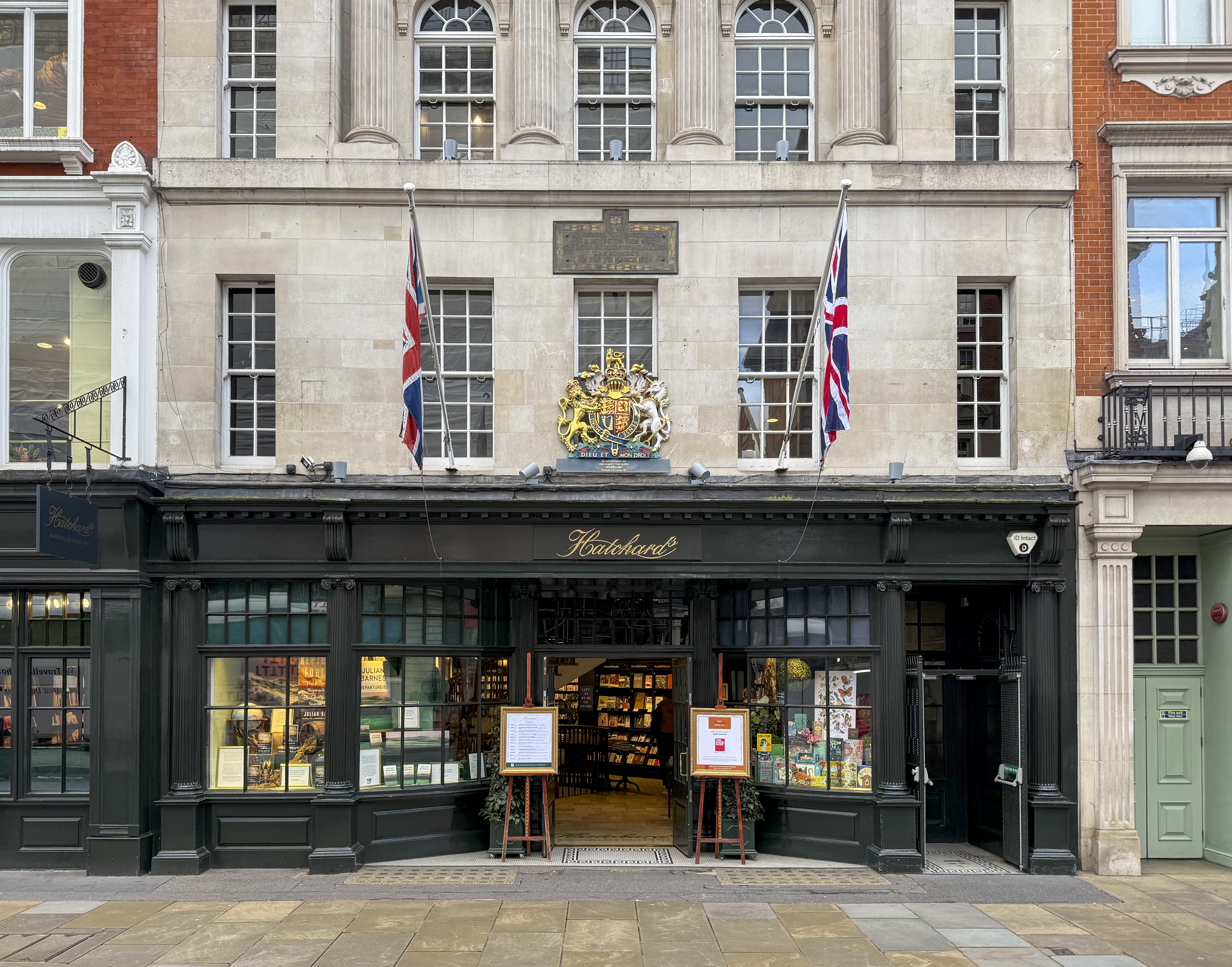
- Hatchards store on Piccadilly in 2026
- Industry: Bookshop
- Founded: 1797
- Founder: John Hatchard
- Headquarters: London, United Kingdom
- Number of locations: 3
- Parent: Waterstones
- Website: www.hatchards.co.uk

Hatchards is an English bookshop claiming to be the oldest in the United Kingdom, founded on Piccadilly in 1797 by John Hatchard. After one move, it has been at the same location on Piccadilly next to Fortnum & Mason since 1801, and the two stores are also neighbours in St Pancras railway station as of 2014. It has a reputation for attracting high-profile authors and holds two royal warrants, granted by King Charles III and Queen Camilla.

== History ==
Claiming to be the oldest bookshop in the United Kingdom, Hatchards was founded at 173 Piccadilly, London, by John Hatchard in 1797. It moved within Piccadilly in 1801, to No.189–190; the site of the first shop was cleared in 1810 for the Egyptian Hall to be built. The second shop had a numbering change to 187, in 1820. It still trades today from the same address, and Hatchard's portrait can be seen on the staircase of the shop.

It was founded with a collection of merchandise bought from Simon Vandenbergh, a bookseller of the 18th century.

In 1939 Hatchards was acquired for £6,000 by convicted fraudster Clarence Hatry, on his release from prison. He turned the ailing business around, and in 1946 he also acquired the T. Werner Laurie Ltd. publishing firm.

Hatchards was acquired by William Collins, Sons in 1956. In the 1980s Hatchards expanded, opening branches across the UK. It was bought by retail holding company Pentos in 1990, and Pentos was later acquired by Waterstones who rebranded all but the flagship store. Waterstones also owns the oldest bookshop in Ireland, Hodges Figgis, which was founded in 1768.

== Operations ==
It has a reputation for attracting high-profile authors and holds three royal warrants. Oscar Wilde's favourite bookshop, the writer signed his books sitting at the ground floor main table—today known as Oscar's table.

Hatchards opened a new branch in St Pancras railway station in 2014. This 2,000-square-foot (190 m^{2}) branch, opened at the beginning of August, was located next door to a new (2013) branch of Fortnum and Mason, continuing a relationship that goes back over two centuries. In August 2019 this location re-opened in a larger space within the station.

A third branch was opened in Cheltenham in September 2022.

== Gallery ==
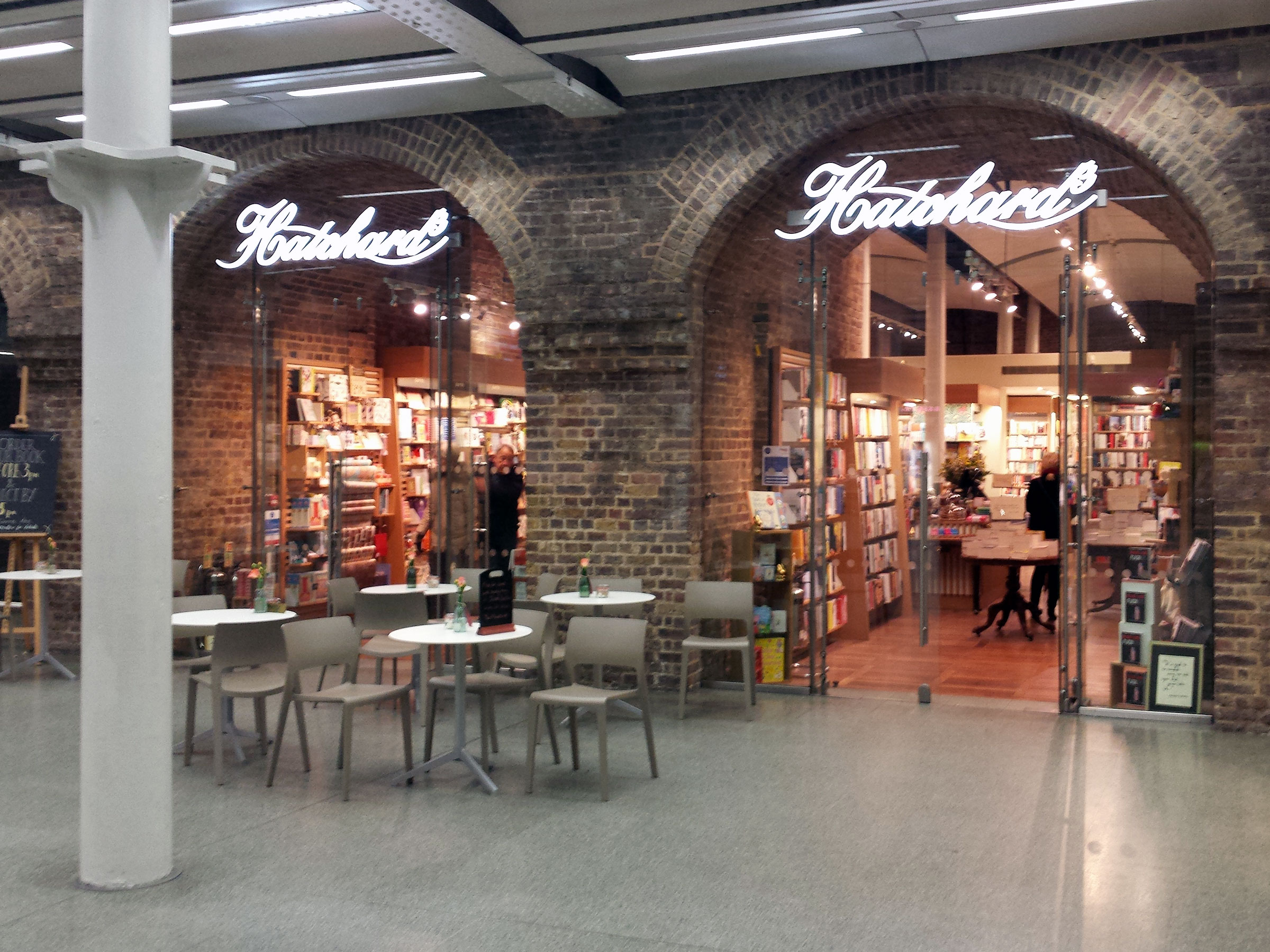
Hatchards at St Pancras railway station

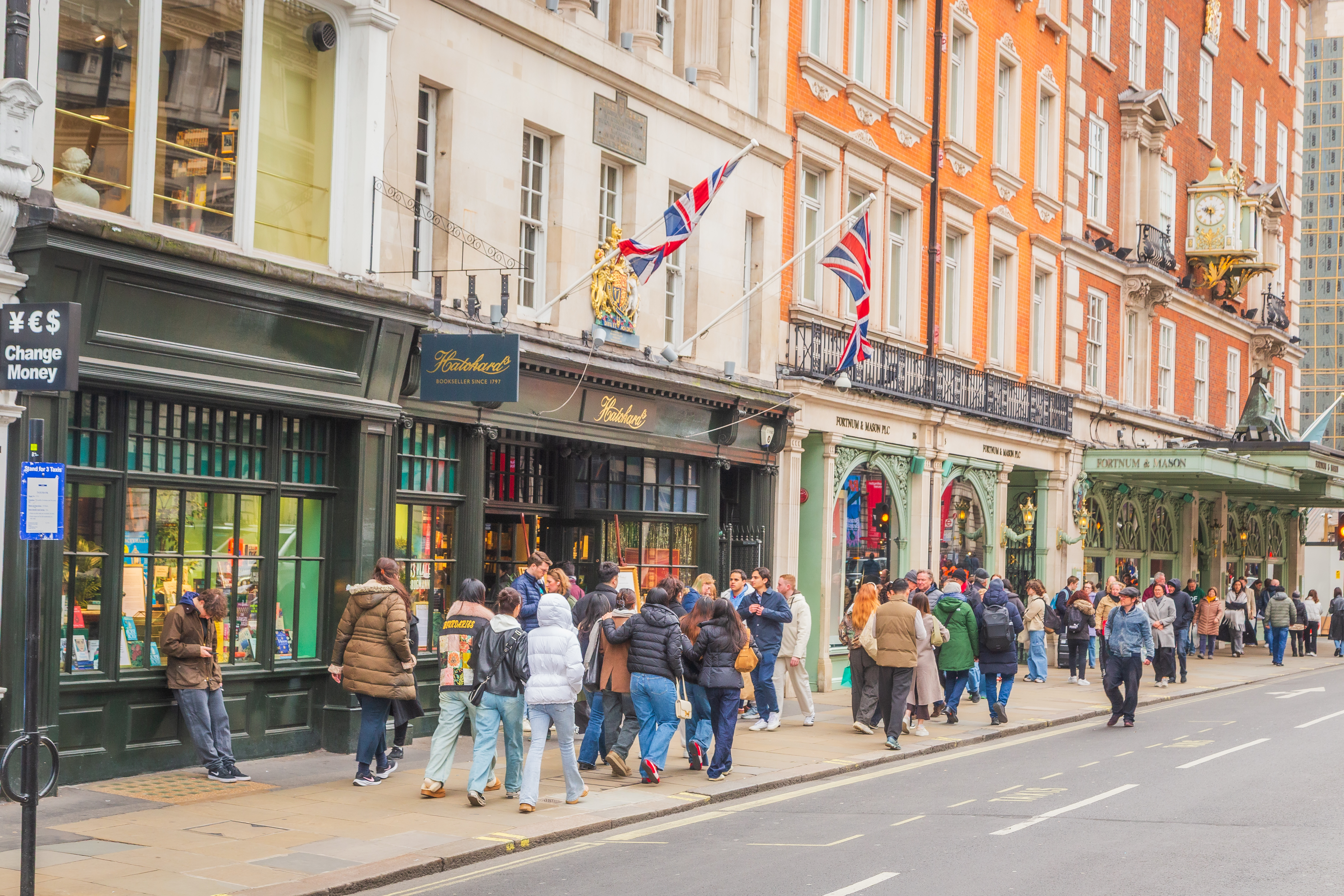
Hatchards Piccadilly next to Fortnum and Mason

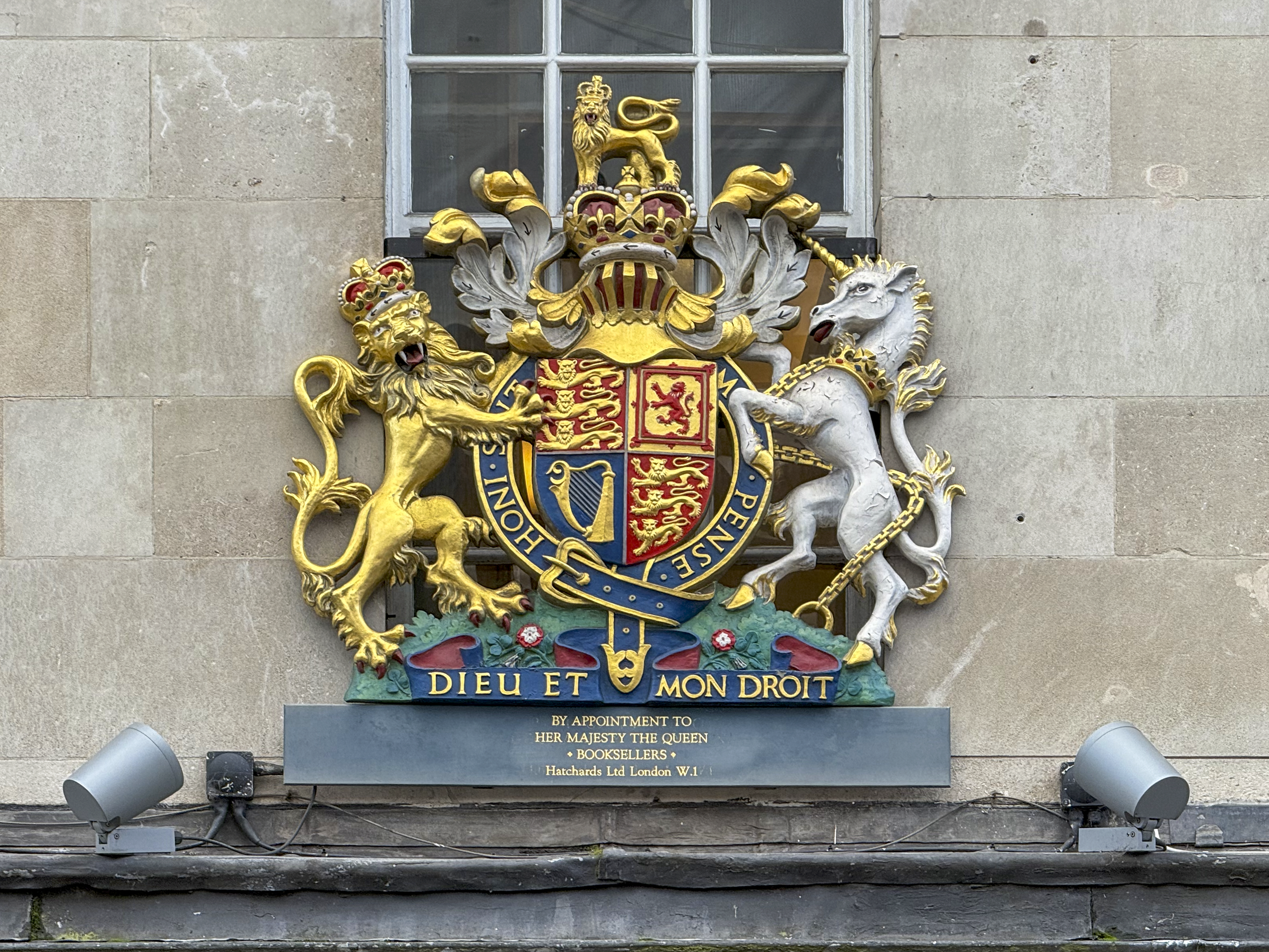
Royal warrant above Hatchards
