= St Augustine's College of Theology =

UK educational organisation

Coordinates: 51.2936°N 0.4115°E

- Former name: South East Institute for Theological Education (SEITE)
- Type: Theological college
- Established: 1994
- Affiliations: University of Durham
- Religious affiliation: Church of England
- Principal: The Revd Dr Alan Gregory
- Location: England
- Campus: Malling Abbey, Kent
- Website: staugustinescollege.ac.uk

St Augustine's College of Theology is a non-residential Anglican theological college in the Southeast of England. Founded in 1994 as the South East Institute for Theological Education (SEITE), the college trains men and women for ordained and lay ministry in the Church of England and other denominations, under the Common Awards programme.

The college is based at St Benedict's Centre in the grounds of Malling Abbey, West Malling, Kent, and also has a teaching centre at Southwark Cathedral, London.

== History ==
In 1959, the Bishop of Southwark had a vision for training Christians to take ministry from the church out into society. In doing so, he broke with the normal pattern of ministerial training in which ministers are taken away from their everyday situations to study theology in a college community. Instead he set up the Southwark Ordination Course which trained people for ministry whilst they remained firmly rooted in their everyday lives and local communities. This way, people learn to make connections between Christian theology and the world in which they live. This vision remains central to the college.

The mode of learning which this course set up has become the model for all such courses in the UK today. In 1977 the Canterbury diocese set up an equivalent course, the Canterbury School of Ministry. SEITE was founded as the merger of these two institutions in partnership with the Methodist and United Reformed churches. The college also now trains people for ministry with the Baptist and Lutheran churches and for reader ministry in the Dioceses of Canterbury, Chichester and Southwark. The college is an ecumenical foundation, drawing together Christians from different denominations.

St Augustine's provides courses in theology for a variety of people in a variety of circumstances. Students come from many different denominations and church traditions, as well as from a variety of social, cultural and ethnic backgrounds. Students come with different academic experiences and abilities, are at different stages in life and bring with them a rich variety of Christian experience. The programmes of ministerial formation are rooted in both good theological learning and practical ministerial experience in local churches.

The college chose a new name in 2016 which refers to St Augustine, the first Archbishop of Canterbury.

== Notable staff ==
- Justine Allain Chapman, Vice Principal from 2007 to 2013.

== Notable alumni ==
=== SEITE ===
- David Chellappa, Bishop of Madras
- Guli Francis-Dehqani, Bishop of Chelmsford
- Sarah Mullally, 106th Archbishop of Canterbury
- Penny Sayer, Archdeacon of Sherborne
