= St Paul's Church, Clapham =

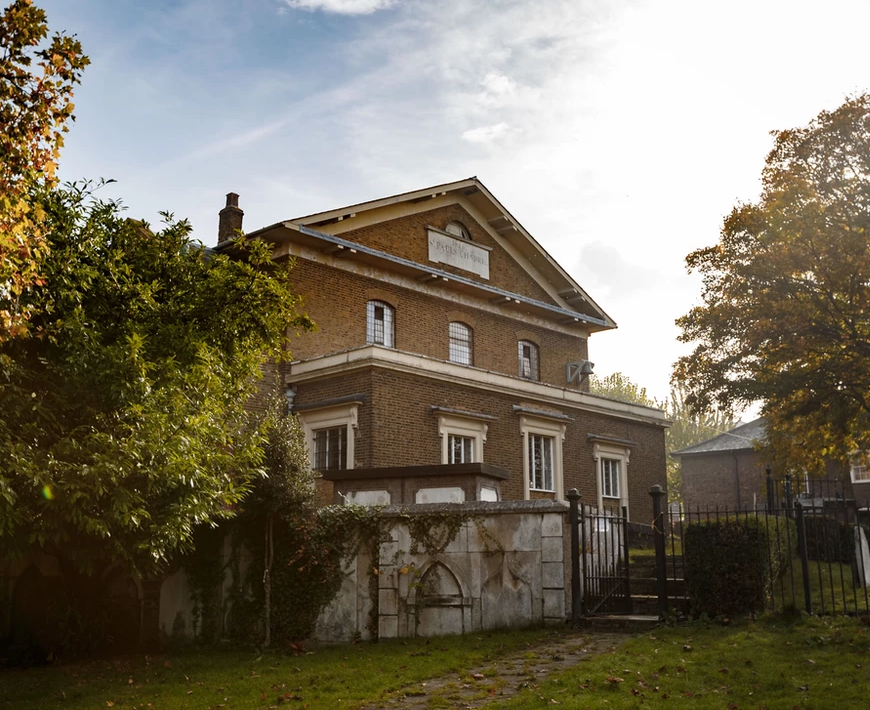
- Three bay West End under pediment with plaque "1815 ST PAULS CHURCH" with lunette over
- St Paul's Church, Clapham
- 51.4689°N 0.1403°W
- Location: Rectory Grove, Clapham, Greater London, SW4 0DX
- Country: England
- Denomination: Church of England
- Churchmanship: Inclusive Central
- Website: www.stpaulsclapham.org

History
- Status: Active

Architecture
- Functional status: Parish church
- Heritage designation: Grade II* listed
- Designated: 14 July 1955
- Architect: Christopher Edmonds
- Completed: 1815
- Construction cost: £5000

Specifications
- Materials: London stock brick, Slate roof

Administration
- Province: Province of Canterbury
- Diocese: Diocese of Southwark
- Archdeaconry: Lambeth
- Deanery: Lambeth North
- Benefice: Clapham St Paul
- Parish: Clapham St Paul

Clergy
- Vicar: Revd Canon Jonathan Boardman

St Paul's Church is a Church of England parish church in Clapham, London. There has been a church on the site since the 12th century. The current building was completed in 1815 and is Grade II* listed. In the grounds, which hold the Green Flag Award, are some fine tombs, including many early-19th-century sarcophagi, and a community garden, Eden. The incumbent is Revd Canon Jonathan Boardman.

== History ==
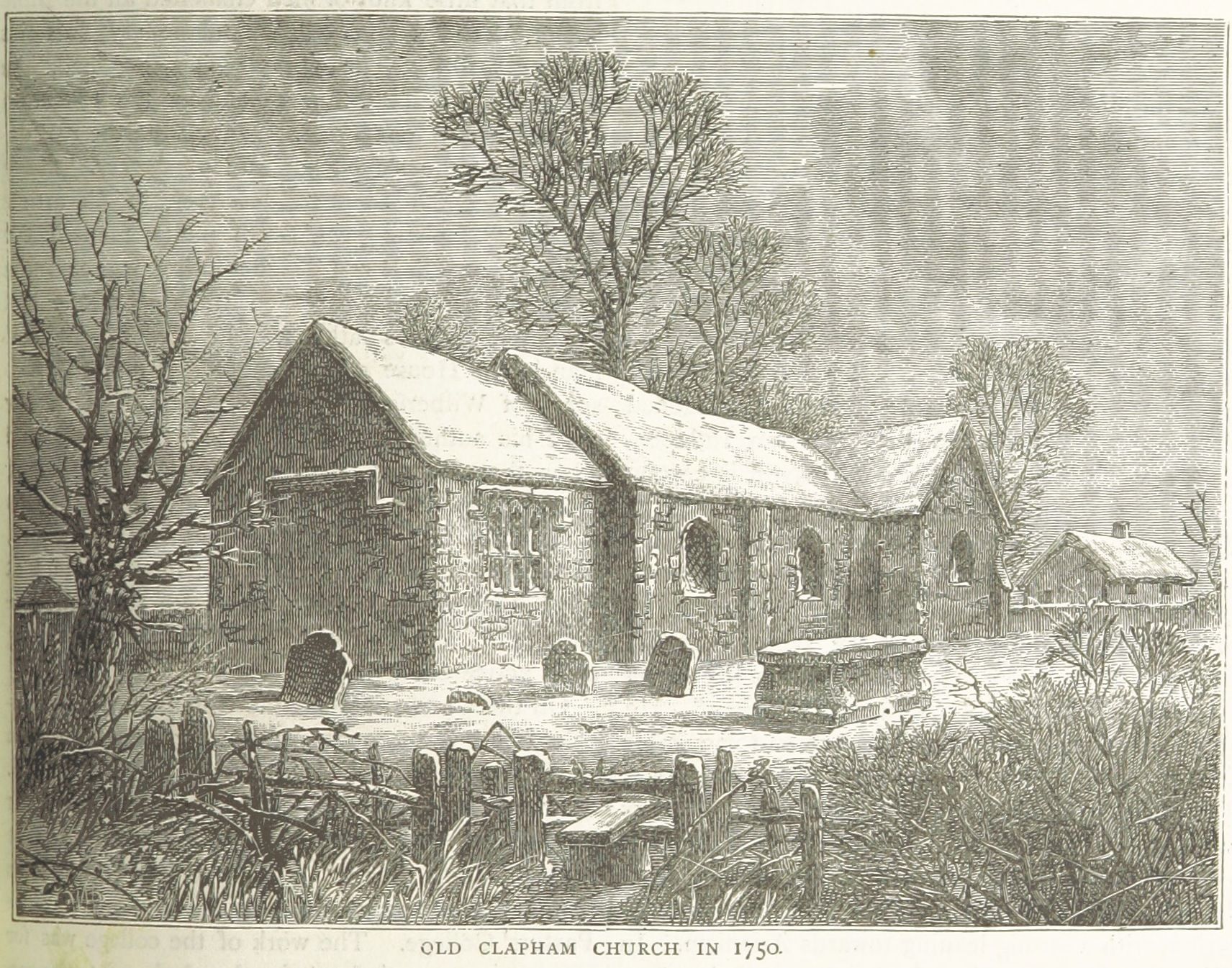
Old Clapham Church in 1750

The original parish church of Clapham was St Mary's Church which dated from the 12th century. St Mary's was renamed Trinity Church after the Reformation. It was taken down under an act of Parliament in 1774 and a new Holy Trinity Church was built on Clapham Common in 1775. The north aisle of the former church was left standing for the performance of burials.

St Paul's Church was built at the beginning of the 19th century on the site of the former St Mary's/Trinity Church. The building was completed in 1815 as a chapel of ease to Holy Trinity, Clapham. It was assigned a separate Ecclesiastical District in 1861.

=== Architecture ===
The architect was Christopher Edmonds of Newington, Surrey. The church was built from stock brick, with a fairly low pitched slate roof and is in the classical style. The original construction was a plain rectangular building with interior galleries at the west end and sides. In 1875, the church was extended at the east end by Sir Arthur Blomfield with a transept, a chancel and lower half octagonal apse. St Paul's is a cruciform church with a west entrance porch and a wide nave with aisles. The Victorian chancel and transept by Blomfield have round arched windows with roll moulding and pediments at each end of the transept. The side galleries were removed in 1928. The most severe damage caused to the church by the bombing during World War II occurred on the night of 10 May 1941. Incendiary bombs lodged in the roof and burned through before they could be extinguished, damaging the chancel and sanctuary. The building was completely restored and redecorated after the war, and on 14 July 1955, the church was designated a Grade II* listed building. Following a further internal reorganisation in 1970, the south semitransept is now a Lady chapel.

=== Present day ===
St Paul's stands in the central tradition of the Church of England. The parish of St. Paul, Clapham is part of the Archdeaconry of Lambeth in the Diocese of Southwark.

== Organ ==
The pipe organ at St Paul's was built in 1886 by Forster and Andrews. The organ originally stood in the south semitransept, the current location of the Lady Chapel, before the 1970 reorganisation of the building. A complete, historically congruent rebuild of the organ was finished in 2019 by Andrew Cooper & Co. Ltd.

== Community Centre ==
The East End extension designed by Blomfield was converted into a community centre in 1970, reducing the church to its original size. The centre is home to a Montessori nursery school and a number of user groups including a community choir. The church is used as a performance space by an opera company, a chamber music ensemble and for theatrical productions by Paul's Players.

== Churchyard ==
The churchyard was closed for burials in 1854. Among those buried in the churchyard were Roundhead soldiers killed in the English Civil War. The churchyard has largely been cleared of gravestones but the Revd T. C. Dale made a record in the 1920s of all gravestones and monumental inscriptions existing at the time. The churchyard is home to "Eden at St. Paul's", a popular community garden. It is one of Lambeth's longest standing Green Flag Award-winning sites.

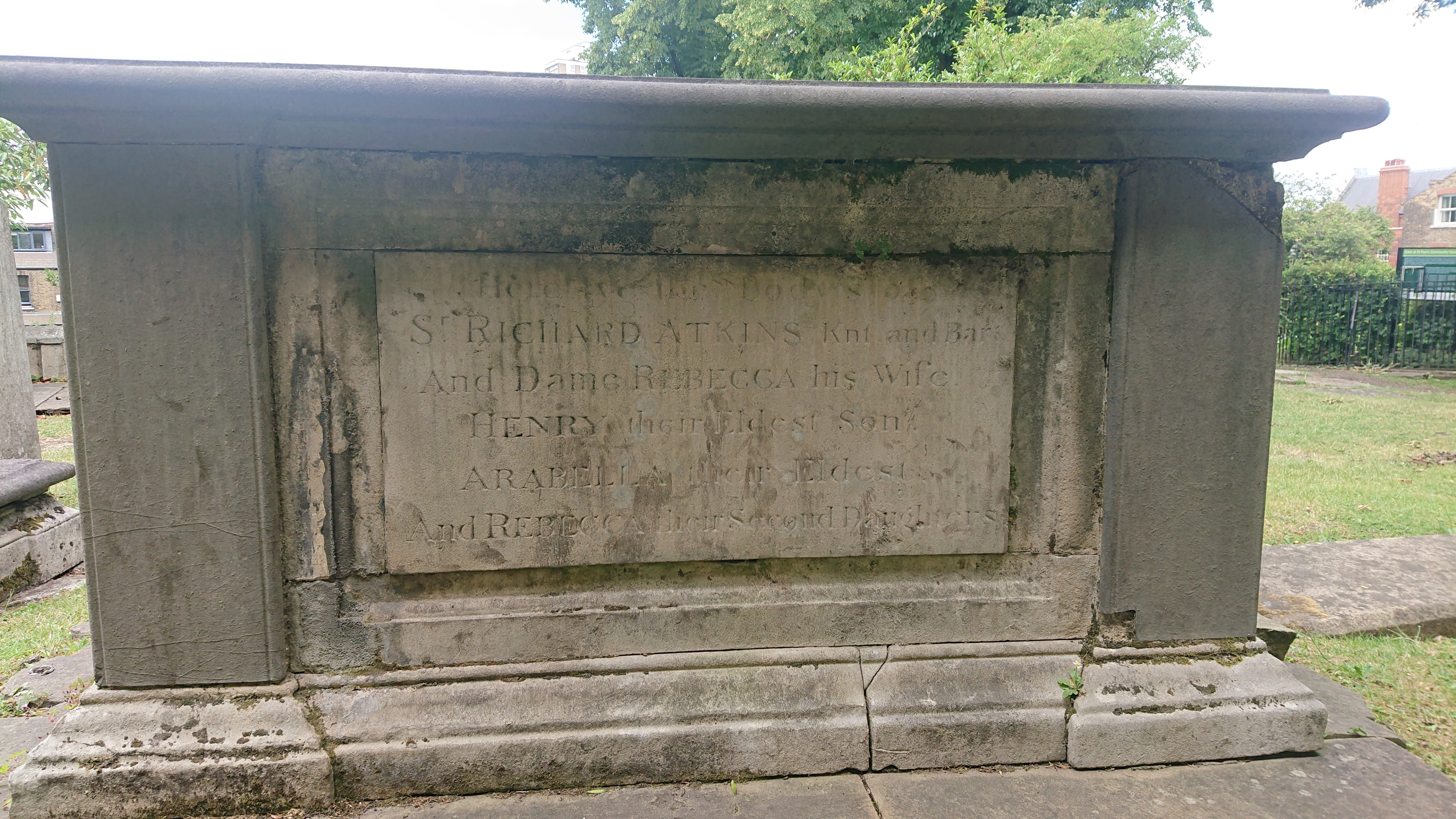
The Atkins family tomb

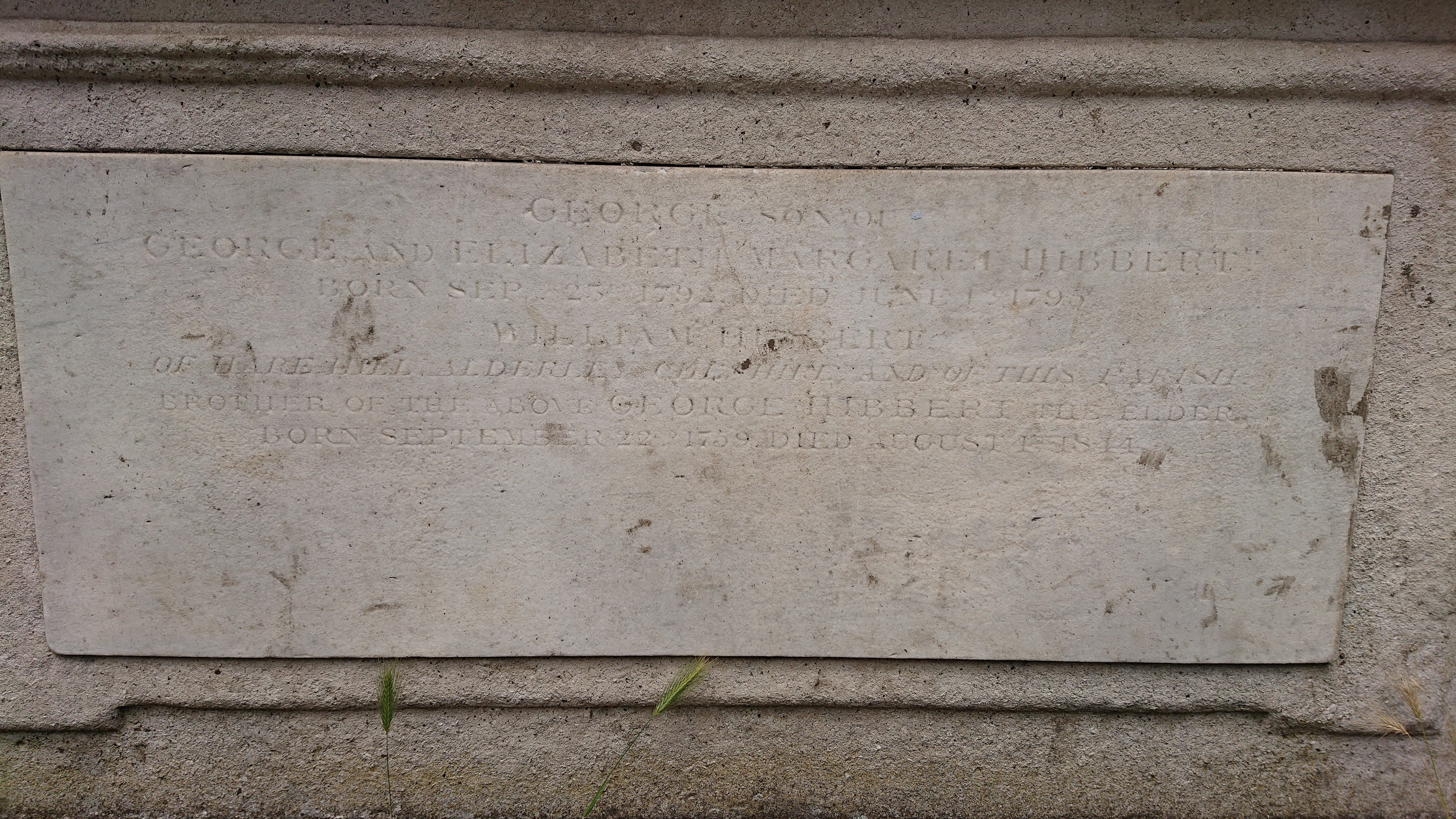
The Hibbert family tomb

=== Tombs ===
- The Hibbert family, George (1792–1795), first child of George Hibbert and Elizabeth Margaret Hibbert
- The Atkins family, Sir Richard Atkins 1st Baronet of Clapham

== Notable clergy ==
- Helen Cunliffe, later Archdeacon of St Albans, served as the church's first female vicar from 1994 to 1995, having been deacon-in-charge since 1989.
- Justine Allain Chapman, later Archdeacon of Boston, served as vicar from 1997 to 2004
- Deborah Matthews, now vicar of the Parish of Verwood, served as the parish's third consecutive female vicar from 2004 to 2017 (Area Dean 2013 - 2017)

== Memorials ==
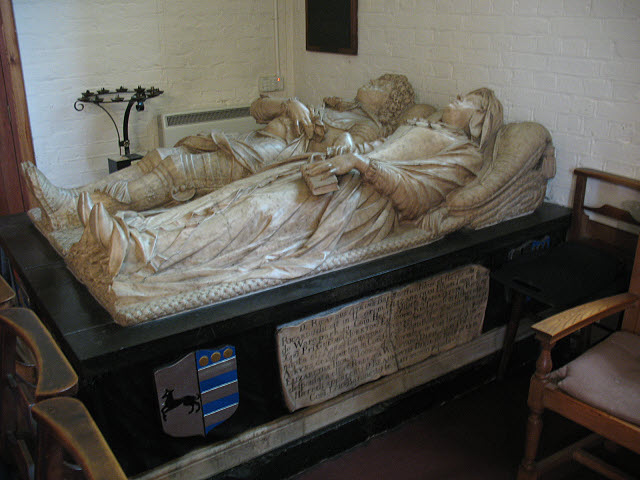
The Atkins memorial in the Lady Chapel

- Atkins baronets, memorial attributed to William Stanton
- Bartholomew Clerke, Lord of Clapham Manor
- John Hatchard, publisher and bookseller
- William Hewer, large, unsigned Baroque memorial, attributed to Francis Bird and modelled on the Memorial to Maria Raggi by Gian Lorenzo Bernini in Santa Maria sopra Minerva in Rome
- Martin Lister, physician to Queen Anne
- Henry Thornton, leading member of the Clapham Sect
- Henry Venn, clergyman and co-founder of the Clapham Sect
- John Broadley Wilson (1764–1835), Treasurer of the Baptist Missionary Society, by Francis Leggatt Chantrey

== Contested heritage ==
A review commissioned by Lambeth Council, following the Black Lives Matter protests during 2020, to identify locations in Lambeth with historic direct and indirect links to the trans-Atlantic slave trade and colonialism, included both the memorial plaque to William Hewer and the Hibbert family tomb as having proven associations. The incumbent vicar of St Paul's is an ex officio trustee of the Hibbert Almshouse Charity, which manages the Hibbert Almshouses which stand within the parish boundary.

== In popular culture ==
St Paul's was the filming location for the funeral scene in the 2003 Richard Curtis film Love Actually.

== Bibliography ==
- Lush, Sarah. St. Paul's, Clapham. London: PCC of St. Paul's Church Clapham
- Dale, TC. Our Clapham Forefathers
