= Justine Allain Chapman =

British Anglican priest and academic

The Reverend Justine Allain Chapman
- Archdeacon of Boston
- Diocese: Diocese of Lincoln
- In office: September 2013 to August 2025
- Predecessor: New appointment
- Successor: Archdeaconry dissolved

Orders
- Ordination: 1993 (deacon); 1994 (priest)

Personal details
- Born: Justine Penelope Heathcote Chapman; 30 June 1967 (age 59)
- Denomination: Anglicanism
- Spouse: Thomas Allain (m. 1990)
- Children: 4
- Education: King's College London; Lincoln Theological College; University of Nottingham

Justine Penelope Heathcote Allain Chapman (née Chapman; born 30 June 1967) is a British Anglican priest, academic, and former teacher. From September 2013 to August 2025, she served as the first (and only) Archdeacon of Boston in the Diocese of Lincoln (this Archdeaconry was dissolved in November 2025). Since August 2025, she has been Director of Pastoral Studies and Tutor in Practical Theology for the Eastern Region Ministry Course (ERMC). She was previously a religious studies teacher, a parish priest in the Diocese of Southwark, and then a member of the teaching staff of South East Institute for Theological Education (SEITE).

== Early life and education ==
Justine Chapman was born on 30 June 1967 in Durham, England. She studied at King's College London, graduating with a Bachelor of Arts (BA) degree and the Associateship of King's College (AKC) in 1988. She remained at King's College to undertake teacher training, and she completed her Postgraduate Certificate in Education (PGCE) in 1989. She then spent two years, from 1989 to 1991, as head of religious studies at South Hampstead High School, an all-girls private school in South Hampstead, London.

In 1991, Allain Chapman entered Lincoln Theological College, an Anglican theological college, to train for Holy Orders. During this time she also studied theology at the University of Nottingham, and she graduated with a Master of Divinity (M.Div.) degree in 1993. She later continued her studies, and graduated from King's College London with a Doctor of Theology and Ministry (DThMin) degree in 2011.

== Ordained ministry ==
Allain Chapman was ordained in the Church of England as a deacon in 1993 and as a priest in 1994. From 1993 to 1996, she served her curacy at Christ Church and St Paul, Forest Hill in the Diocese of Southwark. She served as Vicar of St Paul's Church, Clapham between 1996 and 2004. She was a member of General Synod of the Church of England from 2000 to 2004, having been elected by the clergy of the Diocese of Southwark as one of their representatives. In 2004, she joined the South East Institute for Theological Education (SEITE) as Director of Mission and Pastoral Studies. She was additionally Vice-Principal of the SEITE between 2007 and 2013.

In March 2013, it was announced that Allain Chapman had been appointed as the Archdeacon of Boston in the Diocese of Lincoln; this would bring the number of archdeacons in the diocese to three. She was installed as archdeacon during a service at Lincoln Cathedral on 8 September 2013. In 2015, she was elected a member of General Synod of the Church of England for the Diocese of Lincoln.

In March 2025 it was announced that she had been appointed to be Director of Pastoral Studies and Tutor in Practical Theology for the Eastern Region Ministry Course (ERMC), taking up her new role on 11 August 2025 (and resigning her archdeaconry on or around that date).

== Personal life ==
In 1990, the then Justine Chapman married Thomas Allain; she added her husband's surname to hers to create a double-barrelled surname (and her husband did likewise); together they have four children.

== Selected works ==
- Allain-Chapman, Justine (2012). Resilient pastors: the role of adversity in healing and growth. London: SPCK Publishing. ISBN 978-0281063833.
