= Peter Graystone =

English Christian writer

Peter Graystone (born 7 July 1958 in Mill Hill, North London) is a Christian writer. He has lived since 1966 in South Croydon. He read English at Trinity College, Oxford, then took a Post-Graduate Certificate in Education at the Institute of Education in London and briefly taught at Christ Church Primary School in Purley. He then joined UK missionary society, the Scripture Union as a writer and editor. His focus was on rethinking and writing about the place of children in church, and especially their reception to communion, culminating in his first book, Help, There's A Child in My Church (Scripture Union:1989). He developed the long-running all-age worship Scripture Union resource SALT and produced other books including A Church for All Ages in association with Eileen Turner.

He moved to UK aid agency Christian Aid to develop their resources for churches, producing 365 Ways to Make a Difference (Christian Aid:2005). At the same time he produced popular devotional texts including Signs of the Times: Modern Icons and Their Meanings (Canterbury Press:2004), Detox Your Spiritual Life in 40 Days (Canterbury Press:2004), 99 Things to do between here and Heaven (Canterbury Press:2006) and Be Happy: a 40 Day Journey to Contentment (Canterbury Press:2009). In 2008 he wrote the Collins 'Need to Know' guide to Christianity (Collins:2008).

In 2009 he became the National Development Officer for Fresh Expressions for the Anglican missionary society Church Army. In 2010 he was appointed Coordinator of the Christian Enquiry Agency. In 2018 he became the Lay Training Officer of the Anglican Diocese of Southwark. He reviews theatre for the Church Times.

== Bibliography ==
- Scarecrows (1988),
- Help, There's A Child In My Church (1989)
- The J Team (1990)
- You're Only Young Once (1992)
- A Church for All Ages (1993)
- Ready Salted (1998)
- 365 Ways to Make a Difference (2005)
- Signs of the Times: Modern Icons and Their Meanings (2004)
- Detox Your Spiritual Life in 40 Days (2004)
- 99 Things to do between here and Heaven (2006)
- Christianity (Collins Need to Know?) (2008)
- Be Happy: a 40 Day Journey to Contentment (2009)
- The Bare Bible: Uncovering the Bible for the First Time (2018)
