= Una Dillon =

- Born: Agnes Joseph Madeline Dillon; 8 January 1903; Cricklewood
- Died: 4 April 1993 (aged 90); Hove
- Known for: founding Dillons Booksellers

Agnes Joseph Madeline Dillon (8 January 1903 – 4 April 1993), known as Una Dillon, was a British bookseller. She founded Dillons Booksellers.

== Life ==
Agnes Joseph Madeline Dillon was born in Cricklewood and she was known as "Una". Dillon was born in Hendon to Teresa and Joseph Thomas Dillon. She was one of six children who their Catholic parents paid to get well educated. The elder brother died during World War I, a sister became a nun and another brother emigrated. Carmen, Agnes (Una) and Teresa were left to fulfil their parent's ambition for them. Dillon was working for the charity now known as Mind dealing with books. She enjoyed this and decided to set herself up in business with a bookstore. Her parents lent her money and she bought out a shop which she thought she could improve.

Dillon bought Dillons Booksellers' first building on Gower Street in London, near University College London, in 1936. Dillon drove the business forward delivering books by bike within her own target of eight hours. Her business thrived and her customers, and friends, included C. Day Lewis, the poet John Betjeman and other bibliophiles.

Dillon subsequently sold the majority of the company to the University of London in 1956, with the proviso that it used her name. Dillon retired from the business in 1968.

None of the three Dillon sisters married and they spent 42 years together in a large flat in Kensington. Tess Dillon had led the physics department at Queen Elizabeth College. In 1985 Una retired to Hove with her sister Carmen. Carmen became a film and production designer who won an Oscar for the 1948 Olivier film of Hamlet. Una died in 1993. Carmen survived her sister and died in 2000.
