= David O'Gara =

Roscommon Gaelic footballer

Personal information
- Born: County Roscommon, Ireland

Sport
- Sport: Gaelic football
- Position: Forward
Club
- Years: Club
- 2000s–: Roscommon Gaels
Club titles
- Roscommon titles: 0
College
- Years: College
- NUI Galway
Inter-county
- Years: County
- 2008–: Roscommon
Inter-county titles
- Connacht titles: 1
- All-Irelands: 0
- NFL: 0
- All Stars: 0

David O'Gara is an Irish Gaelic footballer who plays for Roscommon Gaels and the Roscommon county team. He was a member of the Roscommon panel that won the 2010 Connacht Senior Football Championship with a defeat of Sligo by 0–14 to 0–13. O'Gara has also played for NUI Galway.

O'Gara's father John played for Roscommon in the 1970s and 1980s, while his brother Ricky is an All-Ireland title holder in handball.

== Honours ==
- 2006 All-Ireland Minor Football Championship
- 2006 Connacht Minor Football Championship
- 2010 Connacht Senior Football Championship
