= Harriet Baber =

American philosopher professor (born 1950)

Harriet Erica Baber (born January 6, 1950) is an American professor of philosophy at the University of San Diego. She holds a Ph.D from Johns Hopkins University, 1980. Her research interests are in analytic metaphysics, philosophical theology, feminism and philosophy of economics. In addition, Baber writes for The Guardian and is a regular columnist for Church Times. She is an Episcopalian.

== Publications ==
- Baber, Harriet Erica, and Denise E. Dimon. Globalization and International Development: The Ethical Issues. Buffalo, New York: Broadview Press, 2013. ISBN 1554810124
- Baber, Harriet Erica. The Multicultural Mystique: The Liberal Case against Diversity. Amherst, N.Y.: Prometheus Books, 2008. ISBN 9781591025535
- Baber, Harriet. Women's Dilemma: Is It Reasonable to Be Rational? Kalamazoo, Mich: Western Michigan University. Center for the Study of Ethics in Society, 1990. OCLC 23155326
