= John O'Gara =

Irish Gaelic footballer

John O'Gara is an Irish former Gaelic footballer who played for Roscommon Gaels and the Roscommon county team.

A midfielder, he won Connacht Senior Football Championship titles in 1977, 1978, 1979 and 1980. He also played at centre-forward in the 1980 All-Ireland Senior Football Championship final, Roscommon's first for 18 years. He had to retire from inter-county football in 1982 because of repetitive knee injuries.

With Roscommon Gaels O'Gara played in the 1976 All-Ireland Senior Club Football Championship final, also winning the 1974 and 1975 Connacht Senior Club Football Championship titles and three Roscommon Senior Football Championship titles in this period.

O'Gara is a golfer. Shortly after Christmas in 2007, the bar of his family's hotel, in Roscommon town, burnt down alongside another of their family businesses, Jack's, though other family businesses such as Mac's Bar and Rockford's Nightclub were saved. His son David played for Roscommon too, winning a Connacht Minor Football Championship title in 2006, then was involved with the senior team. Another son, Ricky, is an All-Ireland title holder in handball.
