= Dillons the Bookstore =

British Bookstore

Coordinates: 51°31′20.4″N 0°7′56.06″W

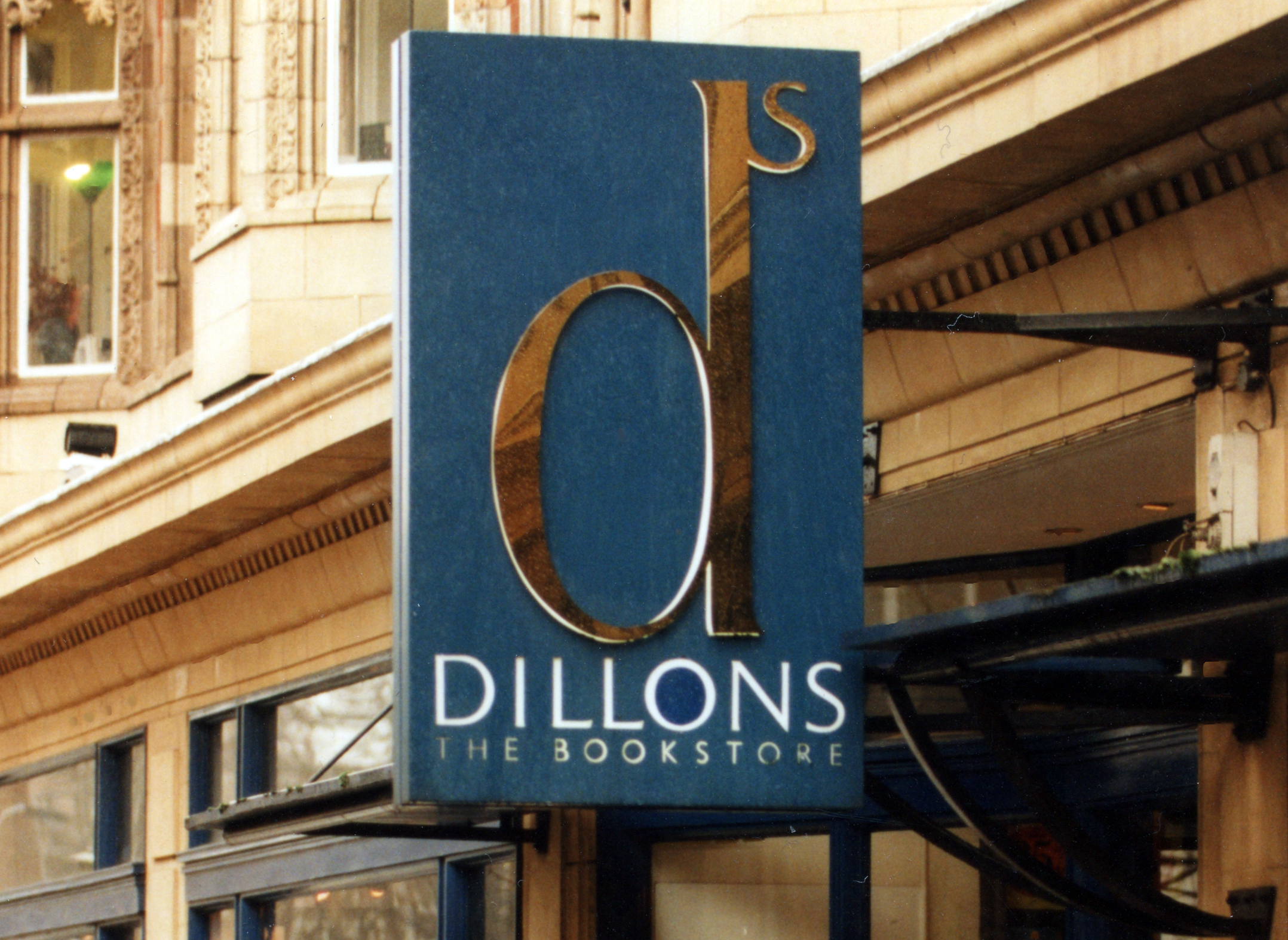
The main entrance to Dillons' flagship Gower Street branch in London in 1996

Dillons was a British bookseller founded in 1936, named after its founder and owner Una Dillon. Originally based in Bloomsbury in London, the company expanded under subsequent owners Pentos in the 1980s into a bookselling chain across the United Kingdom. In 1995 Pentos went into receivership and sold Dillons to Thorn EMI, which immediately closed 40 of the 140 Dillons bookstore locations. Of the remaining 100 stores, most kept the name Dillons, while the remainder were Hatchards and Hodges Figgis. Within Thorn EMI, Dillons was placed in the HMV Group, which had been a division of Thorn EMI since 1986. EMI demerged from Thorn in August 1996, and Dillons-HMV remained an EMI holding. Dillons was subsumed under rival chain Waterstones' branding in 1999, at which point the brand ceased to exist.

== History ==
=== Store Street ===
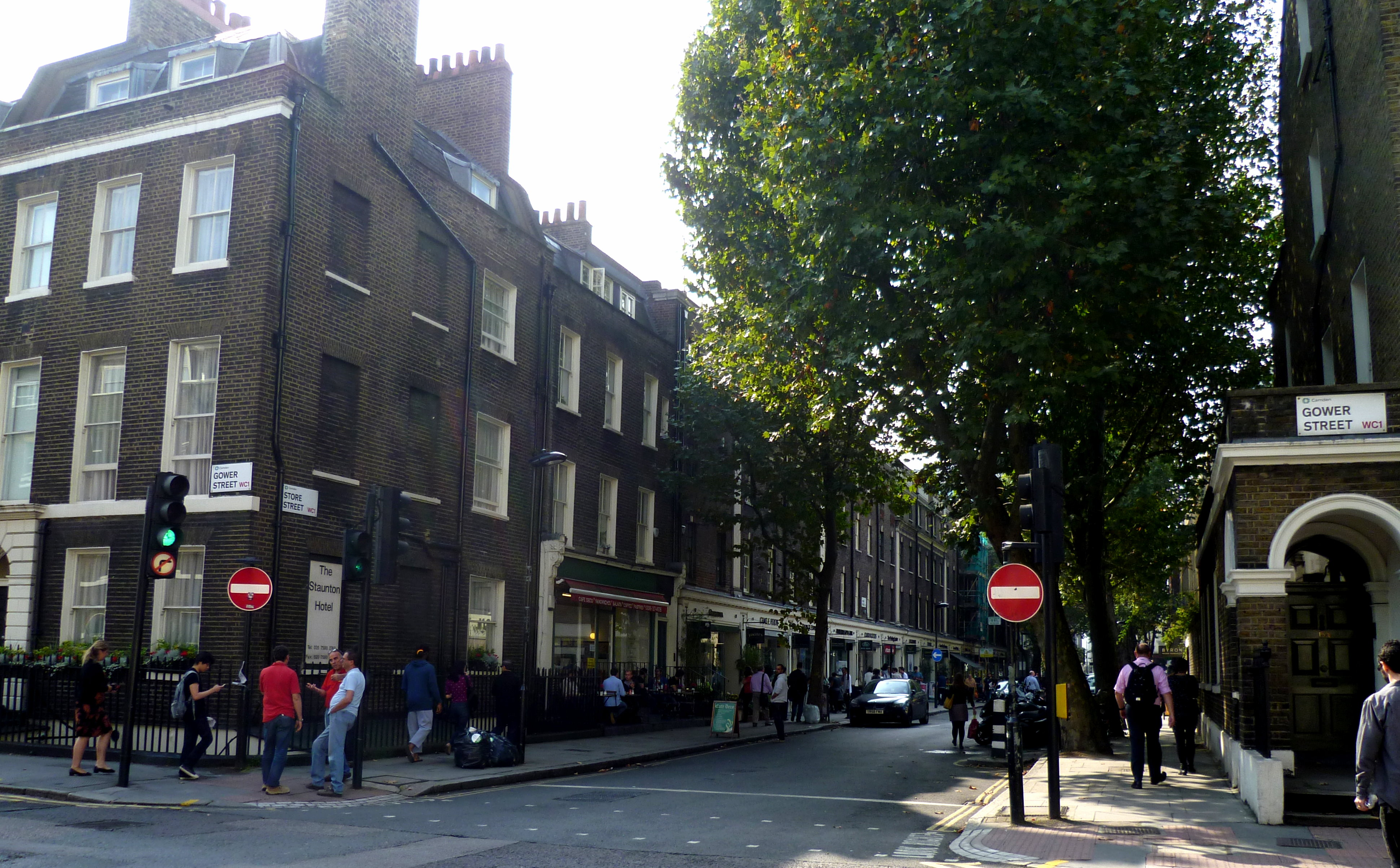
Store Street, London, site of the first Dillons Bookshop in 1936

Dillon's Bookshop was founded by Una Dillon in 1936 at 9 Store Street, between Gower Street and Tottenham Court Road in Bloomsbury. Dillon had become involved in the book trade through running bookstalls for the Central Association for Mental Welfare after graduating from Bedford College, London. Determined to build a career in bookselling she persuaded the owner of a failing bookshop to sell her the business for £800, borrowing £600 off her father and £200 from a friend.

Dillon stocked both academic and general titles, believing that specialisation stifled curiosity, and the shop prospered catering to the needs of staff and students of the nearby University of London. Dillon would deliver books herself by bicycle within eight hours and the shop began to attract bibliophiles, with regular customers including Cecil Day-Lewis and John Betjeman, who would also become Dillon's personal friends.

The outbreak of World War II saw the nearby University of London and Froebel College evacuated from London, but instead of closing for the war Dillon maintained contact with her customers and shipped orders to their new locations in Cardiff, Leicester and Hertfordshire, while also building a new customer base with the staff of the Ministry of Information who were now established in Senate House. When her shop suffered bomb damage she temporarily operated from an empty shop opposite.

=== Dillon's University Bookshop ===
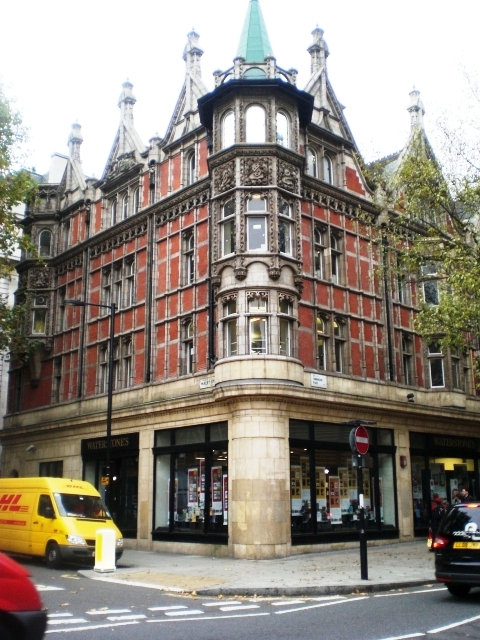
Dillon's University Bookshop originally occupied just the east end of the building that it would later take over completely

After the war Dillon increasingly focused on educational titles and her shop became an important supplier of books to students from the Commonwealth of Nations. Further expansion was impossible without outside support, however, and Dillon was one of several booksellers approached by the University of London, who were looking to form a partnership to open a bookshop alongside a chemist and a newsagent in a block the university had acquired after the war on Torrington Place, Gower Street and Malet Street. The block had been designed by architect Charles Fitzroy Doll and built in 1908 as a residential building with shops on the ground floor.

Although the initial proposal for a partnership fell through, in 1956 Dillon was again approached by the university, and agreed to use her stock and goodwill from Store Street to purchase a minority stake in a bookshop on the new site, on the understanding that the new shop would bear her name. The university contributed £11,000 in capital that it had obtained as an insurance payment for the death in a building accident of a workman who had no relatives.

When it opened in 1956, Dillon's University Bookshop only occupied the small part of the building at 1 Malet St, and in its first year saw turnover of £30,000. Una Dillon retired as managing director of the business in 1967 – by which time the shop occupied the entire building and had an annual turnover of over £1m – but she remained as a board member until 1977. Her place as managing director was taken by Peter Stockham. then followed a period when Dillons was controlled by the unions (Actss). Then in 1977, Grant Paton, from Glasgow, was appointed managing director by the then owners, University of London. It was taken over shortly afterwards by Pentos.

=== Expansion under Pentos ===
Back in private hands by the mid-1980s, the store undertook a major makeover and modernisation, announcing its relaunch with the advertising poster "Foyled again? Try Dillons" displayed prominently on the bus shelter opposite its London rival Foyles.

Inspired by the success of Waterstones, demonstrating the potential for large modern bookshops with a depth of stock, the new owners Pentos rapidly rolled out the format across the country, ultimately building up a chain of 75 stores. In 1990 Dillons bought Hatchards, based in Piccadilly and the oldest bookshop in the UK. However, having overreached itself financially, Dillons was acquired by Thorn EMI, which already held the HMV chain, for £36 million.

HMV acquired the larger Waterstones chain in 1998, and the following year the Dillons brand ceased to exist as a separate entity when the branches were rebranded as Waterstones. A remainder were sold on to the smaller chain Ottakar's, which itself was later taken over by Waterstones in 2006.

== See also ==
- Books in the United Kingdom

== Bibliography ==
- Maher, Terry (1994). Against My Better Judgement: Adventures in the City and in the Book Trade. London: Sinclair Stevenson. ISBN 1-85619-518-X.
