= Church Times =

Weekly independent Anglican newspaper

- The front cover of the Church Times, on 10 January 2025, picturing Justin Welby, the former Archbishop of Canterbury
- Type: Weekly newspaper
- Format: Tabloid
- Owner: Hymns Ancient and Modern
- Publisher: GJ Palmer & Sons Ltd, a wholly owned subsidiary of Hymns Ancient and Modern
- Editor: Sarah Meyrick
- Founded: 7 February 1863; 163 years ago
- Political alignment: Church of England / Anglican Communion
- Language: English
- Headquarters: Invicta House, 108–114 Golden Lane, London
- ISSN: 0009-658X
- Website: churchtimes.co.uk

The Church Times is an independent Anglican weekly newspaper based in London and published in the United Kingdom on Fridays. Its offices are based in London. The printed paper is published in the UK on Fridays.

Sarah Meyrick was appointed Editor in September 2024, succeeding Paul Handley, editor since 1995. In January 2025, the Church Times was redesigned under her headship, returning news to the front page and introducing new faith content, an expanded comment section, a monthly theology series, and podcast reviews.

== History ==
The Church Times was founded on 7 February 1863 by George Josiah Palmer, a printer. It fought for the Anglo-Catholic and high church cause in the Church of England at a time when priests were being harried and imprisoned over such matters as lighting candles on altars and wearing vestments, which brought them into conflict with the Public Worship Regulation Act 1874, intended to "put down" ritualism in the Church of England. The paper defended the spiritual independence of the Church of England in spite of the Church's Established status; many of the ceremonial and doctrinal matters that the paper championed are now accepted as part of mainstream Anglicanism. Its views were opposed by the Church of England Newspaper, which supported evangelical and low church positions.

It was previously (mainly among Anglo-Catholics in the 1970s and 1980s) nicknamed "Jezebel's Trumpet" (alluding to Jezebel, the wife of King Ahab of Israel in II Kings).

The paper's sympathies have broadened since the mid-1950s, embracing the principle of diversity of practice in the worldwide Anglican Communion, and looking more favourably on other Christian denominations.

The paper has always been independent of the church hierarchy. From its foundation until 1989 it was owned by the Palmer family, ending with Bernard Palmer, who combined the tasks of owner and editor for the final 20 years. He sold it to the charity Hymns Ancient and Modern, then chaired by Henry Chadwick.

Throughout its life, it has scrutinised the actions of the church hierarchy, as well as covering the work of the parishes. It has provided coverage of meetings of the Church of England's central bodies, including the Archbishops' Council and the General Synod. Its published annual Indexes have always described it as an "ecclesiastical and general" newspaper, and it has always included world events in its coverage. This includes book reviews, coverage of the arts, and more recently, TV, radio, and podcasts.

The paper's regular columnists include Paul Vallely, the former associate editor of The Independent, the poet and priest Malcolm Guite, and the priest and broadcaster Angela Tilby. Giles Fraser, the priest and media commentator, was a regular columnist from 2004 to 2013. The author Ronald Blythe wrote the "Word from Wormingford" column from 1993 to 2017. Edward Heath was the paper's news editor from February 1948 to September 1949.

From 1951 to 2019, the paper hosted an inter-diocesan cricket competition, the Church Times Cricket Cup.

The paper was named Niche Newspaper of the Year at the 2009 at the national Newspaper Awards, and won the award for Best Use of Colour in 2010.

In February 2013, the Church Times marked its 150th anniversary.

In April 2014, the paper published an article by David Cameron. He wrote: "I am a member of the Church of England, and, I suspect, a rather classic one: not that regular in attendance, and a bit vague on some of the more difficult parts of the faith. But that doesn't mean the Church of England doesn't matter to me or people like me: it really does."

In the run-up to the 2017 general election, the leaders of the three main political parties wrote for the paper on the importance of international development.

A weekly podcast was launched in March 2017.

In November 2017, the paper's then deputy news and features editor, Madeleine Davies, received an award from the Awareness Foundation for "her extraordinary work in the Christian media; her great courage and integrity as a source of inspiration and encouragement to people of faith everywhere." The award was presented by Sophie, Countess of Wessex. Previous winners have included the BBC's Middle East Editor, Jeremy Bowen and Baroness Berridge.

In April 2018, the Archbishop of Canterbury awarded the paper's former Education Correspondent, Margaret Holness, the Canterbury Cross for Services to the Church of England, "for sustained excellence as Education Correspondent of the Church Times for over twenty years".

In 2025, the paper's staff writer Francis Martin was jointly awarded Young Journalist of the Year by the Religion Media Centre for his investigative report which challenged the conclusion of the Makin review about the responses of the diocese of Ely, and of Lambeth Palace, to the abuse perpetrated by John Smyth.

The Church Times also holds several festivals and events. This includes the now annual Church Times Festival of Faith and Literature, the Church Times Festival of Poetry, and the Church Times Festival of Preaching. It also organises the Church Times Green Health Awards^{[34]} and hosts regular webinars on key topics of debate with the Church. More recently this has included: Independent Safeguarding; Can a 'good death' be assisted?; Church growth under the microscope; and Keeping Faith in Journalism: Why it matters.

In 2024, Paul Handley retired after 29 years as Editor.

Sarah Meyrick, a former features editor at the paper and latterly assistant editor in charge of events, was appointed his successor in September 2024. She is only the second woman to edit the paper, after Rosamund Essex (1950–60).

== Editors ==
- George J. Palmer (1863–1887)
- Henry J. Palmer (1887–1914)
- E. Hermitage Day (1915–24)
- Sidney Dark (1924–41)
- Leonard Prestige (1941–47)
- Humphry Beevor (1947–50; later Bishop of Lebombo)
- Rosamund Essex (1950–60))
- Roger L. Roberts (1960–68)
- Bernard Palmer (1969–89)
- John Whale (1989–95; former BBC head of religious programmes and Sunday Times writer)
- Paul Handley (1995–2024)
- Sarah Meyrick (2024–present)

== Contemporary contributors ==
- Paul Vallely
- Malcolm Guite
- Andrew Brown
- Angela Tilby
- Angus Ritchie
- Eve Poole (author)
- Mark Oakley
- Rowan Williams
- Paula Gooder
- Mark Vernon
- Lucy Winkett
- Nick Spencer
- Malcolm Doney
- Andrew Davison
- Philip North
- Sam Wells
- Richard Harries
- Muriel Porter (Australia Correspondent)
- Stephen Cottrell
- Sarah Coakley
- John Saxbee
- David Brown (theologian)
- John Barton (theologian)
- Graham James
- John Inge
- Peter Selby
- Robin Gill (priest)
- Peter Graystone
- Simon Parke
- Elaine Storkey
- Alan Storkey
- David Winter
- Harriet Baber
- Madeleine Davies

== Past contributors ==
- David Martin (sociologist)
- Felix Aprahamian
- Jonathan Bartley
- Ronald Blythe
- Douglas Brown (BBC's first religious affairs correspondent)
- Gerald Butt (Middle East correspondent)
- David Edwards (priest)
- Giles Fraser
- Monica Furlong
- Elizabeth Goudge
- Sir Edward Heath (news editor)
- Margaret Holness (Education Correspondent)
- John Keble
- J. N. D. Kelly
- Patrick Maitland (later 17th Earl of Lauderdale)
- Cole Moreton (news editor)
- Donald Maxwell (artist)
- Norman Nicholson
- T. E. Utley
- Alec Vidler
- William Wand (former Bishop of London)
- Martin Warner
- N. T. Wright (later Bishop of Durham)
- Charlotte Mary Yonge

== Cartoonists ==
- Noel Ford
- Dave Walker
- Ron Wood
- Dave Gaskill
- Pete Dredge
- Bill Caldwell
- Kathryn Lamb

== Historical ==
The hymn "Onward, Christian Soldiers" was first published in the Church Times (15 October 1864).

Edward Heath, the future British Prime Minister, was news editor of the Church Times from February 1948 to September 1949. His work was "a mixture of administration, reporting, and sub-editing". His assignments for the paper included covering the 1948 Anglo-Catholic Congress and Wand's Mission to London.

N. T. Wright (Tom Wright) was a weekly devotional columnist (Sunday's Readings) from 1995 to 2000. He has said that writing the columns gave him the "courage" to embark upon his popular For Everyone (SPCK) series of commentaries on New Testament books.
