= Hodges Figgis =

Bookshop in Dublin, Ireland

Coordinates: 53.34224°N 6.25815°W

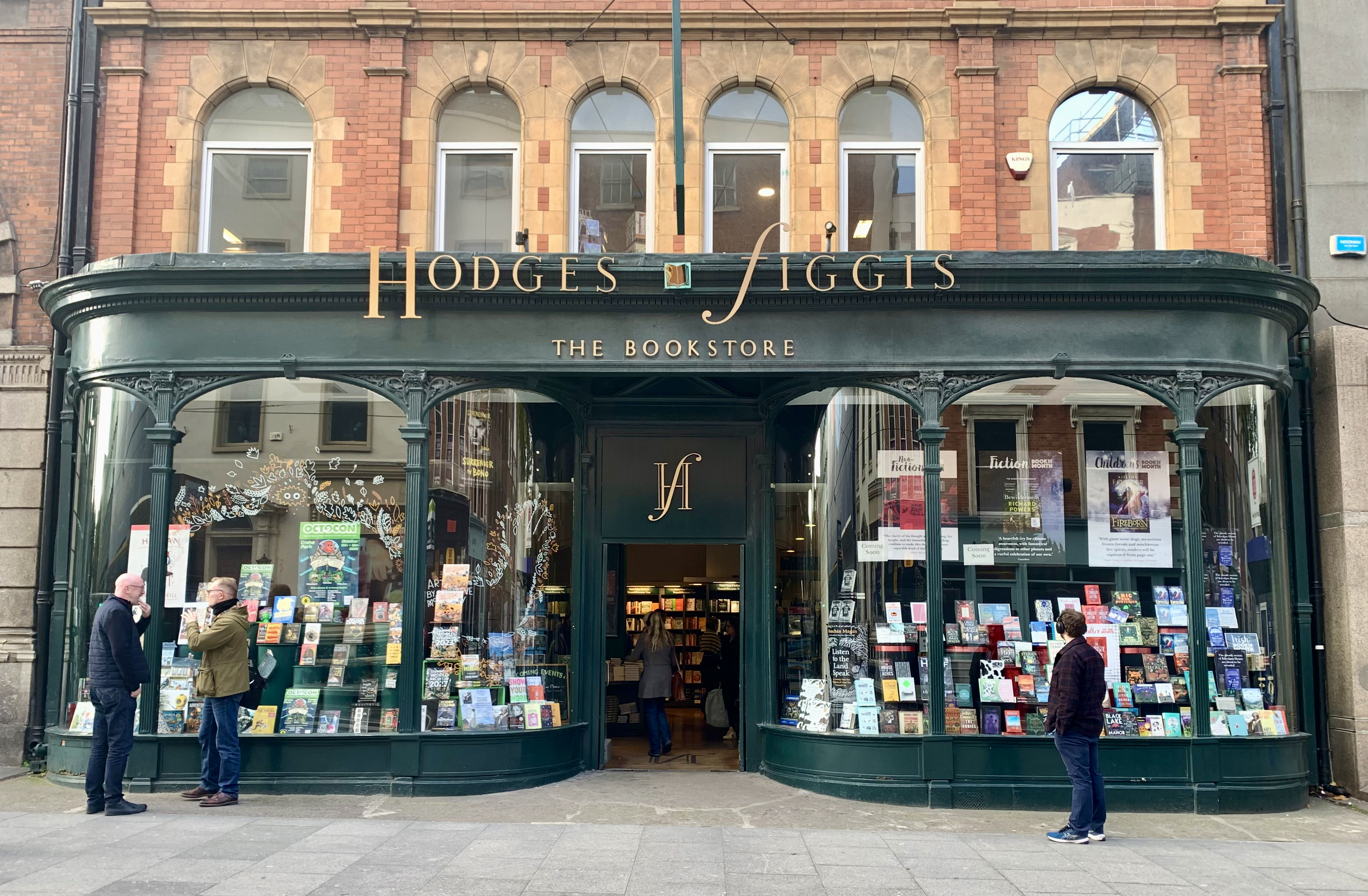
- Industry: Bookshop
- Founded: 10 Skinner's Row (now Christchurch Place), Dublin, 1768; 258 years ago
- Founder: John Milliken
- Headquarters: Dublin, Ireland
- Number of locations: 1 shop
- Area served: Ireland
- Products: Books
- Parent: Waterstones Booksellers Ireland Ltd
- Website: www.hodgesfiggis.ie

Hodges Figgis is a long-operating bookshop in central Dublin, Ireland. Founded in 1768, it is probably the third-oldest functioning bookshop in the world, after the Livraria Bertrand of Lisbon (1732) and Pennsylvania's Moravian Book Shop (1745). It was moved and expanded numerous times, and arrived at 56 Dawson Street in 1979, and gradually expanded to take its current form of four floors at 56-58 Dawson Street in 1992. It is mentioned in James Joyce's modernist novel Ulysses, at the time of which it would have been situated at 104 Grafton Street, and the novel Conversations with Friends by Sally Rooney, and in other writings.

Since 2011, Hodges Figgis has been owned and operated by Waterstones, which in turn is owned by US investment management firm Elliott Investment Management and A&NN Capital Fund Management (an investment fund owned by Russian billionaire Alexander Mamut).

== History ==
=== 18th century ===
The bookshop was opened in 1768 at 10 Skinner's Row, near Christ Church Cathedral, by a John Milliken, son of a local property owner. Milliken moved it to 32 Grafton Street in 1797.

=== 19th century ===
In 1819, the Milliken family moved the shop to 104 Grafton Street, where it operated for over a century. The shop's records note that in 1822, proprietor Richard Milliken stood with his 22 daughters on the shop's balcony for a royal visit by George IV. Following financial problems, the shop, run by Andrew Milliken since 1834, was taken over by Hodges and Smith, booksellers of College Green since the 1760s. Hodges and Smith also published books, notably including works of Irish interest. The business published for more than a hundred years thereafter.

After the death of George Smith, a new operating partnership saw it become Hodges, Foster & Company. A further new partnership with an employee, Samuel Figgis, led to it becoming Hodges, Figgis & Company.

Hodges, Figgis & Company Limited was registered as a company in 1892, when Samuel Figgis was sole proprietor following a retirement. A son of Samuel Figgis, William Fernsley Figgis, led the next generation of the shop, alongside Samuel's successor as managing director, Thomas Brown.

=== 20th century ===
The impact of building works and wartime absence led to a financial restructuring in 1920, which saw the business surrender its premises and move to 20 Nassau Street. In 1945, it moved again, to 6 Dawson Street. Allen Figgis assumed control as owner and managing director in 1956, and expanded the shop into neighbouring premises at 7 Dawson Street. A paperback-specialised branch was opened in Suffolk Street, and publishing operations grew, with a notable release in 1968 of an Encyclopedia of Ireland. The shop also hosted major book launches, including that of a special edition of the Táin Bó Cúailnge with illustrations by Louis le Brocquy. A bicentennial event was held in 1968, marked by the release of a 1,700-volume Celtic Studies catalogue at a reception attended by Archbishop and scholar George Simms, and Allen and Francis, and Neville, Figgis.

In 1974, the shop was moved to St Stephen's Green. A warehouse was established in Donnybrook, and branches were opened in Donnybrook and Dún Laoghaire in the Dublin hinterland, and in Kilkenny and Cork. University bookshops were also added, at the University College Dublin (UCD) Belfield campus, and at University College Cork (UCC) and University College Galway (UCG). By 1977, the business had achieved a turnover of IR£800,000, and a net profit of £30,000.

In 1978, Allen Figgis sold the chain, then comprising the main shop at St Stephen's Green, and branches at Donnybrook, Dún Laoghaire and UCD, to Pentos, who owned the UK Dillons the Bookstore chain, for £132,000. Hodges Figgis took over the lease of 56 Dawson Street, the former Browne and Nolan bookshop, in 1979, for university, library supplies and Celtic studies sales, and eventually schoolbooks also. The UCD branch was closed, and Kilkenny and Cork outlets purchased. By 1981, all operations had moved to Dawson Street.

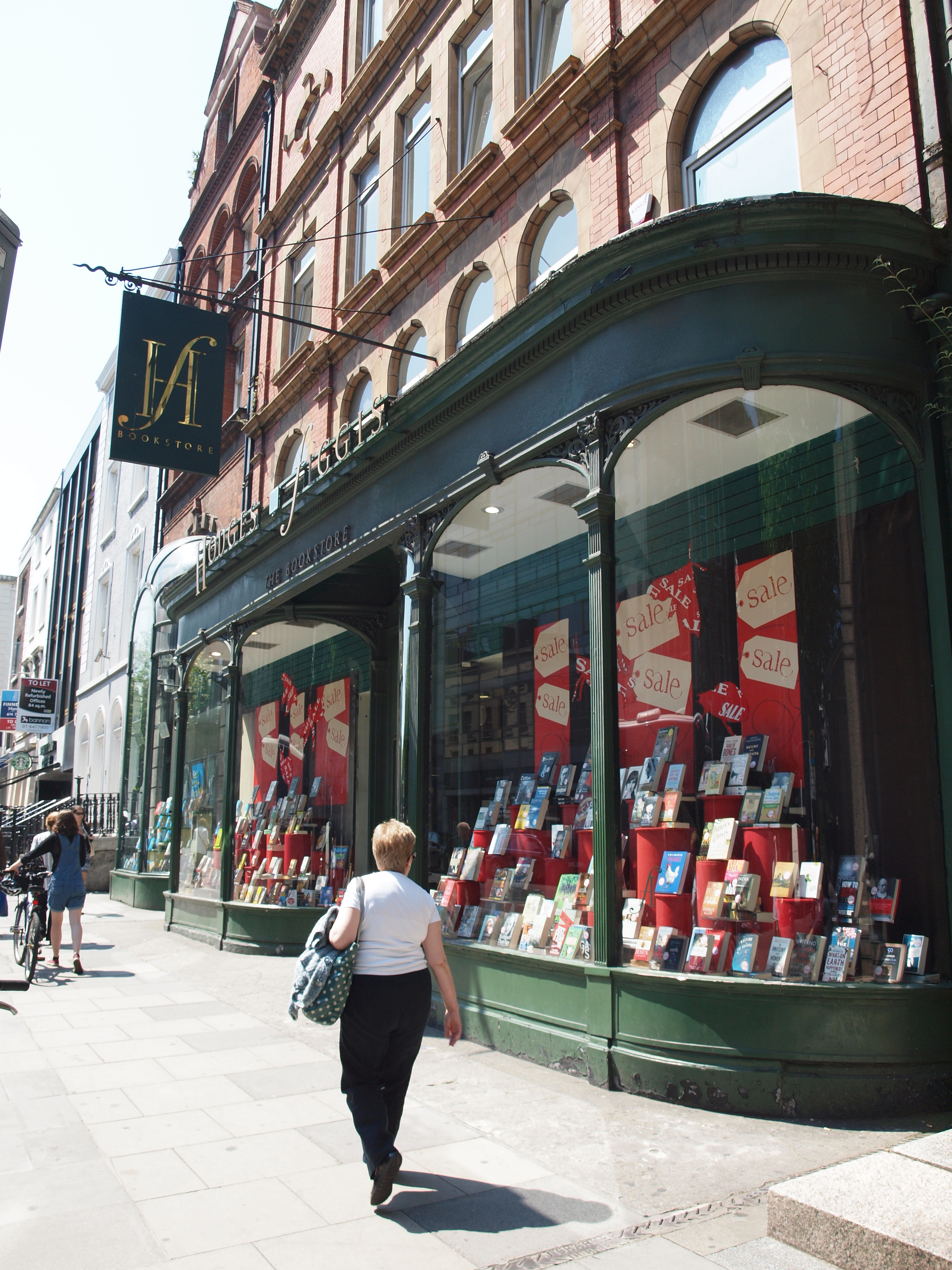
Approaching Hodges Figgis from Trinity College Dublin

Having moved to 57-58 Dawson Street, in 1992, the company re-acquired the lease on the 56 Dawson Street location. In 1995, Pentos went into receivership and its businesses, Dillons, including Hodges Figgis, and office stationery and furniture operations, were put up for sale. It was indicated that its Dawson Street and Dublin City University branches might be available to buy separately. In the end, Pentos entered receivership, and the bookselling business was sold to Thorn EMI, and in 1995, the Dawson Street shop closed for four hours to allow for the legal transfer of ownership, the only official disruption to trade in over 200 years.

In 1996, Thorn EMI was demerged into separate entities (Thorn Electrical Industries and EMI). Hodges Figgis and Waterstones were retained by EMI. In February 1998, EMI entered into a joint venture with Advent International to form HMV Media Group. The newly-formed entity acquired Hodges Figgis, the Waterstones chain of bookshops and the HMV chain of music shops. Hodges Figgis & Company Limited was dissolved in July 1999 and the business was merged into the Waterstones chain.

=== 21st century ===
The Dawson Street shop briefly housed a coffee shop on the first floor, but this was removed during renovations in 2002, to expand the space available for book display and sale.

In June 2011, HMV Group sold Waterstones (including Hodges Figgis) to A&NN Capital Fund Management (an investment fund owned by Russian Billionaire Alexander Mamut) for GB£53 million. In June 2018, US hedge fund Elliott Investment Management acquired a majority holding in Waterstones, with Mamut's company retaining a minority stake.

In 2018, Hodges Figgis celebrated its 250th anniversary with the publication of an anthology of modern Irish writing with 250 contributors.

Hodges Figgis continues to operate as part of the Waterstones group, although it operates its own loyalty stamp scheme instead of the Waterstones Plus card. In line with Waterstones operating strategy, it has considerable autonomy in buying and presentation. It was the second-highest performing shop in the chain in 2015 and 2018, only outstripped by the flagship Waterstones shop in Piccadilly, London. As of 2018, the shop typically stocked about a million volumes, with about 70,000 titles, more than five times the range of a typical high street bookshop, over three storeys and a basement. The shop specialises in Irish interest titles, and has a large academic section.

Hodges Figgis also operates the part-time student bookshop in Dublin City University. Waterstones operates 11 other shops in Ireland (in Ballymena, Belfast, Coleraine, Cork, Craigavon, Derry, Drogheda, Enniskillen, Lisburn and Newry), having closed its other Dublin shops (including one directly opposite Hodges Figgis) in 2011.

Hodges Figgis has a long-running mail order business, as well as an account sales (library and corporate) department.

== Recognition and popular culture ==
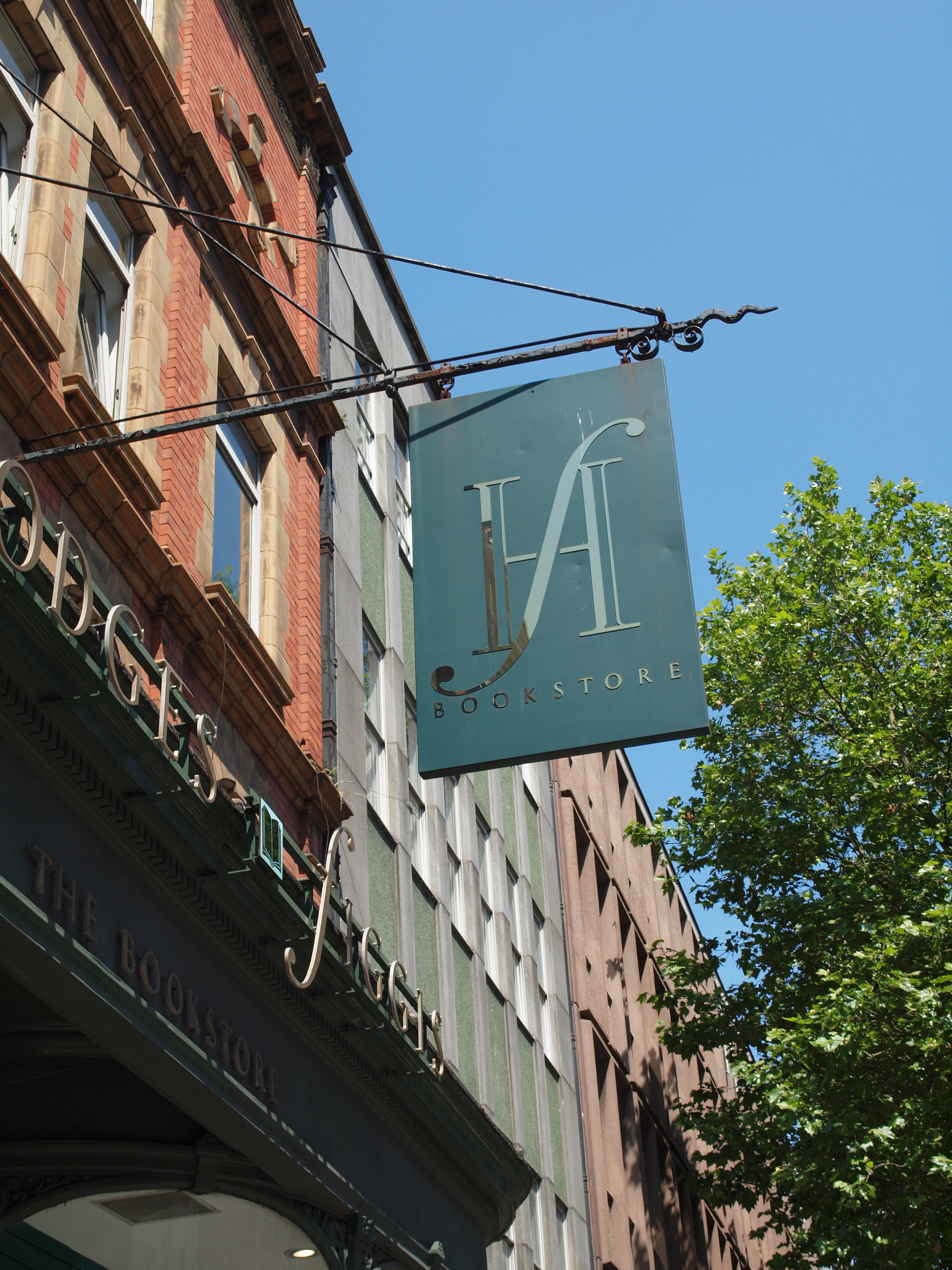
The sign outside Hodges Figgis

Hodges Figgis has been mentioned in The New York Times and The Wall Street Journal, as well as in popular works of fiction such as James Joyce's Ulysses, Sally Rooney's Conversations with Friends and John Boyne's The Heart's Invisible Furies, and in a poem by Paul Durcan.

A volume of new writing by contemporary Irish writers, with an appendix on the shop's history, was published to commemorate Hodges Figgis's 250th anniversary in 2018, with the proceeds going to charitable literacy works. It featured a wide variety of forms, by 250 authors, playwrights and poets, over more than 700 pages, and cover artwork by Pauline Bewick; all contributors, and the editor, gave their efforts at no charge.

== See also ==
- Hodges Figgis Trophy
