= Pentos =

British holding company (1972-1995)

Pentos plc was a British holding company that operated between 1972 and 1995 and was best known for its ownership of the Dillons, Wilding Office Equipment, Ryman and Athena retail brands.

Pentos was established from a shell company by Terry Maher in January 1972 as a vehicle for his investment in the publisher Marshall, Morgan & Scott and the joinery company Austin Hall Group. By May 1972 Pentos had acquired a listing on the London Stock Exchange through its reverse takeover of the listed Cape Town & District Gas, Light & Coke company.

Pentos entered the retail trade through its purchase of the Birmingham-based Hudsons Bookshops chain by its subsidiary Marshall, Morgan & Scott in 1972. It bought Dillon's University Bookshop in London in 1977, and the Dublin-based Hodges Figgis bookshop in 1978.

Pentos' shares were suspended and the company went into receivership on 1 March 1995.

== Bibliography ==
- Maher, Terry (1994). Against My Better Judgement: Adventures in the City and in the Book Trade. London: Sinclair Stevenson. ISBN 1-85619-518-X.
