= Economy of Reading, Berkshire =

Reading is an important commercial centre in Southern England and is often referred to as the commercial capital of the Thames Valley. The town hosts the headquarters of British companies and the UK offices of foreign multinationals, as well as being a major retail centre.

Whilst located close enough to London to be sometimes regarded as part of the London commuter belt, Reading is a net inward destination for commuters. During the morning peak period, there are some 30,000 inward arrivals in the town, compared to 24,000 departures.

== Industry ==
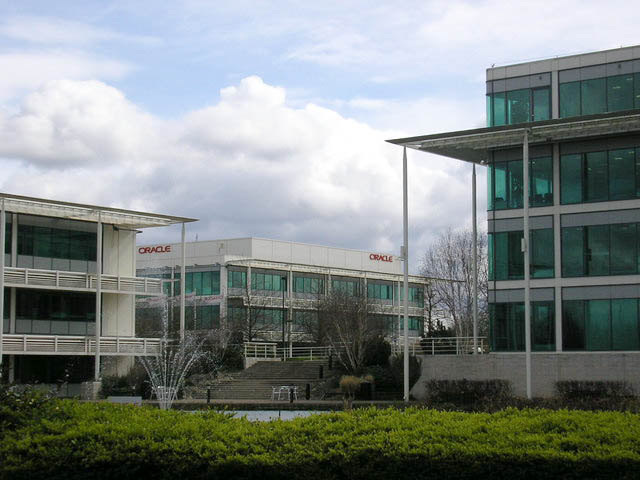
The Oracle Corporation campus in Thames Valley Business Park

Reading has a significant historical involvement in the information technology industry, largely as a result of the early presence in the town of sites of International Computers Limited and Digital. Whilst both these companies have been swallowed by other groups, their respective descendants in Fujitsu and Hewlett-Packard both still have local operations. More recently Microsoft and Oracle have established multi-building campuses in the town. Procter & Gamble also has an innovation centre in the town, which is active in the production of Gillette razors, and is the second largest in the world of its kind.

Other technology companies with a significant presence in the town include Huawei Technologies, Access IS, Agilent Technologies, Audio & Design (Recording) Ltd, Bang & Olufsen, Cisco, Ericsson, Harris Corporation, Intel, Nvidia, Sage, Sagem Orga, SGI, Symantec, Symbol Technologies, Verizon Business, Virgin Media, Websense, Xansa (now Steria), and Xerox.

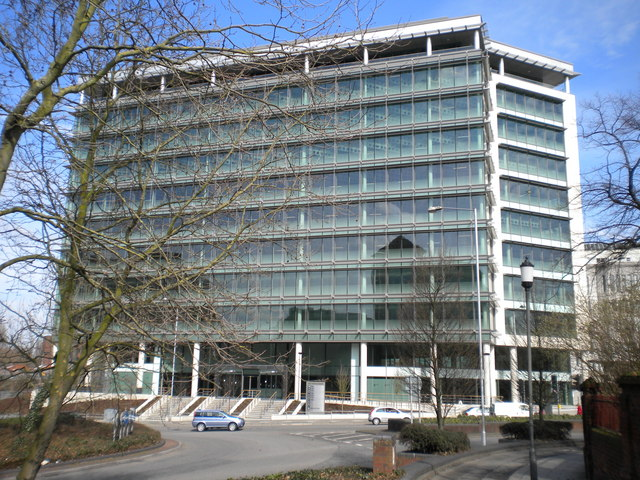
One Reading Central, Yell HQ

The financial company ING Direct had its headquarters in Reading, as does the directories company Yell Group and the natural gas major BG Group. The insurance company Prudential has an administration centre in the town, whilst PepsiCo and Holiday Inn have offices. Like most major cities, Reading has offices of the Big Four accounting firms Deloitte, PwC, Ernst & Young and KPMG.

These companies are distributed around Reading, including in business parks just inside or outside the borough boundary. Prudential and Yell, together with most of the accountancy companies, have their offices in central Reading. Thames Valley Business Park is home to the Microsoft and Oracle campuses, as well as BG Group and ING Direct. Green Park Business Park is home to Huawei Technologies, Symantec, Logica and Cisco, whilst the nearby Reading International Business Park is home to Verizon Business. Winnersh Triangle Business Park is home to technology companies, whilst Arlington Park is home to Synopsys, Honda R&D and pSemi.

Examples of long-standing industrial companies originating in Reading include Kee Klamp.

== Retail ==
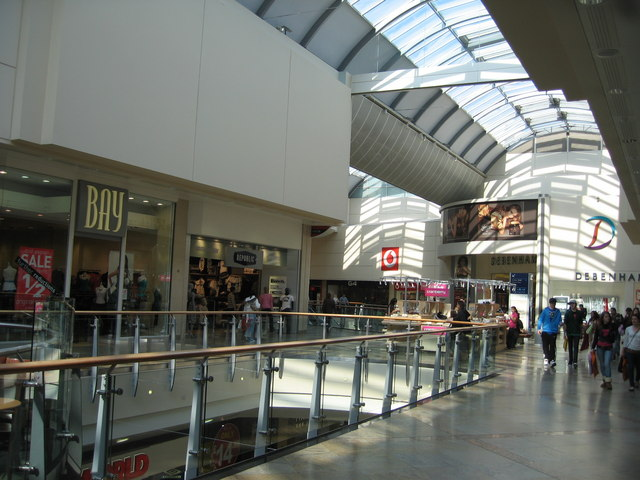
The upper level of The Oracle

Reading town centre is a major shopping centre. The primary catchment area for the town centre (the area for which the centre attracts the largest single flow of generated expenditure) for non-bulky comparison goods extends as far as Goring-on-Thames, Henley-on-Thames, Pangbourne and Wokingham. The secondary catchment area (the area where the centre attracts 10% or more of generated expenditure) also includes Ascot, Bracknell, Sandhurst, Camberley, Didcot, Farnborough, Fleet, High Wycombe, Maidenhead, Newbury, Slough, Tadley, Thatcham, Wallingford and Windsor. In 2007 an independent poll placed Reading as one of the top ten retail destinations in the UK.

The principal town centre shopping area is around Broad Street, which was pedestrianised in 1995. Broad Street is anchored at its east and west ends respectively by The Oracle and Broad Street Mall enclosed shopping centres. In 2007 14.4 million people visited the covered part of the Oracle shopping centre.

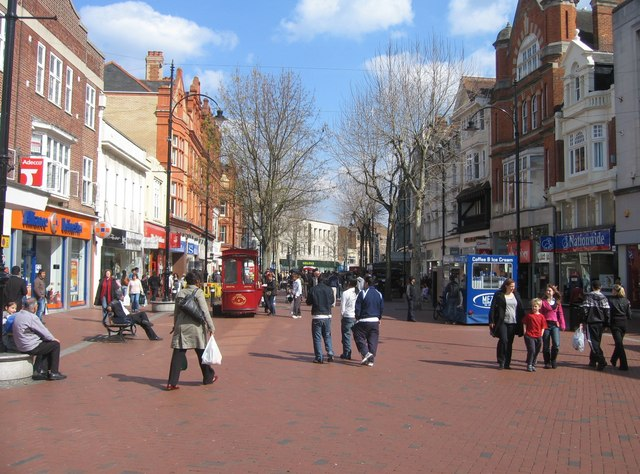
Broad Street looking east

There are two major department stores in Reading: John Lewis & Partners (formerly known as Heelas),. There are also branches of chain stores, including Virgin Media, Boots, H&M, Marks and Spencers, Next, Primark and W H Smith. The booksellers Waterstone's has a large branch in the former Methodist Chapel on Broad Street.

Besides the two major shopping malls, Reading has the smaller Harris Arcade and King's Walk, which contain smaller specialist stores and restaurants. An older form of retail facility is represented by Union Street, popularly known as Smelly Alley, due to the former presence of many open-fronted fishmongers and butchers. The occupancy has shifted towards major retail chains, although a few of independent shops, including a fishmonger and butcher remain.

A farmers' market operates on two Saturdays a month at the cattle market.
