= List of places named after Queen Victoria =

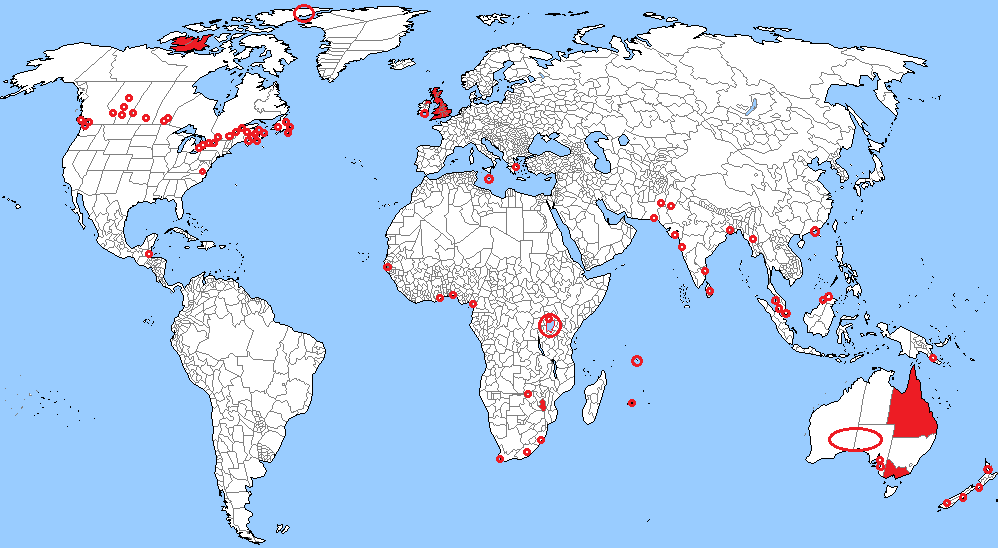
Places named after Queen Victoria (in red)

Many places which were once in the former British Empire were named after the British monarch who reigned over it for the greater part of its most dominant period, Queen Victoria. As such, Victoria is one of the most commemorated individuals in place-names around the world.

Other places that have the name "Victoria", without the association with Queen Victoria, tend to be derived from the Spanish-language word for 'victory'; see the Victoria disambiguation.

== Commonwealth ==
=== Australia ===
==== Australian Capital Territory ====
- Queen Victoria Terrace, Canberra

==== New South Wales ====
- Lake Victoria
- Queens Park, the urban park
  - Queens Park, the Sydney suburb adjacent to the urban park
- Queen's Square, Sydney
- Queen Victoria Building, Sydney
- Statue of Queen Victoria, Sydney
- Victoria Bridge, Penrith
- Victoria Bridge, Picton
- Victoria Road, Sydney

==== Queensland ====
- State of Queensland
- Queen Street, Brisbane

==== South Australia ====
- Great Victoria Desert (also in Western Australia)
- Lake Alexandrina
- Victoria Square, Adelaide
- Victoria Park, Adelaide

==== Tasmania ====
- Queen Victoria Museum & Art Gallery, Launceston
- Queenstown, West Coast
- Queen River, West Coast
- Queens Beach, Hobart (also known as Bellerive Beach)
- Victoria Bridge, Devonport
- Victoria Bridge, Launceston
- Victoria Dock (Hobart)

==== Victoria ====
- State of Victoria
- Lake Victoria
- Lake Victoria (one of the Gippsland Lakes)
- Queen's College (University of Melbourne)
- Queens Park, Moonee Ponds
- Queen Victoria Gardens, Melbourne
- Queen Victoria Hospital, Melbourne
- Queen Victoria Market, Melbourne
- Victoria Dock, Melbourne
- Victoria Street, Melbourne

==== Western Australia ====
- Great Victoria Desert (also in South Australia)
- Queen Victoria Street, Fremantle

=== The Bahamas ===
- Queen's Staircase, Nassau, The Bahamas

=== Bangladesh ===
- Comilla Victoria College, Comilla (now Comilla Victoria Government College)
- Victoria Public Library, Natore
- Victoria Road, Tangail
- Narail Government Victoria College, Narail

=== Barbados ===
- Queen Victoria Road, Bridgetown

=== Belize ===
- Victoria Peak

=== Canada ===
During the process of Confederation, "Victorialand" and "Victorialia" were among the alternative suggestions to Canada as to what the name of the new Dominion should be.

==== Alberta ====
- Fort Victoria, Alberta
- Victoria Lake, Alberta
- Victoria Park, Edmonton, Alberta
- Victoria Park neighbourhood, Calgary, Alberta
- Victoria Peak, Alberta

==== British Columbia ====
- Victoria, British Columbia
- Victoria Avenue, Victoria, British Columbia
- Empress Hotel, Victoria, British Columbia
- Victoria Drive, Vancouver, British Columbia
- Queen Victoria Hospital, Revelstoke, British Columbia
- Victoria Peak, British Columbia

==== Manitoba ====
- Victoria, Manitoba
- Victoria Beach, Manitoba
- Victoria Park, Souris, Manitoba
- Victoria Hospital, Winnipeg, Manitoba
- Victoria and Albert School, Winnipeg

==== New Brunswick ====
- Victoria County, New Brunswick
- Victoria Corner, New Brunswick
- Victoria Park, Moncton, New Brunswick

==== Newfoundland and Labrador ====
- Victoria, Newfoundland
- Victoria Lake, Newfoundland and Labrador
- Victoria Park, St John's, Newfoundland and Labrador

==== Nova Scotia ====
- Victoria County, Cape Breton, Nova Scotia
- New Victoria, Cape Breton, Nova Scotia
- Victoria Park, Truro, Nova Scotia
- Victoria Beach, Nova Scotia
- The Victoria Theatre, Halifax, Nova Scotia
- Victoria Building @ the QEII Health Sciences Centre, Halifax, Nova Scotia
- Victoria Park / Victoria Road, Halifax, Nova Scotia
- Victoria Road, Dartmouth, Nova Scotia

==== Ontario ====
- Queen Street, Toronto
- Victoria Street, Toronto
- Victoria Park Avenue, Toronto
- Queen Victoria Park, Niagara Falls, Ontario
- Queen's Park, Toronto
- Victoria Street (N and S), Kitchener, Ontario
- Victoria Street, London, Ontario
- Victoria Avenue, Windsor, Ontario
- Victoria University, University of Toronto
- Queen Victoria PS, Toronto
- Royal Victoria Regional Health Centre, Barrie
- Stroud, Ontario, previously called Victoria
- Victoria Gardens Long Term Care, Hamilton
- Victoria Island (Ottawa River)
- Lake Victoria, Ontario

==== Prince Edward Island ====
- Victoria, Prince Edward Island
- Victoria Park, Charlottetown, Prince Edward Island

==== Quebec ====
- Victoriaville, Quebec
- Royal Victoria Hospital, Montreal, Quebec
- Square Victoria, Montreal
- Victoria Bridge, Montreal
- Victoria Avenue, Montreal
- Victoria Park/Parc Victoria, Quebec City, Quebec

==== Saskatchewan ====
- Regina, Saskatchewan
- Victoria Park, Regina Saskatchewan
- Victoria Hospital, Prince Albert, Saskatchewan
- Victoria School, Kamsack, Saskatchewan
- Victoria Avenue, Saskatoon, Saskatchewan
- Victoria Avenue, Regina

==== Territories ====
- Victoria Island, Nunavut and Northwest Territories
- Victoria and Albert Mountains, Ellesmere Island, Nunavut

=== Ghana ===
- Victoriaborg, neighborhood of Accra

=== India ===
- Empress Botanical Garden, Pune
- Victoria Dock, Mumbai; part of the Bombay Port Trust.
- Victoria Hospital (Bangalore Medical College), Bangalore.
- Victoria School, Kurseong, West Bengal.
- Victoria Memorial, Kolkata
  - Victoria metro station
- Victoria Terrace, Kolkata
- Victoria Avenue, Hiranandani Meadows, Mumbai
- Queensgate, Hiranandani Estate, Mumbai
- Queensway, Hiranandani Estate, Mumbai
- Victorian Mews, Hiranandani Gardens, Mumbai
- Victoria Road, Bangalore
- Victoria Public Hall, Chennai
- Victoria Park, Bhavnagar
- Victoria Memorial Indoor Hall, Etawah
- Victoria Park, Etawah
- Queen Victoria Girls Inter College, Agra
- Victoria Town Hall, Coimbatore
- Ranigunj, Secunderabad.

=== Jamaica ===
- Victoria Avenue, Kingston
- The Victoria Jubilee Hospital, Kingston

=== Kenya ===
- Lake Victoria

=== Malaysia ===
- Victoria, Labuan, the capital of the Malaysian Federal Territory of Labuan, an island off the north coast of Borneo
- Victoria Institution, an elite secondary school, Kuala Lumpur
- Victoria Bridge, Malaysia, one of the oldest single track railway bridge in the country located in Karai, Perak
- Victoria International College, a private higher education institution, Kuala Lumpur
- Queen Victoria Jubilee Clock Tower, King Edward Place, George Town, Penang
- Victoria Pier, the jetty of Penang
- Victoria Park, a park in Ipoh, Perak
- Victoria Club of Selangor and Kuala Lumpur, a private club in Kuala Lumpur
- Victoria Fountain, a Nouveau-inspired fountain in Merdeka Square, Kuala Lumpur
- Victoria Memorial Fountain, a landmark fountain in Melaka town square
- Lebuh Victoria, a famous street in George Town, Penang
- Queensbay, a development area of Penang which houses Queensbay Mall, one of Southeast Asia's largest shopping malls
- Jalan Queen, a street famous for its many hawker's stalls in the Pasir Pinji area of Ipoh, Perak
- Victoria Hotel, a landmark of the island of Labuan, Borneo
- Ladang Victoria, a rubber plantation area in Padang Serai, Kedah
- Victoria Pahang Estate, an estate area in the state of Pahang
- Jalan Victoria, a road in Nibong Tebal, mainland Penang
- Lorong Victoria, a road in Tawau, Sabah
- Puncak Victoria, a peak on Mount Kinabalu, Sabah

=== Malta ===
- Victoria, capital of the island of Gozo, also known by its original name Rabat
- Victoria Gate, a city gate in Valletta
- Victoria Lines, a line of fortifications in northern Malta

=== Mauritius ===
- Queen Victoria, Mauritius, a village in the district of Flacq, Mauritius
- Victoria Hospital, Candos, Quatre Bornes
- Victoria Bus Terminal, Port Louis

=== New Zealand ===
==== North Island ====
- Victoria River, Northland
- Victoria Park, Auckland
- Mount Victoria, Auckland
- Victoria Street, Auckland
- Queen Street, Auckland
- Victoria Street, Hamilton
- Victoria Bridge, Hamilton
- Victoria Bridge, Cambridge
- Victoria Park, Feilding
- Victoria Esplanade, Palmerston North
- Victoria Avenue, Palmerston North
- Mount Victoria (Manawatu-Wanganui)
- Victoria Park, Foxton
- Victoria University of Wellington, Wellington
- Mount Victoria (Wellington hill)
- Mount Victoria (Wellington suburb)

==== South Island ====
- Mount Victoria (Marlborough)
- Mount Victoria (Tasman)
- Victoria Square, Christchurch
- Victoria Street (Christchurch)
- Victoria Park, Christchurch
- Lake Alexandrina, Canterbury
- Victoria Lake, Canterbury
- Victoria Range, Tasman-West Coast
- Victoria Glacier, West Coast
- Queens Gardens, Dunedin
- Queenstown
- Victoria Bridge, Otago
- Victoria Hill, Otago
- Victoria Channel, Otago Harbour
- Lake Victoria, Southland

==== Ross Dependency ====
- Victoria Land, Ross Dependency

=== Nigeria ===
- Victoria Island, Lagos
- Victoria Garden City, Lagos
- Victoria Cemetery, Lagos

=== Pakistan ===
- Empress Market, Karachi
- Bahawal-Victoria Hospital Bahawalpur
- Victoria Tower Jacobabad
- Haranpur (Victoria) Bridge
- Victoria Memorial Hall, Sibi, Balochistan

=== Papua New Guinea ===
- Mount Victoria

=== Seychelles ===
- Victoria

=== Singapore ===
- Empress Place, Singapore
- Empress Place Building, Singapore
- Queen Street
- Queen's Avenue
- Queen's Close
- Queen's Crescent
- Queen's Road
- Queensway, Singapore
- Victoria Junior College also known as VJC or Victoria JC, an elite university preparatory institution
- Victoria Lane
- Victoria Park Close
- Victoria Street
- Victoria School
- Victoria Theatre and Concert Hall

=== South Africa ===
- Victoria Street, Durban
- Victoria Embankment, Durban
- Victoria & Alfred Waterfront, Cape Town
- Victoria Street, Somerset West, Western Cape
- Victoria Mall, Caledon, Western Cape
- Victoria Road, Cape Town
- Victoria Hall, Maritzburg College, Pietermaritzburg, KwaZulu-Natal
- Victoria Walk, Woodstock, Cape Town, Western Cape
- Victoria West, Northern Cape

=== Sri Lanka ===
- Victoria Dam
- Victoria Park, Nuwara Eliya

=== Tanzania ===
- Lake Victoria

=== Trinidad and Tobago ===
- Victoria Avenue, Port-of-Spain
- Victoria County, Trinidad and Tobago
- Victoria Street, San Fernando
- Victoria Square, Port-of-Spain
- Queen's Park Oval
- Queen's Park Savannah

=== Uganda ===
- Lake Victoria
- Victoria Nile
- Victoria University

=== United Kingdom ===
Note: this is only a small sample of the hundreds of locations in the United Kingdom with the name 'Victoria'.

==== England ====
- Queen Victoria Square, Hull
- Queen Hotel, Chester
- Queen Victoria Road, Newcastle-upon-Tyne
- Queen Victoria Street, London
- Queen Victoria Street, Reading
- Queensmere, Wimbledon Common
- Royal Victoria Country Park, Netley
- Royal Victoria Dock, London
- Royal Victoria Infirmary, Newcastle-upon-Tyne
- Southend Victoria, Southend-on-sea
- Victoria and Albert Museum, London
- Victoria Avenue, Wellington, Shropshire
- Victoria Bridge, Datchet
- Victoria Bridge, Hereford
- Victoria Embankment, London
- Victoria Gardens and Victoria Square, Truro, Cornwall
- Victoria Gate, Hyde Park
- Victoria Gate, Kew Gardens
- Victoria Hall, Kidsgrove, Staffordshire
- Victoria Park, Bournemouth
- Victoria Park, East London
- Victoria Park, Stretford
- Victoria Park, Tipton
- Victoria Place, Richmond upon Thames
- Victoria Quadrant, Weston-super-Mare
- Victoria Quays, Sheffield
- Victoria Road, Brighton
- Victoria Road, Cambridge
- Victoria Road, Canterbury
- Victoria Road, Chelmsford, Essex
- Victoria Road, Dagenham, Essex
- Victoria Road, Diss, Norfolk
- Victoria Road, Halton, Cheshire
- Victoria Road and Victoria Grove, Kensington, London
- Victoria Road, Kilburn, London
- Victoria Road, London
- Victoria Road, Lowestoft, Suffolk
- Victoria Road, Oxford
- Victoria Road, Plymouth
- Victoria Road, South Ruislip, London
- Victoria Road, Stretford, Manchester
- Victoria Road, Swindon, Wiltshire
- Victoria Road, Tunbridge Wells, Kent
- Victoria Square, Birmingham, West Midlands
- Victoria Station, Manchester
- Victoria Street, Birmingham
- Victoria Street, London
- Victoria Shopping Centre, Southend-on-sea
- Victoria Tower, part of the Palace of Westminster
- Victoria Terrace, Leeds

==== Northern Ireland ====
- Queen Victoria Street, Belfast, Northern Ireland
- Great Victoria Street, Belfast, Northern Ireland
- Queen's University, Belfast
- Great Victoria Street railway station, Belfast
- Royal Victoria Hospital, Belfast
- Victoria College, Belfast
- Victoria Park, Belfast
- Victoria Road, Carrickfergus
- Victoria Square, Belfast

==== Scotland ====
- Glasgow Victoria Infirmary
- Victoria Park, Aberdeen
- Victoria Park, Dingwall
- Victoria Park, Glasgow
- Victoria Park Drive (North/South), Glasgow
- Victoria Road, Aberdeen
- Victoria Road, Ballater
- Victoria Road, Brora
- Victoria Road, Dundee
- Queen Street, Dundee
- Victoria Road, Dunoon
- Victoria Road, Fort William
- Victoria Road, Glasgow
- Victoria Road, Gourock
- Victoria Road, Helensburgh
- Victoria Road, Kirkcaldy
- Victoria Road, Leven, Fife
- Victoria Road, Lockerbie
- Victoria Road, North Berwick
- Victoria Road, Peterhead
- Victoria Road, Rutherglen
- Victoria Street, Dunfermline
- Victoria Street, Edinburgh
- Victoria Street, Fraserburgh
- Victoria Street, Galashiels
- Victoria Street, Kirkwall
- Victoria Street, Lanark
- Victoria Street, Newton Stewart
- Victoria Street, Perth
- Victoria Street, Rutherglen
- Victoria Tower, Greenock

==== Wales ====
- Victoria, Newport

=== Crown Dependencies ===
==== Isle of Man ====
- Victoria Pier, Douglas
- Victoria Road, Douglas
- Victoria Road, Onchan
- Victoria Road, Castletown
- Victoria Road School, Castletown
- Victoria Street, Douglas

==== Jersey ====
- Victoria Avenue (Jersey)
- Victoria Road (Jersey)
- Victoria Street (Jersey)
- Victoria Park (Jersey)
- Victoria College, Jersey Victoria College, St Helier, Jersey

=== Zambia ===
- Victoria Falls

== Outside the Commonwealth ==
Burma, Hong Kong, Ireland and Zimbabwe were within the British Empire at the time many of the listed places were named. Hong Kong and Zimbabwe ceased to be members of the Commonwealth of Nations in 1997 and 2003, respectively.

=== Argentina ===
- Victoria, Buenos Aires Province

=== Burma/Myanmar ===
- Mount Victoria (Nat Ma Taung)

=== Chile ===
- Ascensor Reina Victoria, Valparaíso
- Hotel Reina Victoria, Valparaíso

=== France ===
- Avenue de la Reine Victoria, Biarritz
- Avenue Reine Victoria, Nice
- Excelsior Régina Palace, Nice
- Avenue Victoria, Paris

=== Germany ===
- Viktoriastraße, Hanover
- Victoriastadt, Berlin

=== Greece ===
- Victoria Square in Athens
- Victoria metro station on the Athens Metro, situated under the aforementioned square

=== Hong Kong ===
Hong Kong was a British colony from 1841 until 1997.

- Jubilee Street
- Queen's Pier
- Queen's Road
- Queensway
- Queen Victoria Street
- Queen Street
- Statue Square
- Tang Siu Kin Victoria Government Secondary School
- Victoria Gap
- Victoria Harbour
- Victoria Park
- Victoria Park Road
- Victoria Peak
- Victoria Prison
- Victoria Road
- Queen's College, Hong Kong
- Victoria Park Swimming Pool

=== Ireland ===
- Victoria Cross, Cork
- Victoria Mills, Cork
- Victoria Lodge, Cork
- Victoria Quay, Cork
- Victoria Street, Cork
- Victoria Avenue, Cork
- Victoria Road, Cork
- Victoria Street, Dublin
- Victoria Quay, Dublin
- Victoria Place, Galway City
- Victoria Bridge, Kildare

=== Switzerland ===
- Victoria Hall, concert hall in Geneva

=== United States ===
- Victoria, Kansas
- Victoria, Virginia, founded 1906
- Lake Victoria, Michigan
- Lake Victoria, Minnesota

=== Zimbabwe ===
- Victoria Falls
- (Fort) Victoria High School, Masvingo
- Victoria Falls, Zimbabwe
- Victoria Falls National Park

== Former places ==
=== Australia ===
==== South Australia ====
- Electoral district of Victoria

=== Bangladesh ===
- Victoria Park, Dhaka (now Bahadur Shah Park)

=== Cameroon ===
- Limbe, was known as Victoria until 1982

=== The Gambia ===
- Royal Victoria Teaching Hospital, Banjul (since 2013 Edward Francis Small Teaching Hospital)

=== Hong Kong ===
- Victoria City

=== India ===
- Victoria Terminus (now Chhatrapati Shivaji Terminus))
- Victoria Jubilee Technological Institute, Mumbai (now Veermata Jijabai Technological Institute)
- Victoria Gardens, Mumbai (now Jijamata Udyaan)
- Victoria and Albert Museum, Mumbai (now Dr. Bhau Daji Lad Museum)
- Victoria Memorial, Alfred Park, Prayagraj
- Victoria Hall Museum, Udaipur (now Raajkiya Saraswati Bhavan Saarvajanik Mandal Pustakalya)

=== Ireland ===
- Queen's College, Cork, former name of University College Cork
- Queenstown, former name of Cobh, County Cork

=== Isle of Man ===
- Victoria Road Prison, Douglas (demolished)

=== Myanmar ===
- Lake Victoria, Rangoon (now Inya Lake, Yangon)

=== Pakistan ===
- Victoria Road, Karachi. (renamed Abdullah Haroon Road)
- Queen's Road, Karachi (now Moulvi Tamizuddin (M.T.) Khan Road)
- Victoria Museum (now defunct), Karachi

=== Sierra Leone ===
- Victoria Park, Freetown (since mid-2017 Freetown Amusement Park)

=== South Africa ===
- Queenstown, town in Eastern Cape province (renamed Komani in 2016)

=== Sri Lanka ===
- Victoria Park, Colombo (now Viharamahadevi Park)
- Victoria Bridge (demolished)

=== United Kingdom ===
==== England ====
- Victoria Bridge, London, built in 1851-8, demolished in 1934 and replaced with the present Chelsea Bridge
- Victoria Road, Battersea, London (leading to the bridge mentioned above), later renamed Queen's Road and now called Queenstown Road

==== Scotland ====
- Royal Victoria Hospital, Edinburgh (demolished by a fire)

=== Zimbabwe ===
- Fort Victoria (now Masvingo)
- Victoria Province (now Masvingo Province)
- Queen Victoria Museum (now Zimbabwe Museum of Human Sciences)

== See also ==
- Queen Victoria
- Queen Victoria (disambiguation)
- Queen Victoria Street (disambiguation)
- Victoria (disambiguation)
- Victoria Avenue (disambiguation)
- Victoria Street (disambiguation)
- Royal eponyms in Canada
