= Queen Victoria Street =

Queen Victoria Street may refer to:

- Queen Victoria Street, Fremantle, Western Australia
- Queen Victoria Street, Hong Kong
- Queen Victoria Street, London
- Queen Victoria Street, Reading, Berkshire

== See also ==
- List of places named after Queen Victoria
- Victoria Avenue (disambiguation)
- Victoria Street (disambiguation)
