= Anthony Howard (journalist) =

British journalist, broadcaster and writer

Anthony Howard CBE
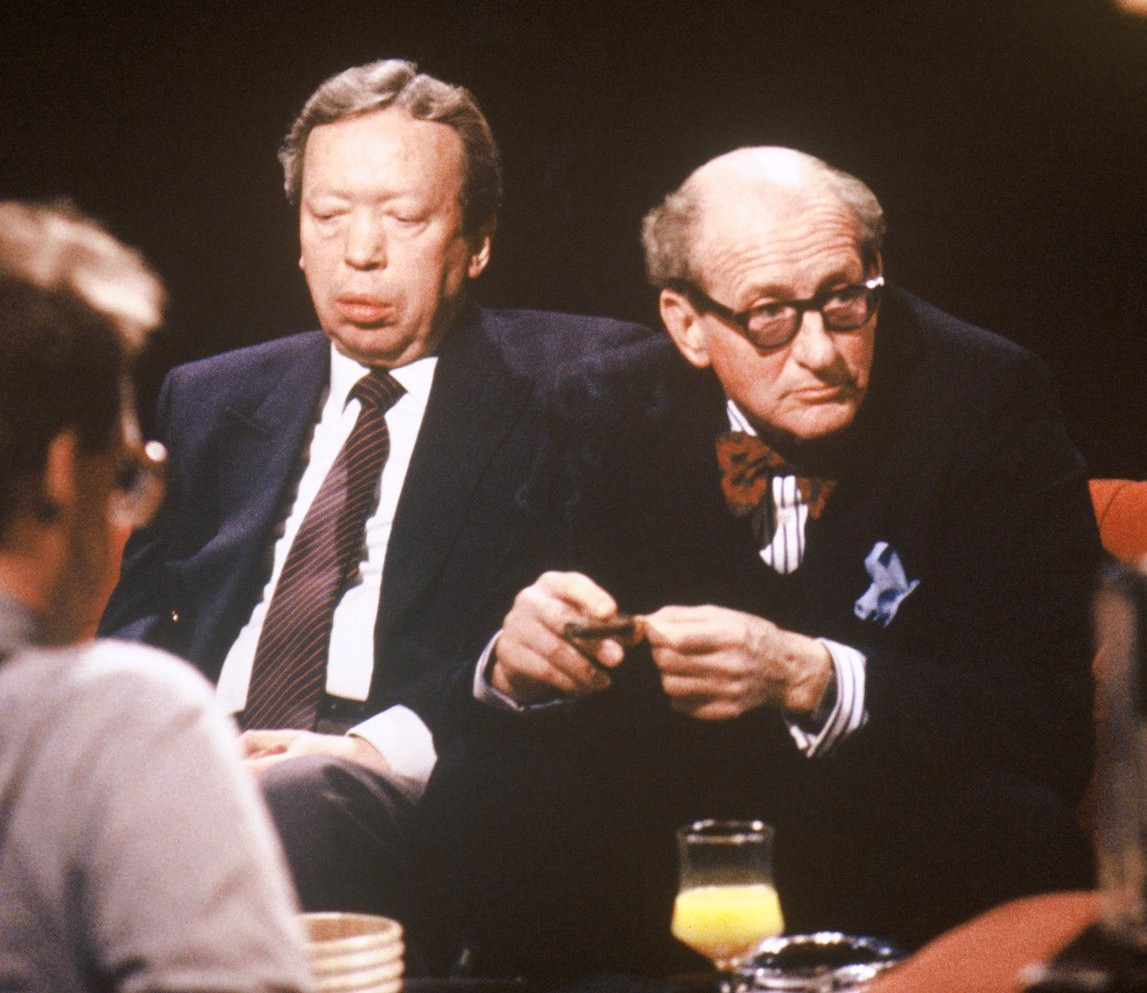
- Appearing (left) with Lord Lambton on television programme After Dark in 1991
- Born: Anthony Michell Howard; 12 February 1934; London, England
- Died: 19 December 2010 (aged 76); London, England
- Education: Christ Church, Oxford
- Occupations: Journalist; editor; biographer
- Years active: 1958–2005
- Employers: Reynolds News (1958–1959); The Guardian (1959–1965); The Sunday Times (1965–1966); The Observer (1969–1972; 1981–1988); New Statesman (1970–1978); The Times (1990–2005)
- Spouse: Carol Anne Gaynor (m. 1965)

Anthony Michell Howard, CBE (12 February 1934 – 19 December 2010) was a British journalist, broadcaster and writer. He was the editor of the New Statesman and The Listener and the deputy editor of The Observer. He selected the passages used in The Crossman Diaries, a book of entries taken from Richard Crossman's The Diaries of a Cabinet Minister.

== Early life ==
Howard was born in London, the son of Canon (William) Guy Howard (1902–1981), a Church of England clergyman (at the time of his son's birth, priest in charge at Christ Church, Victoria Road, Kensington), and Janet Rymer (1904–1983; née Hogg). He studied at Purton Stoke School at Kintbury in Berkshire and Highgate Junior School, followed by Westminster School and Christ Church at the University of Oxford, where he studied jurisprudence. In 1954 he was chairman of the Oxford University Labour Club and, the following year, President of the Oxford Union.

Howard planned a career as a barrister and was called to the Bar from the Inner Temple in 1956. Meanwhile, he was fulfilling his National service obligations in the army, during which he saw active service in the Royal Fusiliers during the Suez War. He wrote (initially anonymously) articles for the New Statesman about his reluctant involvement in the conflict, an action for which he was almost court-martialled.

== First posts in journalism ==
Despite this early experience as a freelance contributor, he "stumbled" into his career as a journalist in 1958, beginning on Reynolds News as a political correspondent. Howard moved to the Manchester Guardian in 1959. The following year he was awarded a Harkness Fellowship to study in the United States, though he remained on the Guardian’s staff.

Howard was political correspondent of the New Statesman from 1961 until 1964. An admirer of Labour leader Hugh Gaitskell during this period, he was a strong advocate of the democratic process:

I strongly believe that people should have the right to elect their own rulers and for a long time I was deeply affronted by what the Conservative Party did and never more affronted than when Alec Douglas-Home became leader of the Conservative Party. That seemed to me to be an Etonian fix organised by Harold Macmillan.

In January 1965 Howard joined The Sunday Times as its Whitehall correspondent, reporting on the activities of senior civil servants. He saw his Whitehall brief as being in advance of the journalistic practices of that time. Cabinet Ministers were instructed by Prime Minister Harold Wilson's private secretary not to co-operate with Howard. Civil servants received similar instructions. Phillip Knightley reported a conversation with Howard in 2003 in which Howard had said Wilson "understood I was only trying to do my job but he had a job to do, too, and his was more important than mine. He made it very plain that all conventional sources of information would remain shut until I was willing to return to the cosy but essentially sham game of being a political correspondent." Wilson is thought by journalist John Simpson to have had a preference for secrecy and to have been fearful that such a practice would give his enemies and rivals a potential outlet.

Howard, however, was soon invited to become The Observer’s chief Washington correspondent, serving in the role from 1966 to 1969, later contributing a political column (1971–72). During his period in America he made regular contributions to The World at One on Radio 4. "It got to where I was almost the World at One Washington correspondent", he once remarked. He was, though, absent from his post when President Johnson announced he would not seek re-election in the Presidential election of 1968, which did not help relations with David Astor, Observer editor at the time.

== Editorial roles ==
As editor of the New Statesman (1972–78), succeeding Richard Crossman, whose deputy he had been (1970–72), he appointed Robin Cook as the magazine's parliamentary adviser in 1974 (Cook also contributed articles), James Fenton, Christopher Hitchens, and Martin Amis as literary editor in 1977. Future New Statesman editor Peter Wilby, for whom Howard was a mentor, was a staff member during this period.

Under Howard's editorship the magazine published a rare non-British contributor: Gabriel García Márquez in March 1974, on the overthrow of Salvador Allende's elected government in Chile the previous September. Perhaps out of a sense of balance, he featured a series of critiques of the British Left, by the magazine's former editor Paul Johnson, a drinking companion and friend of Howard's, whose political rightward drift was well advanced by then. He also employed Auberon Waugh as a columnist. Howard was unable to halt the magazine's fall in circulation, however. He then edited The Listener for two years (1979–81).

Howard was deputy editor of The Observer (1981–88), where one of his journalist protégés was the journalist and (later) novelist Robert Harris, whom he appointed as the newspaper's political correspondent. His professional relationship with the editor, Donald Trelford, ultimately broke down over allegations that Trelford had allowed the newspaper's proprietor Tiny Rowland to interfere in editorial content. After leaving The Observer, following an ill-fated editorial coup against Trelford, he was a reporter on Newsnight and Panorama (1989–92), having previously presented Channel Four's Face the Press (1982–85). According to Charter88 founder Anthony Barnett he opposed that organisation's petition, and helped run the official committee dedicated to commemorating the 300th anniversary of the Glorious Revolution in 1988.

== Later career ==
His last editorial positions before turning freelance were at The Times as Obituaries editor (1993–99), and chief political book reviewer (1990–2004), though he contributed opinion columns to the newspaper until September 2005, when his regular column was discontinued. Howard assisted his long-standing friend Michael Heseltine on his memoirs, Life in the Jungle: My Autobiography (2000), and later published an official biography, Basil Hume: The Monk Cardinal (2005).

== Personal life ==
Howard married Carol Anne Gaynor, a journalist, in 1965. He was the lover of Corinna Adam (former wife of journalist Neal Ascherson) for several decades, but did not leave his wife. Corinna Adam, also known by her married name, died in March 2012. At the time of his death, Howard lived between London and Ludlow.

Howard was appointed CBE in 1997. He died in London on 19 December 2010, aged 76, from complications of surgery for an aneurysm. Since 2013 the annual Anthony Howard Award has offered one young journalist two six-month paid placements on the politics desks of the New Statesman and The Times.

== Bibliography ==
- Richard Crossman (Anthony Howard, ed.; 1979) Diaries of a Cabinet Minister: Selections, 1964–70, Hamish Hamilton
- Philip French & Michael Sissons (1963) The Age of Austerity, Hodder & Stoughton [reprinted by Oxford University Press 1986 (contributed chapter "'We Are the Masters Now'", on the Attlee government) pp. 1–20)]
- Stephen Glover (ed; 1999) Secrets of the Press: Journalists on Journalism, Allen Lane (reprinted as The Penguin Book of Journalism: Secrets of the Press, Penguin, 2000; contributed chapter "Dealing with Mr Murdoch" pp. 260–271)
- Michael Heseltine (2000) Life in the Jungle: My Autobiography, Hodder & Stoughton [acknowledged assistance]
- Anthony Howard and Richard West (1965) The Making of the Prime Minister, Jonathan Cape [USA edition: The Road to Number 10 Macmillan 1965]
- Anthony Howard (1987) Rab: Life of R.A. Butler, Jonathan Cape
- Anthony Howard (1990) Crossman: The Pursuit of Power, Jonathan Cape
- Anthony Howard (ed) (1993) Lives Remembered: "Times" Obituaries, The Blewbury Press
- Anthony Howard (2005) Basil Hume: The Monk Cardinal. Headline Books ISBN 0-7553-1247-3
- John Raymond (ed) (1960) The Baldwin Age, Eyre & Spottiswoode [contributor]
- Anthony Howard tells his life story at Web of Stories

Media offices
Preceded by Richard Crossman	Editor of the New Statesman; 1972–1978	Succeeded by Bruce Page
Preceded by John Cole	Deputy Editor of The Observer; 1981–1988	Succeeded by Adrian Hamilton
