= Inderwick =

Inderwick is a surname. Notable people with the surname include:

- Frederick Inderwick (1836–1904), English lawyer, antiquarian, and politician
- John Inderwick (died 1867), English tobacco pipe maker and property developer
