= Henry Richard Tedder =

English librarian

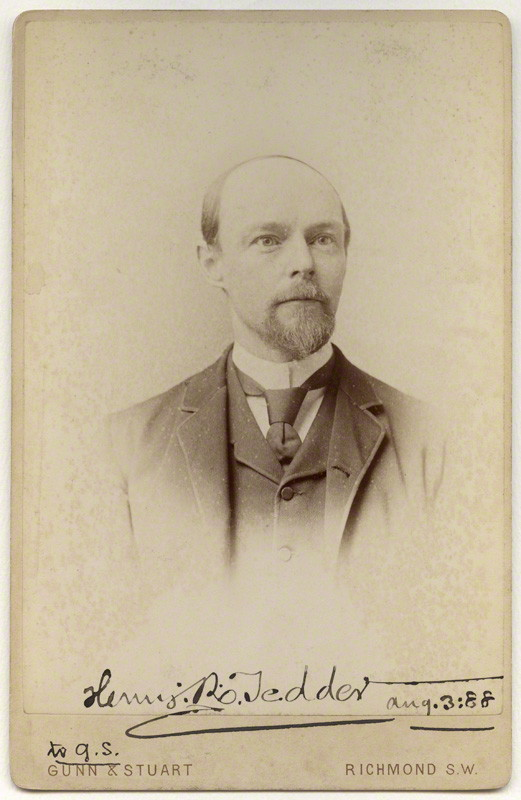
Tedder c. 1888

Henry Richard Tedder (25 June 1850 – 1 August 1924) was an English librarian. He was librarian of the Athenaeum Club, London, and was a founder of the Library Association.

== Life ==
Tedder was born in 1850 in Victoria Grove, Kensington, London, son of William Henry Tedder and his wife Elizabeth née Ferries. His brother Sir Arthur John Tedder, a civil servant, was the father of Arthur Tedder, 1st Baron Tedder.

From 1873 to 1874 he was librarian to John Dalberg-Acton, 1st Baron Acton, cataloguing his private collection of books. In 1874 he became assistant to Spencer Hall, librarian of the Athenaeum Club, London, of which Lord Acton was a member. Hall died in 1875 and Tedder became librarian, remaining in the post until retirement in 1914. From 1888 he was also secretary of the Athenaeum.

He had a part in the establishment of the Library Association; at its first meeting in 1877, Tedder and Edward Nicholson were appointed joint honorary secretaries and arranged the first conference of the Association later that year. He was treasurer from 1889, and president in 1897.

Tedder wrote many articles for the Dictionary of National Biography and for Inglis Palgrave's Dictionary of Political Economy. He was a committee member of the London Library from 1884 to 1909. In 1902 he was elected to the Royal Historical Society; he was its treasurer from 1904 until his death, and was vice-president in 1923.

He died at his home in Putney in 1924. An obituarist in The Times wrote that he "for over 50 years had been identified with libraries, and with the efforts that have been so constantly made since about the year 1877 to reduce the rules of the classification and arrangement of books to something like a science, and to improve the professional position of librarians."

== Family ==
He married in 1887 Alice Callan (1860–1915); he married in 1916 Violet Anns (1877–1954). A daughter and a son survived him.
