= Friars Walk =

Friars Walk may refer to:

- Friars Walk, Newport, shopping and leisure complex in Newport, South Wales
- Friars Walk, Reading, a derelict shopping centre in Reading, Berkshire
