= Victoria Street =

Victoria Street may refer to:

== Streets ==
=== Australia ===
- Victoria Street, Sydney
- Victoria Street railway station, New South Wales
- Victoria Street, Melbourne, Victoria
- Victoria Street railway station, Perth

=== Canada ===
- Victoria Street, Kitchener, Ontario; see Kitchener station
- Victoria Street, Toronto, Ontario
- Victoria Street, Kamloops, British Columbia

=== Kenya ===
- Victoria Street, (now Tom Mboya Street)

=== Malaysia ===
- Victoria Street, Penang; a street in George Town, Penang

=== New Zealand ===
- Victoria Street, Auckland
- Victoria Street, Christchurch

=== Singapore ===
- Victoria Street, Singapore

=== United Kingdom ===
- Victoria Street, Bristol, England; see Grade II listed buildings in Bristol § I–R
- Victoria Street, Edinburgh, Scotland
- Victoria Street, Liverpool, England
- Victoria Street, London, England
- Victoria Street, Paignton, England
- Victoria Street, Wolverhampton, England

== Other uses ==
- One of several adjacent streets connecting to Coronation Street on the television series of the same name

== See also ==
- List of places named after Queen Victoria
- Queen Victoria Street (disambiguation)
- Victoria (disambiguation)
- Victoria Avenue (disambiguation)
- Victoria Road
