= Broad Street Mall =

Large indoor shopping mall located in central Reading, England

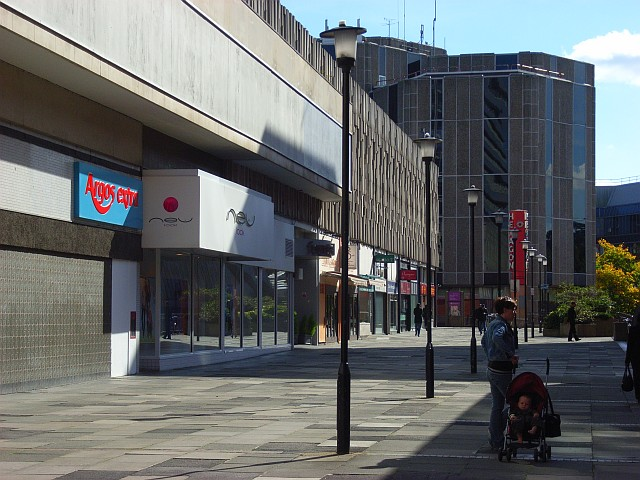
- Location: Reading, Berkshire, United Kingdom
- Coordinates: 51.454719°N 0.976174°W
- Opened: 1971; 55 years ago
- Developer: Moorgarth
- Manager: Steven Connolly
- Owner: Inception Reading SARL (2015)
- Num. of stores: 77
- Num. of anchor tenants: Reading Biscuit Factory & TK Maxx
- Floor area: 475,902 sq ft (44,212.7 m^{2})
- Floors: 2
- Parking: 720 total spaces 18 disabled bays
- Website: www.broadstreetmall.com

Broad Street Mall, previously known as the Butts Centre, is a large indoor shopping centre located in central Reading, England. There is a large multi-storey car park with direct access to the first floor of the centre. It is close to The Hexagon theatre and the offices of Reading Borough Council.

== History ==
Plans for the shopping centre were made by the Reading Borough Council in 1956, however it took more than a decade to find a suitable site and buy it. The centre was originally known as the Butts Centre, and was named after the adjacent St Mary's Butts. The current name relates to Reading's principal pedestrian shopping street, Broad Street, and the centre is situated at the west end of the street. It was opened in 1971. The centre was purchased by Doughty Hanson & Co in June 2001 and sold in March 2004. During this period they implemented a business strategy to update and refurbish the shopping centre to modern standards. During this time footfall increased 50% and net operating profits increased 38%.

== Redevelopment and residential plans ==
Various proposals have since been put forward to redevelop parts of the Broad Street Mall site for residential housing. The site was bought by AEW, who then submitted revised plans to Reading Borough Council, which were officially approved. The plans involve transforming the south of the site to hold over 600 apartments across four buildings (ranging up to 30 storeys) alongside integrated commercial, retail space, and other improvements.

== Other facilities ==
There are public toilets a Post Office and a NHS walk-in health centre. In 2019, the walk-in centre was expanded due to its busy nature with £505,000 of funding from the NHS. In September 2020, Co-Space Reading opened which offers a working environment for local businesses

== See also ==
- The Oracle, another shopping centre nearby.
