= 18 Victoria Grove =

Grade II listed house in Kensington, London, England

Coordinates: 51.499214°N 0.184883°W

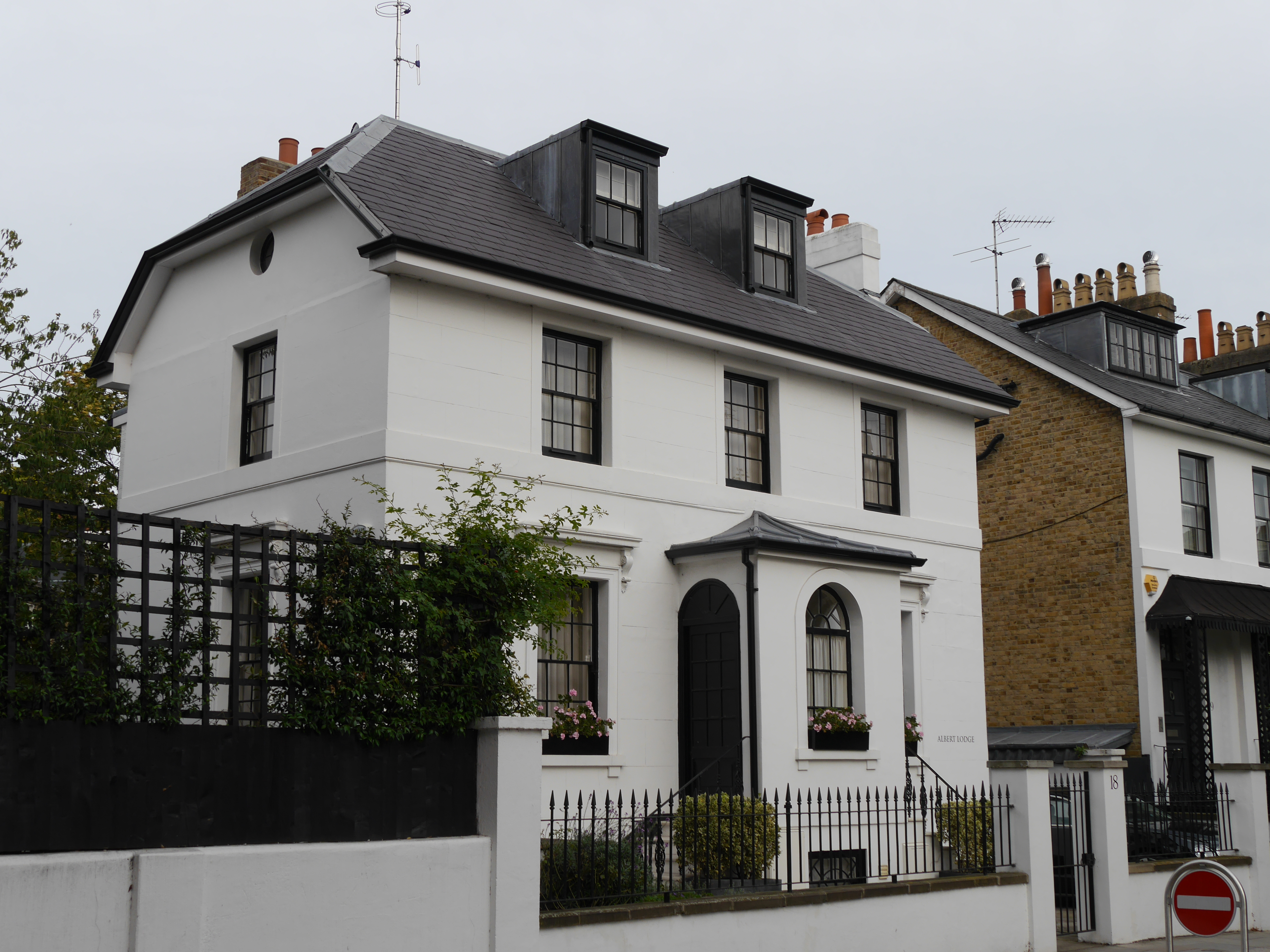
18 Victoria Grove, 2016

18 Victoria Grove, also known as Albert Lodge, is a Grade II listed house in Victoria Grove, Kensington, London W8, built in the early 19th century.

The land locally was bought by John Inderwick (1785–1867) in 1836, "variously described as optician or ivory turner, and latterly as an importer of meerschaum pipes and snuff boxes", who became a successful speculative developer, and the architect was probably Joel Bray.

In 1838, the house was leased to George Hinton, who built the houses to the north in Canning Place.
