= Christ Church, Eldon Road =

Anglican church in Chalk Farm, London

Coordinates: 51.497623°N 0.186659°W

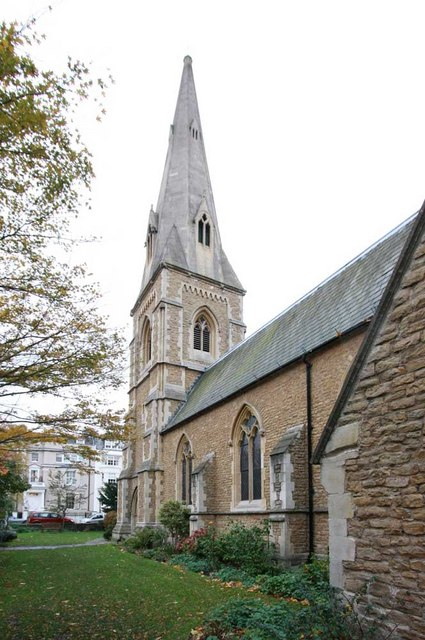
Christ Church

Christ Church, Eldon Road, also known as Christ Church, Victoria Road or Christ Church, Kensington is an Anglican church in the Kensington area of London. It occupies a Grade II listed building designed by Benjamin Ferrey in a Gothic Revival style.

== History ==
The church was devised in the 1840s as part of the Kensington New Town development. The site was chosen on the corner of Victoria Road and Eldon Road, and construction began in 1850, completing a year later with the Church's consecration.

The church spire was removed during the Second World War and reinstalled after the conclusion of the war. In the following decades, the church faced possible closure but evaded it each time with the backing of local residents.

== See also ==
- Christ Church, Chelsea
