= Christ Church, Chelsea =

Anglican church in Chelsea, London

Coordinates: 51.485613°N 0.163875°W

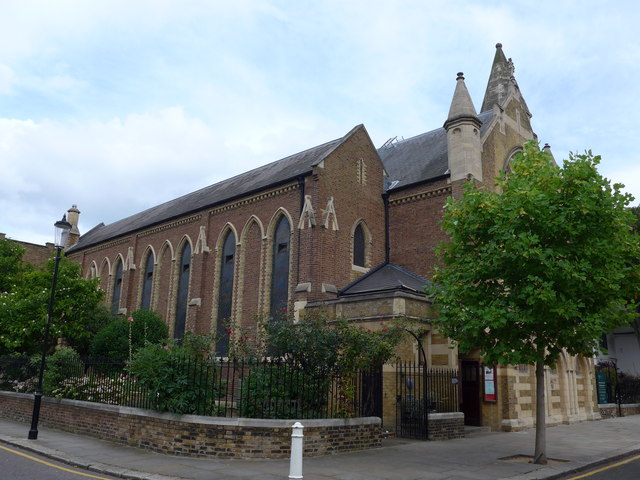
Christ Church

Christ Church, Chelsea, is an Anglican church in the parish of St Luke's and Christ Church. It occupies a brick Grade II listed building designed by Edward Blore in a Gothic Revival style.

== History ==
The building was constructed beginning in 1838 with Edward Blore as Architect. The design was characteristic of the less extravagant gothic styles of the early 19th century, retaining many of the sensibilities of Regency architecture. The church was consecrated in 1839 as a Chapel of Ease for St Luke's but was granted its own parish in 1860. In 1986, the parish was re-consolidated into the Parish of St Luke creating the joint parish of Saint Luke and Christ Church.

The church's pulpit was obtained in 1876 from St James Garlick Hill, and the organ case from St Michael Queenhithe. In 1901 additions were carried out by W. D. Caröe.

== See also ==
- St Luke's Church, Chelsea
- Christ Church, Eldon Road
