= Kensington New Town =

Residential district in London

Coordinates: 51°29′55.61″N 0°11′3.15″W

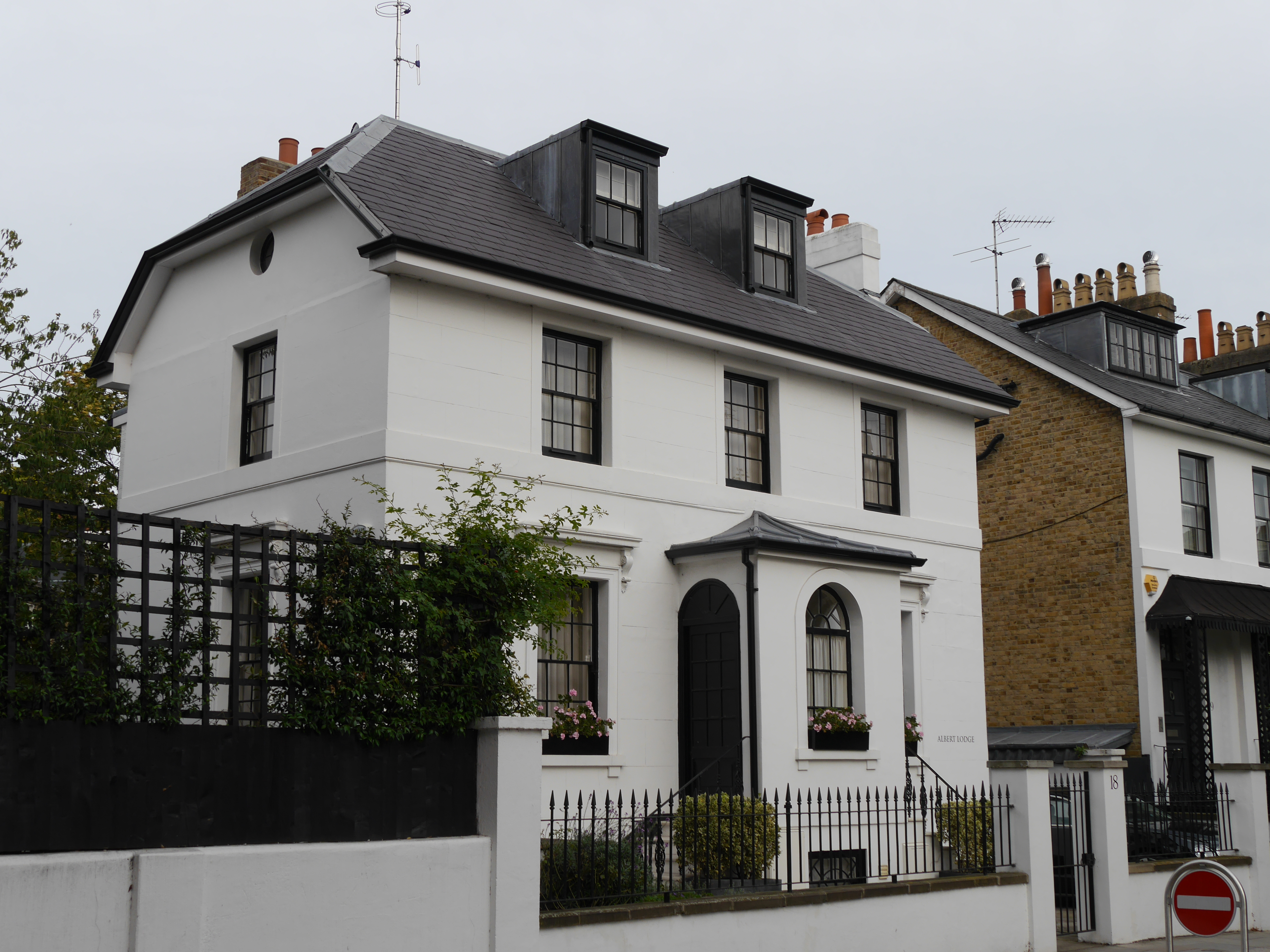
Albert Lodge at 18 Victoria Grove is rendered in stucco, which is typical of the area.

Kensington New Town is an area of housing in Kensington, London, which was developed in the early 19th century. It lies to the south of Kensington High Street and to the southwest of Kensington Gardens.

== History ==
The area first began to be built up in 1837, and the original construction continued until 1846. The developers included John Inderwick, a successful pipe-maker and tobacconist; John James Vallotton, who was a successful haberdasher in Jermyn Street; and Jonathan Hamston who was a carpenter and builder. The core of the district is the intersection of Launceston Place and Victoria Grove. Many of the original late Regency style buildings are still present into the 21st century. Most of the buildings in the area have an off-white or cream stucco exterior coating, with a small amount of brick houses. The Gloucester Arms, a Grade II listed pub, is at the centre of the area, along with various shops.

The borough council recognised and protected this area as the Kensington New Town Conservation Area in 1969 and this has since been extended to become the De Vere Conservation Area.
