= Victoria Avenue =

Victoria Avenue may refer to:

== Canada ==
- Victoria Avenue (Hamilton, Ontario)
- Victoria Avenue (Saint-Lambert, Quebec)
- Victoria Avenue (Regina, Saskatchewan)
- Victoria Avenue (Montreal and Westmount)

== Elsewhere ==
- Victoria Avenue, Perth, Australia
- Victoria Avenue, Cambridge, Britain
- Victoria Avenue (Jersey)
- Victoria Avenue (Riverside, California), United States

== See also ==
- List of places named after Queen Victoria
- Queen Victoria Street (disambiguation)
- Victoria (disambiguation)
- Victoria Street (disambiguation)
