= Heelas of Reading =

English department store

Coordinates: 51.45540°N 0.97218°W

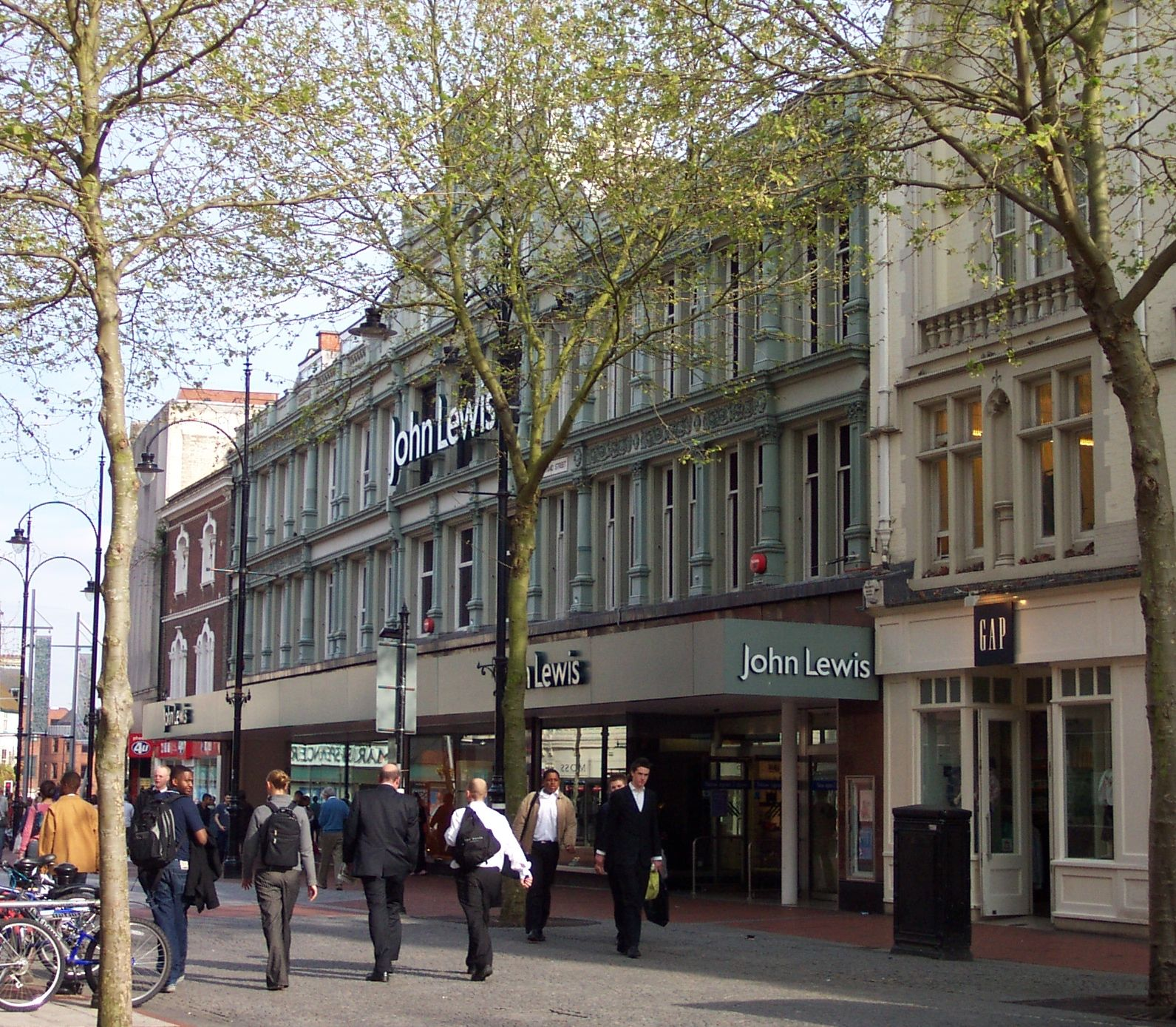
The front of the store on Broad Street

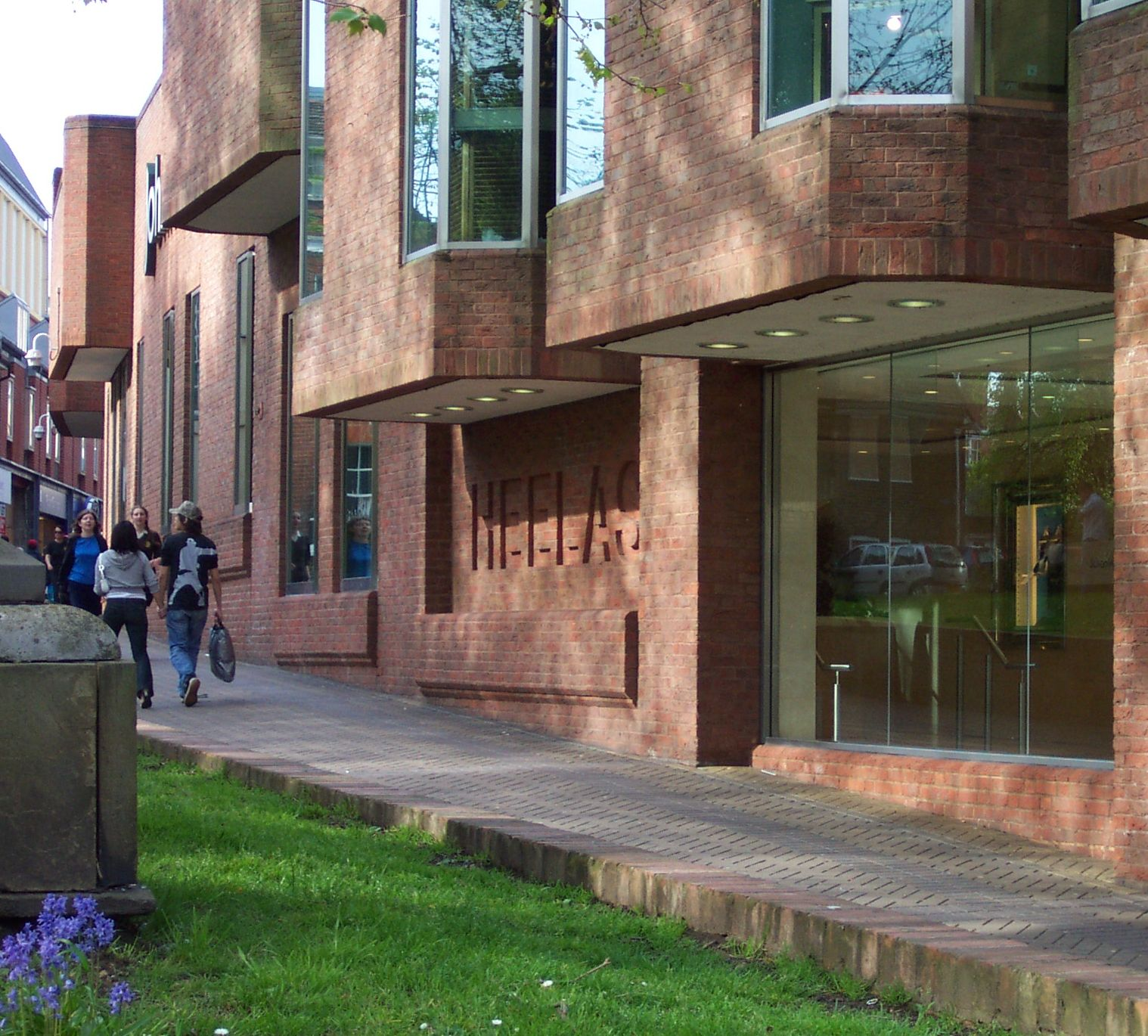
The side of the store with "Heelas" name visible

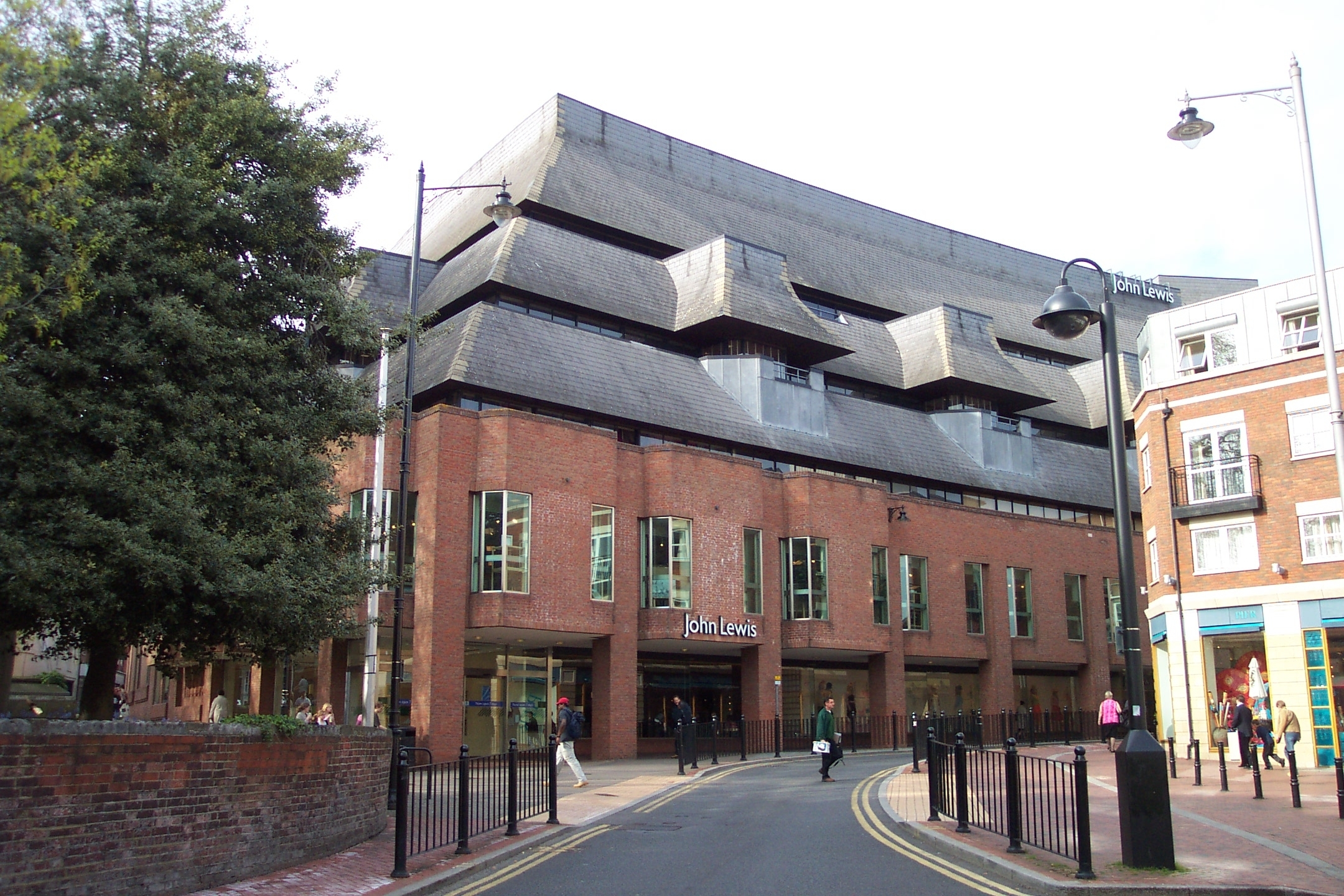
The rear of the store on Minster Street

Heelas (now branded as John Lewis & Partners) is a major department store in Reading in the English county of Berkshire. It was known as Heelas until 2001 and that name is still in common usage. The store fronts on to Reading's main pedestrianised shopping street, Broad Street, and backs onto Minster Street and The Oracle shopping centre. The store has belonged to the John Lewis Partnership since 1953.

== History ==
Heelas started in Reading with just one small shop at 33 Minster Street. John Heelas, who already had a shop in Wokingham, set up the new business in 1854 with his sons, John and Daniel. They described themselves as 'Linen and Woollen Drapers, Silk Mercers etc..'. Over the years they acquired adjacent properties and by 1877 the business had become a department store.

In 1897 the family firm became a public company, Heelas Sons and Co. Ltd, and in 1890 the House of Heelas was appointed Linen Drapers and House Furnishers to the then Prince of Wales. This warrant was continued on his accession to the throne as King Edward VII.

The shop was rebuilt in 1907 and the directors were confident that the 'handsome well-arranged buildings would add to the great comfort of the customers'. Both John and Daniel Heelas died in 1910; their successors, John Heelas Junior and Edward Heelas, inherited a thriving business. Heelas became a major entity in Reading, and in 1937, the John Lewis Partnership entered into takeover discussions with the department store. These did not work out, but in 1947 Heelas was sold to Charles Clore. He disposed of it three years later to United Drapery Stores who, in turn, sold it to the John Lewis Partnership in 1953. Throughout these changes, the store continued to trade as Heelas.

At the time of John Lewis' takeover, the store was the largest shop in Berkshire. With the business continuing to grow, however, the shop eventually became seen as too small and in need of expansion. Ambitious redevelopment plans were announced in 1975 and a large-scale model of the re-envisaged Heelas was put on display in the shop. The building work started in December 1979 and was split into three phases, allowing the shop to continue trading throughout the period. While the front (Broad Street) of the store dating from 1907 was little changed, the earlier rear (Minster Street) was demolished and replaced with a new five-storey building with an atrium. The work was completed by November 1985.

In 1999 a major new shopping and leisure centre, The Oracle, opened behind the store. Among its many shops at the time were department stores Debenhams and House of Fraser, thus increasing the level of competition in Reading. On Sunday 2 September 2001, as part of a wider company rebranding, the store's name was changed from Heelas to John Lewis. It was also the first time the shop had opened on a Sunday. Managing director Felicity Miller retired on 1 September. All the in-store and external signage was changed, but the name Heelas can still be seen where it was built into the external brickwork of the 1979 building. The renaming caused some local controversy, as some people felt the town was losing a part of its history. John Lewis continues to thrive in Reading where many stores have left or gone into receivership.

Over the last few years and since Covid struck, John Lewis Reading has encouraged external companies to buy space in its store. Ori Café and David Clulow opticians were located where the Haberdashery dept was previously located, on the mezzanine floor. From 9 October 2023 John Lewis Reading will become the first store to have The Floor Room taking over the existing Carpet department.

On 9 February 2007, the store was awarded a Royal Warrant by Her Majesty The Queen. This allows John Lewis Reading to display The Queen's coat of arms, together with the words "By Appointment to Her Majesty The Queen, Suppliers of Household and Fancy Goods", on the store's building, vehicles and stationery.

== Sources ==
- John Lewis Partnership - memorystore. Heelas of Reading. Retrieved 26 September 2019.
