= Victoria Grove, Kensington =

Street in Kensington, London

Coordinates: 51.498891°N 0.184320°W

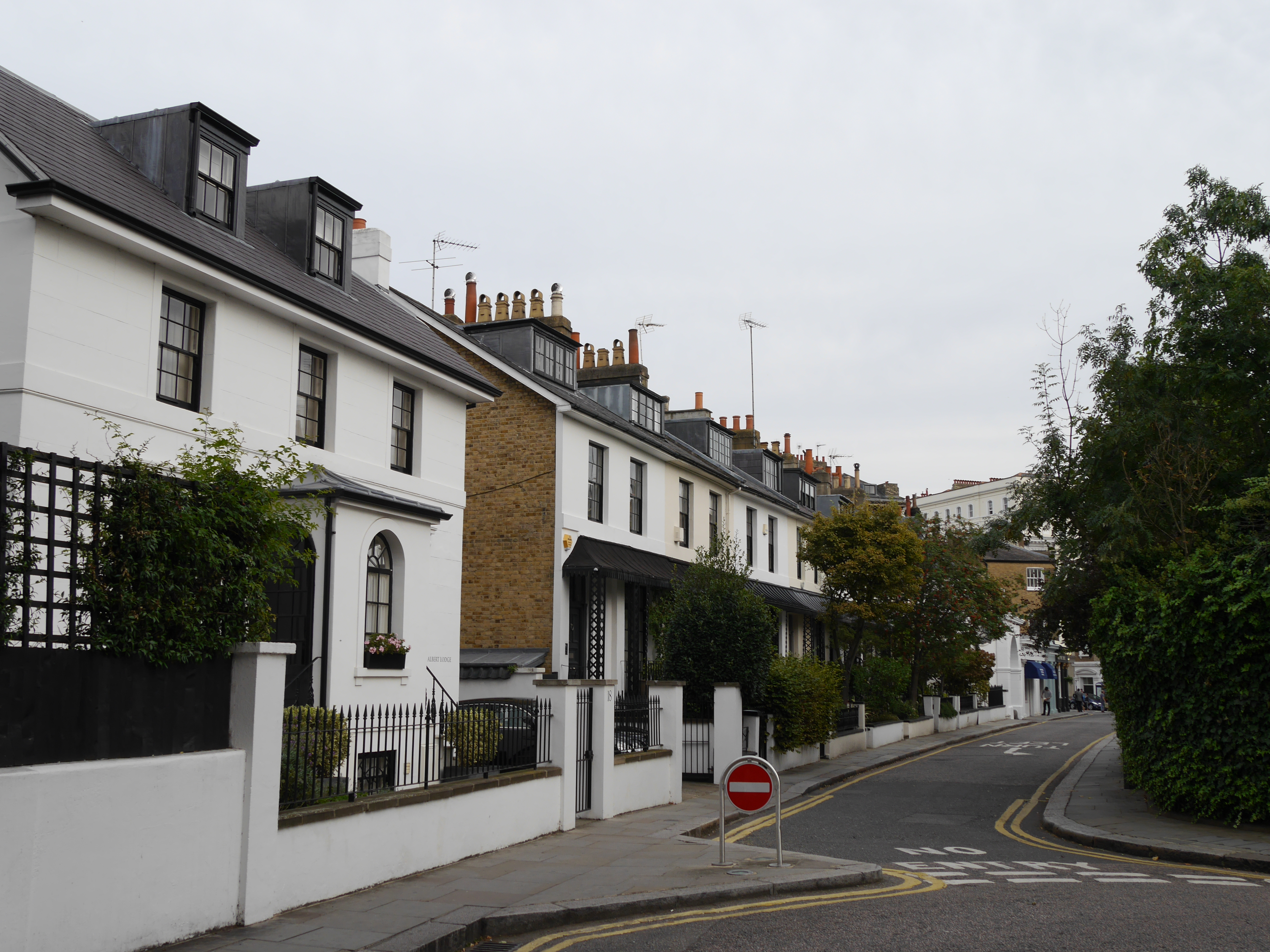
Victoria Grove, 2016

Victoria Grove is a street in Kensington, London W8. House building began in 1837 and was completed in 1841.

The land locally was bought by John Inderwick (1785–1867) in 1836, "variously described as optician or ivory turner, and latterly as an importer of meerschaum pipes and snuff boxes", who became a successful speculative developer, and the architect was probably Joel Bray.

It runs from Launceston Place in the north west to Gloucester Road in the south east. 6–13, 18, 19–26, and 27-28 are all Grade II listed houses.

The street is mentioned in fictional book of Light Poetry Old Possum's Book of Practical Cats by T. S. Eliot as the home of Mungojerrie and Rumpleteazer.

== Characteristic Architecture ==
Victoria Grove contains two terraces of houses of complimentary architecture. Southern terraces have triple arched windows while northern terraces have covered canopy over ground floor windows. Dormers are a recurring pattern on either sides.
