= Union Street, Reading =

Pedestrianised street in Reading

Union Street
- Smelly Alley
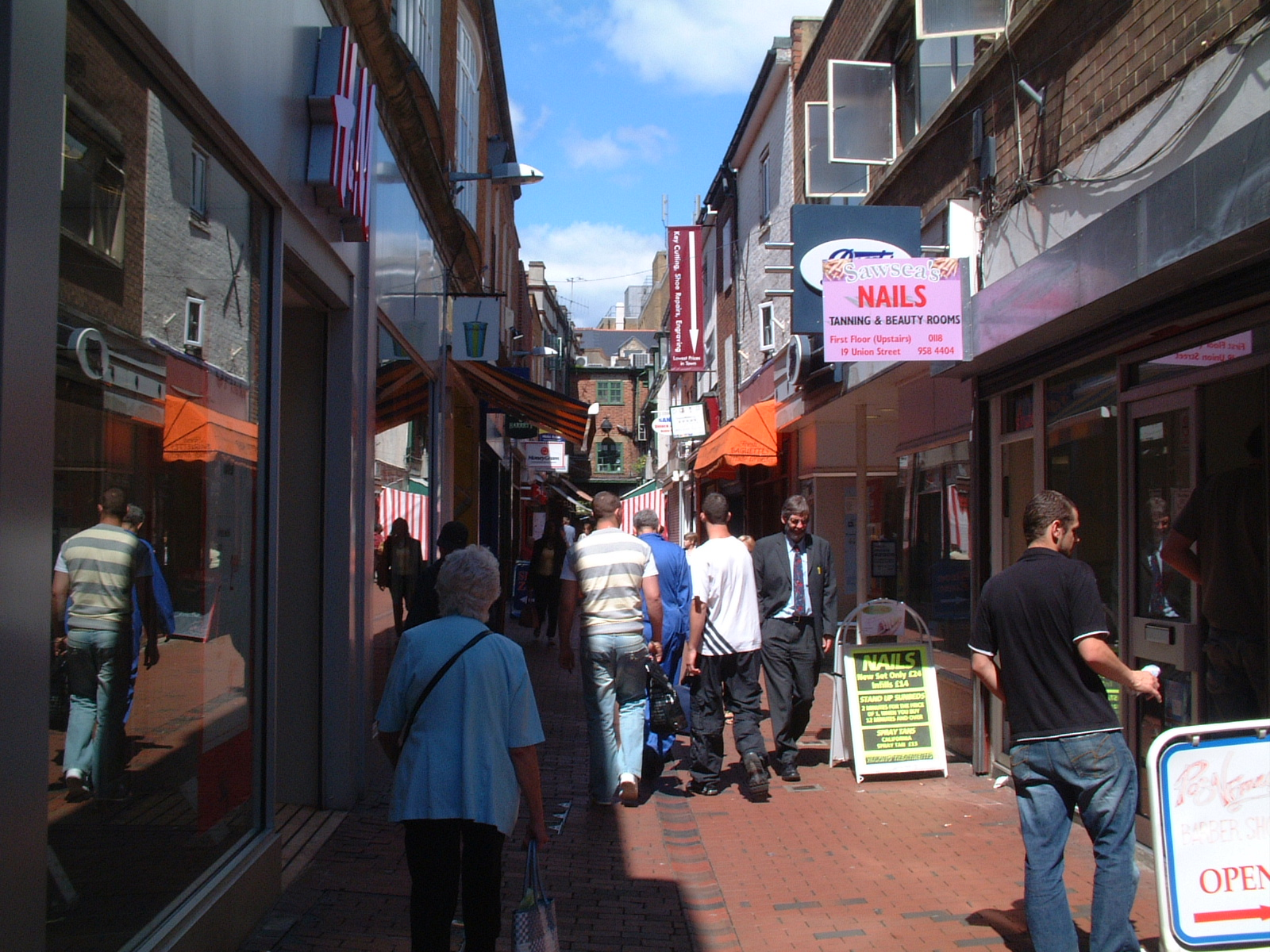
- View north in 2007
- Interactive map of Union Street
- Location: Reading, Berkshire, UK
- Postal code: RG1
- Coordinates: 51°27′22.58″N 0°58′24.04″W

Union Street, also known locally as Smelly Alley, is a pedestrian alley in the centre of the English town of Reading. It is lined with small shops and other retail outlets, and connects Broad Street and Friar Street. The name Smelly Alley came about in the 1940s, as there were many butchers and greengrocers, as well as two wet fish shops. In the 1970s there were four butchers, two greengrocers and two wet fish shops; also a baker's shop, two record shops, a hi-fi shop, a shop selling jeans, a cafe, a roast chicken shop, a chocolate shop and a hardware shop.

The name Smelly Alley comes from the presence of the long-established Frosts, a fishmongers. 2019 saw the closure of Frosts, considered the last of the 'smelly' shops. The Grumpy Goat, a cheese and beer shop, was opened on the street in 2020, with the owners quoted in local media as looking to make 'Smelly Alley smelly again'; however, this closed in late 2023. In 2025, inReading described Union Street as “a sea of vape and mobile phone accessory shops”.
