= Broad Street, Reading =

High street in Reading, England

Broad Street
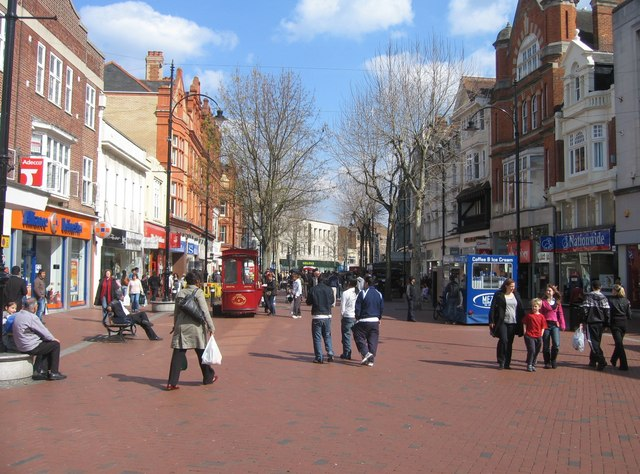
- View east of Broad Street in 2008
- Interactive map of Broad Street
- Length: 0.25 mi (0.40 km)
- Location: Reading, Berkshire, England
- Postal code: RG1
- Coordinates: 51°27′20.11″N 0°58′17.96″W

Broad Street is a main pedestrianised thoroughfare and the primary high street in the English town of Reading. The street is situated in the town centre, running for approximately 0.25 miles (0.40 km), from west to east. The western end of the road lies at the crossroads with Oxford Road, West Street and St Mary's Butts. The eastern end continues as King Street after the junction with Minster Street and Butter Market (Market Place).

Today the street is principally known as a shopping destination, being anchored at its east and west ends respectively by The Oracle and Broad Street Mall enclosed shopping centres. However the street has also played an occasional role in English history, most especially during the Battle of Reading (1688), sometimes referred to as the Battle of Broad Street.

== History ==
The town of Reading is believed to have been founded in the Saxon period, and originally centred on the site of the current St Mary's Church, to the south of the western end of Broad Street. After 1121, the foundation of Reading Abbey, to the north of the eastern end of Broad Street, provided a stimulus for the rapid expansion of the town. Broad Street, and the parallel Friar Street, were laid out by the Abbey at this time, to connect the newer Norman part of town to the older Saxon centre.

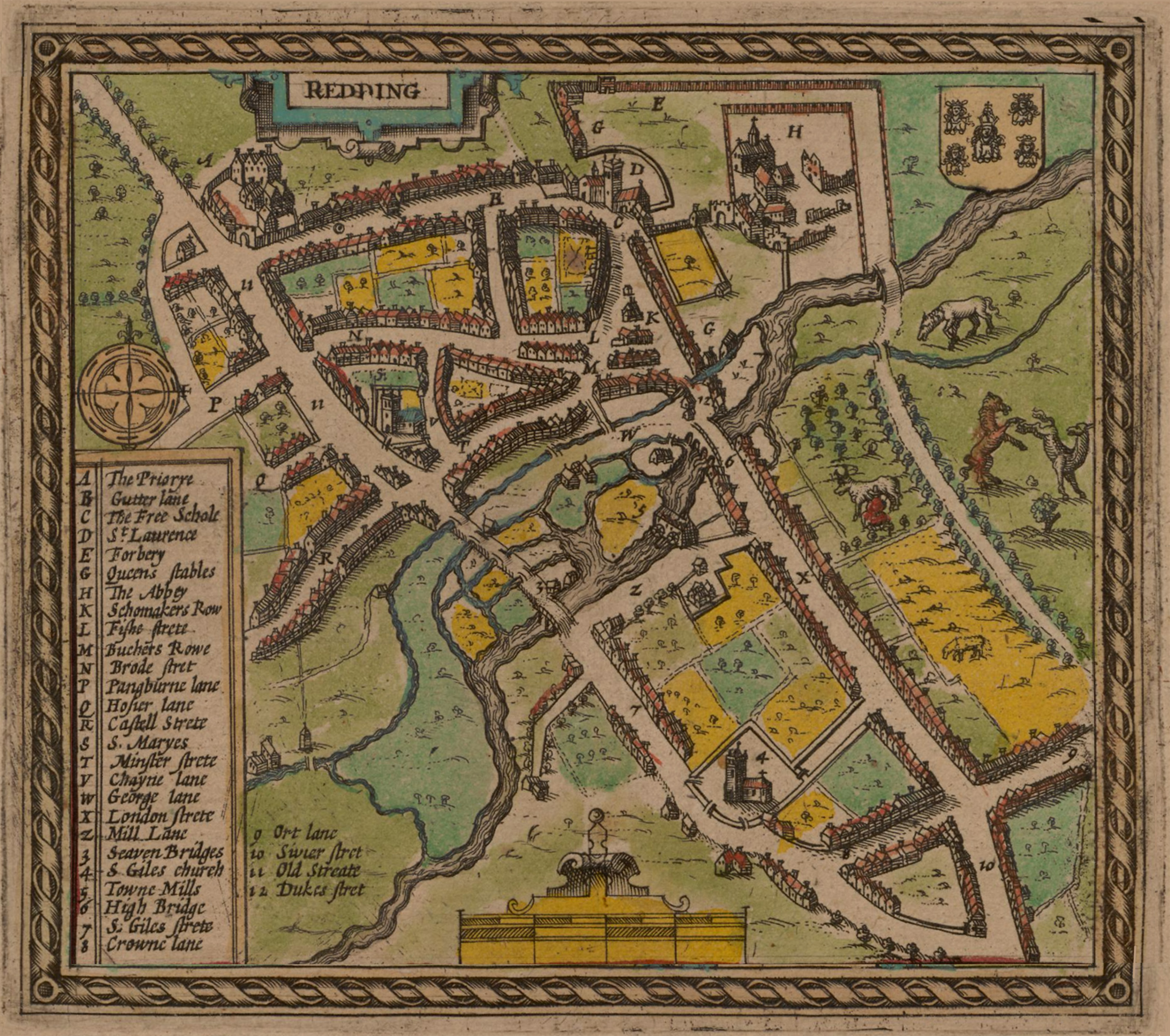
John Speed's map of Reading, published in 1611 (named Brode Stret)

The early street layout of Reading can be seen in John Speed's atlas, published in 1611 (named Brode Stret). Broad Street commenced at the junction with St Mary's Butts (then known as Old Street) and Oxford Road (Pangbourne Lane), and ran eastwards. Only two side streets are shown, with Chain Street running south and Cross Street to the north. Between the Cross Street and Minster Street, what is now the eastern end of Broad Street was occupied by two narrow and roughly parallel streets, Fisher Row and Butcher Row, with a middle row of buildings between them.

William Laud, the Archbishop of Canterbury executed for treason during the Civil War, was born in 1573 at a house where the junction of Broad Street and Queen Victoria Street now lies. During the Siege of Reading in that war, Francis Walsingham's town house, on the corner of Broad Street and Minster Street, was used by Robert Devereux, the 3rd Earl of Essex, as his headquarters. The house had previously been used to entertain Elizabeth I.

Broad Street was central to the second Battle of Reading, also known as the Battle of Broad Street, in 1688. In this skirmish, the only significant military action of the Glorious Revolution, the Royalist army of James II was defeated by the Protestant troops of Prince William of Orange. Two days after the defeat of his troops in Reading, James quit London and fled to France. William assumed the British crown in 1689 as William III.

In 1862, the row of shops that had occupied the centre of what is now the eastern end of Broad Street was demolished. The narrow streets of Fisher Row and Butcher Row were joined and became part of Broad Street. In 1879, the first line of the Reading Tramway Company's horse-drawn tramway was opened along Broad Street.

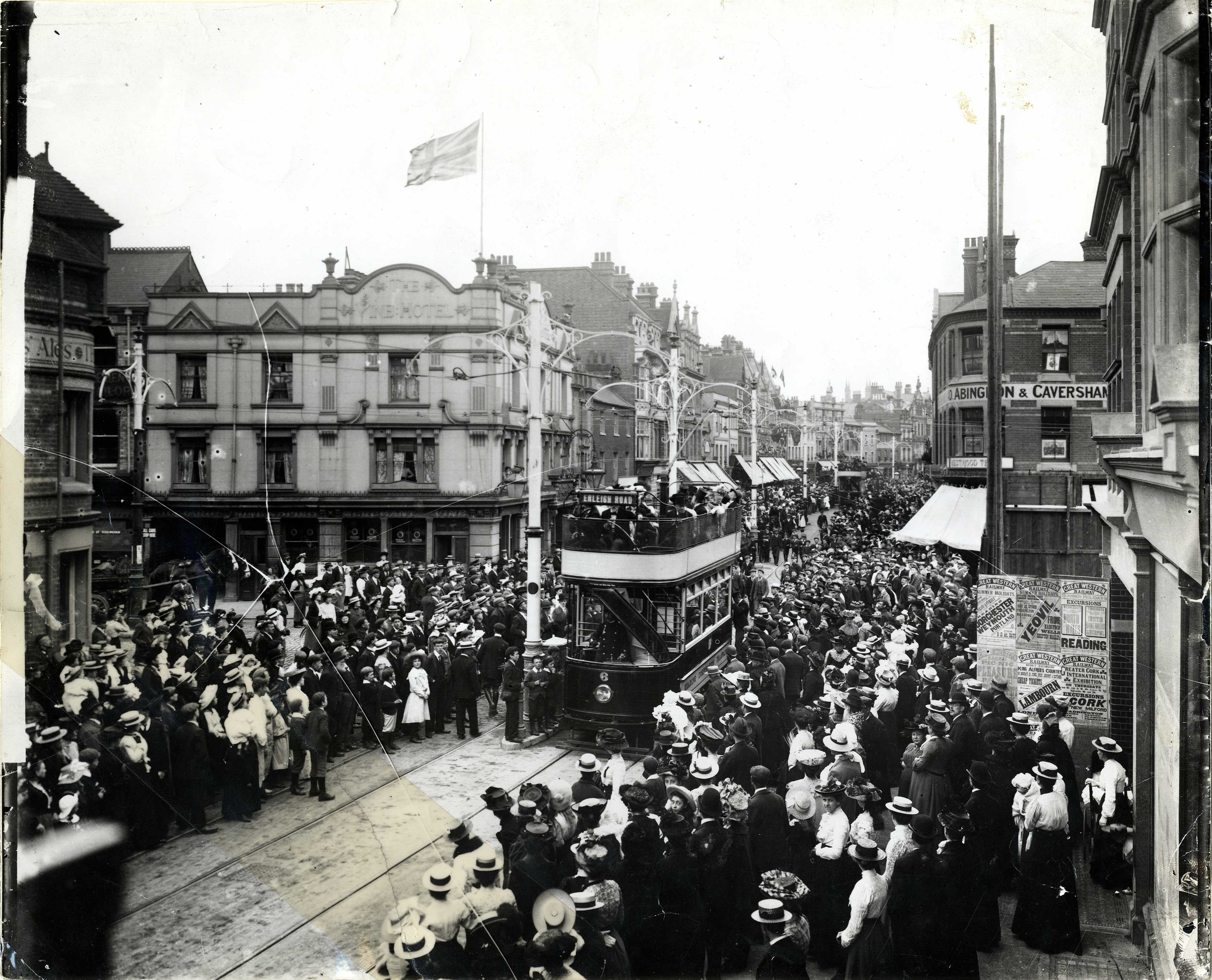
Reading Corporation Tramways opening ceremony, 22 July 1903

In 1903, Reading Corporation Tramways' electric trams replaced the horse-drawn tramcars along Broad Street. The following year, the last major change to the street plan of Broad Street occurred when Queen Victoria Street was opened, cutting through various old properties between Broad Street and Friar Street. Queen Victoria Street at last provided a direct link from Broad Street to Reading station, opened in 1840.

The last tram services in Reading continued to operate along Broad Street until 1939, when they were replaced by trolleybuses. These in turn were retired in 1968, when diesel buses took over. In 1970, Broad Street was closed to all traffic except buses and for access, with through traffic diverted onto a one-way system and the first phase of the town's Inner Distribution Road.

Broad Street was further pedestrianised in 1995, and the bus services that previously used it were diverted onto the loop route around the town's central area, using St Mary's Butts, Friar Street, Market Place and Minster Street. The street was subsequently remodelled with a red-brick surface extending across the whole width of the street, and with the inclusion of street trees, sculpture and licensed street traders.

== Retail ==
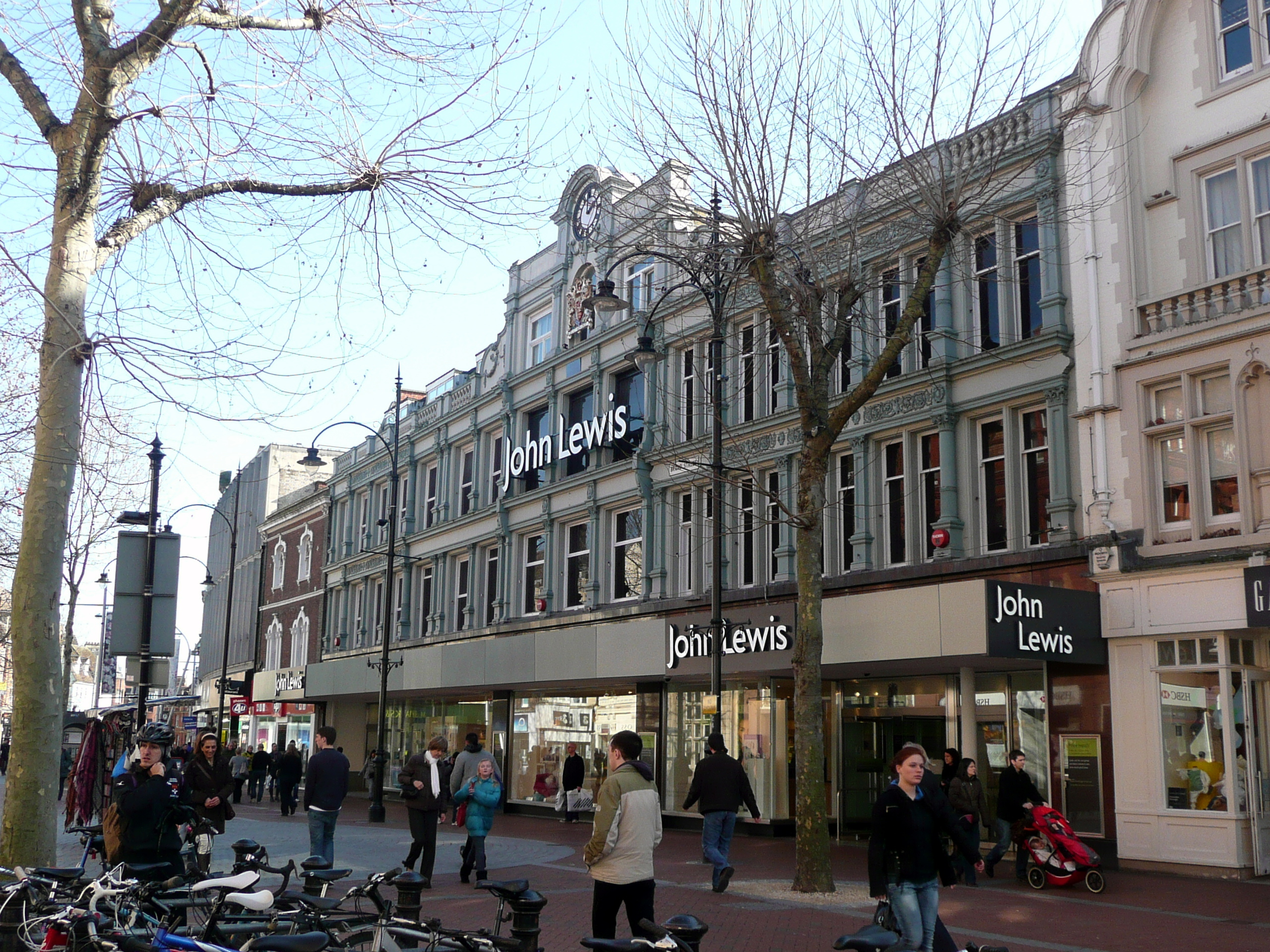
John Lewis & Partners (originally Heelas)

The department store of John Lewis & Partners (formerly known as Heelas) is located on Broad Street. There are also branches of many chain stores, including Boots, H&M, Marks and Spencer, Next, Sainsbury's, schuh and W H Smith. The Broad Street branch of booksellers Waterstone's is of particular interest, as it is a remarkable conversion of a nonconformist chapel dating from 1707.

The Oracle shopping centre has a direct entrance from Broad Street, and houses major stores as well as a large selection of restaurants and bars.

Union Street known locally as Smelly Alley due to its open fronted fishmonger's and greengrocer's shops, is a narrow street which runs between Broad Street and the parallel Friar Street. Although the number of food shops has declined recently, it is still home to a number of local independent stores.
