= Victoria International College =

Nepalese undergraduate program

- Type: Private, Non-profit
- Established: 2009
- Affiliations: Pokhara University
- Principal: Mr. Nawal GM
- Location: Ghorahi, Dang
- Website: Official website

Victoria International College, or Victoria College, is the first BBA undergraduate programme launched in mid western development region of Nepal. This college is situated in Ghorahi city, the headquarters of Dang district. This programme is the first and still the only BBA programme in the Rapti zone that was started since 2009. There is a similarly named college in Kuala Lumpur, Malaysia.

== Gorkha Education group ==
This programme is an effort of the Gorkha Education group, a group of Gorkhas involving 114 ex and serving army personnel including other intellectual personalities, that has already served the people of Ghorahi city via Gorkha International for 10 years. This college has been established with the aim of producing skilled and able manpower in the sector of business and management all over the country, due to the growing demand of BBA graduate in the sector of business.
