= Queen Victoria Street, Hong Kong =

Street in Central, Hong Kong

Coordinates: 22°17′1.43″N 114°09′19.73″E

Queen Victoria Street
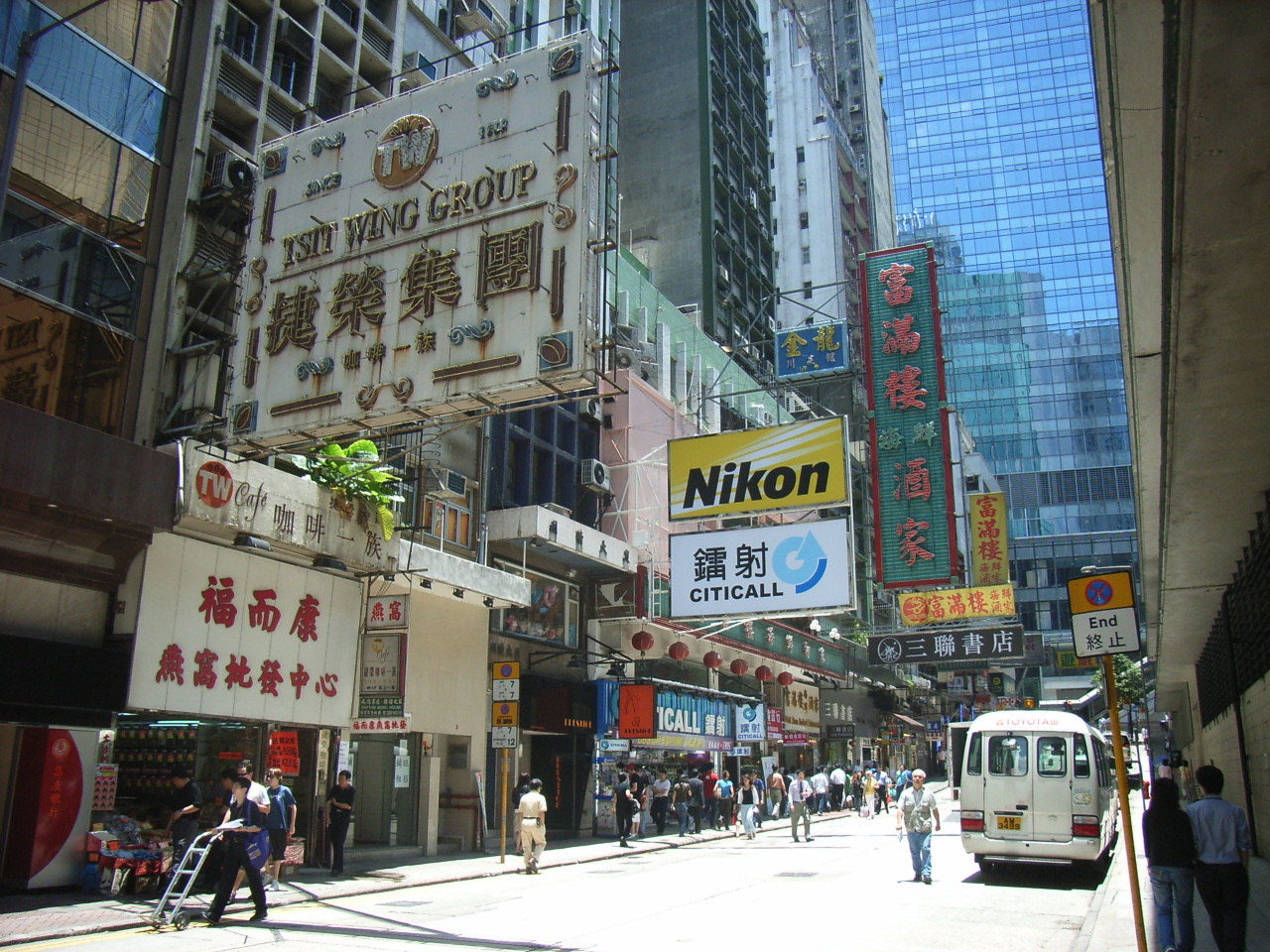
- Section of Queen Victoria Street, between Des Voeux Road Central and Queen's Road Central in June 2006
- Interactive map of Queen Victoria Street
- Native name: 域多利皇后街 (Yue Chinese)
- Namesake: Queen Victoria
- Length: 200 m (660 ft)
- Location: Central, Hong Kong
- North end: Connaught Road Central
- South end: Queen's Road Central

Queen Victoria Street, Hong Kong
- Chinese: 域多利皇后街
Transcriptions
Standard Mandarin
- Hanyu Pinyin: Yùduōlì Huánghòu Jiē
Yue: Cantonese
- Jyutping: wik6 do1 lei6 wong4 hau6 gaai1

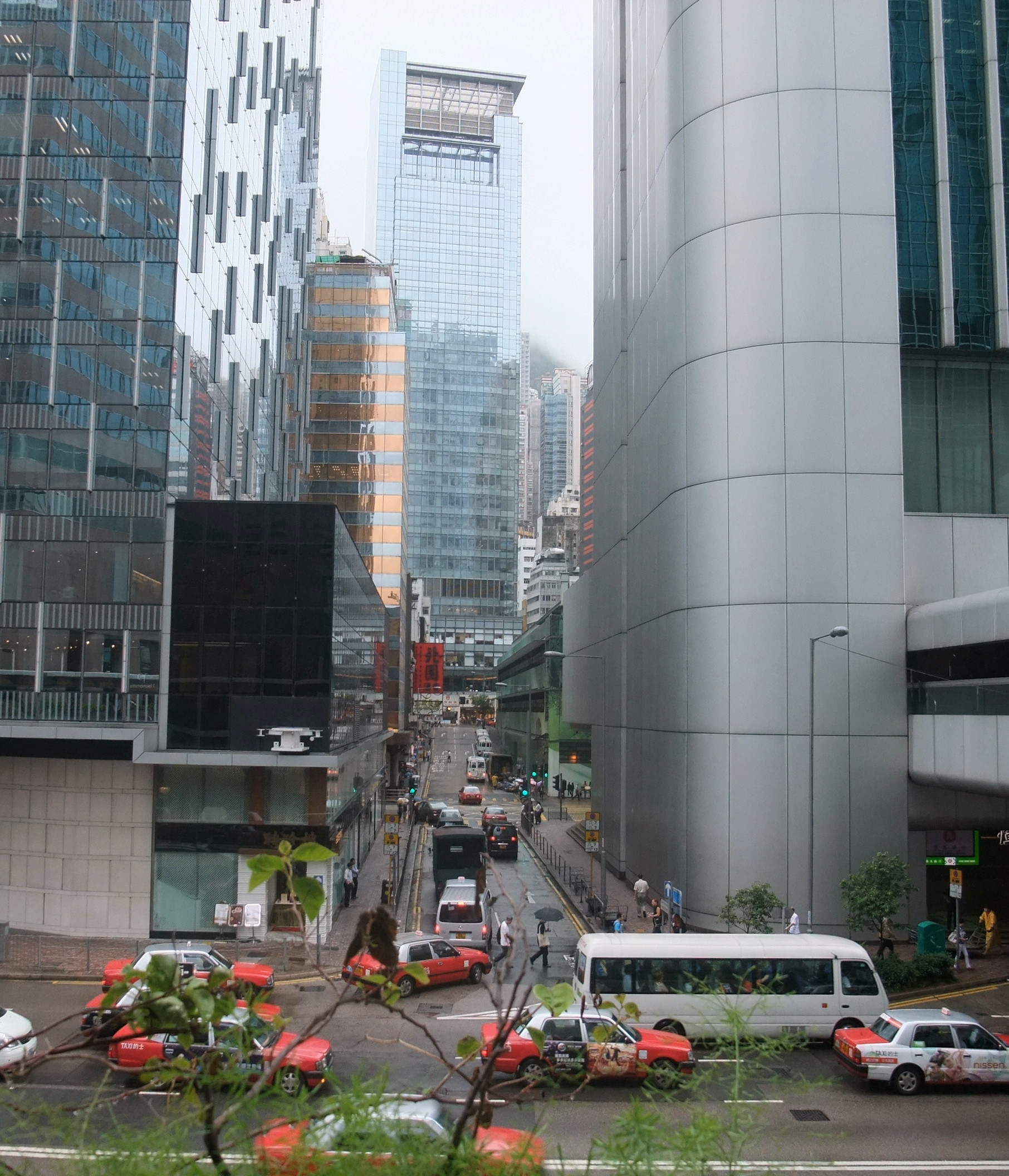
Beginning of Queen Victoria Street: Intersection with Connaught Road in August 2011

Queen Victoria Street (Chinese: 域多利皇后街) is a one-way street in Central, Hong Kong Island, Hong Kong. Named after Queen Victoria, the street stretches from Connaught Road Central to Queen's Road Central. The street is noted for the many landmarks that it runs past, namely Central Market and the headquarters of the Hang Seng Bank.

== History ==
During the First Opium War, the British occupied Hong Kong in 1841; the following year, the territory was ceded to them in the Treaty of Nanking. The street is named after Queen Victoria, who was the reigning British monarch at the time Hong Kong was colonised. Particularly, its Chinese name is a mistranslation of "Queen" and means queen consort rather than queen regnant.

At the time of the handover of Hong Kong in 1997, it was believed that Queen Victoria Street would be renamed along with other streets and places to erase memories of the colonial past. This was in spite of a statement by the Urban Council declaring it generally had no intention of modifying the names of streets which bore colonial references. The renaming did not come to fruition during the handover, and the street still retains its royal name to the present day.

== Description and features ==
From its northern end, Queen Victoria Street begins at Connaught Road Central, travelling down one-way past the headquarters of the Hang Seng Bank, located on the west side of the street. It then reaches the intersection with Des Voeux Road Central; the next segment of the street ascends up a slope southwards. Here, it passes Central Market—also located on its west side—before terminating at Queen's Road Central. The street is parallel to the adjacent Jubilee Street, which runs west of Queen Victoria Street, and follows the same route, albeit with the landmarks to its east.

== Intersections ==
The entire route is in Central, Central and Western District.

| km | mi | Destinations | Notes |
|---|---|---|---|
| 0.000 | 0.000 | Route 4 (Connaught Road Central) | Westbound entrance only |
| 0.084 | 0.052 | Des Voeux Road Central | |
| 0.200 | 0.124 | Queen's Road Central | Western terminus |
1.000 mi = 1.609 km; 1.000 km = 0.621 mi: Incomplete access

== See also ==
- List of places named after Queen Victoria
- List of streets and roads in Hong Kong
