= Friar Street, Reading =

Street in Reading, England

Friar Street
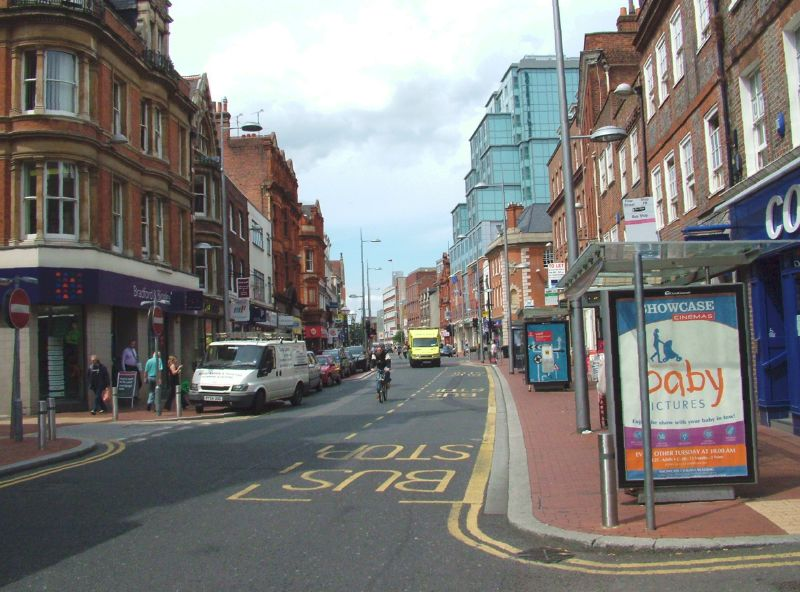
- Friar Street looking west in 2007
- Former name(s): New Street
- Location: Reading, Berkshire, UK
- Postal code: RG1
- Coordinates: 51°27′23.95″N 0°58′25.03″W

Friar Street is a thoroughfare in the English town of Reading. It runs parallel to Broad Street, connected by Union Street, Queen Victoria Street and Cross Street. At the western end is the Greyfriars Church and at the eastern end are the Town Hall and St Laurence's Church.

== History ==
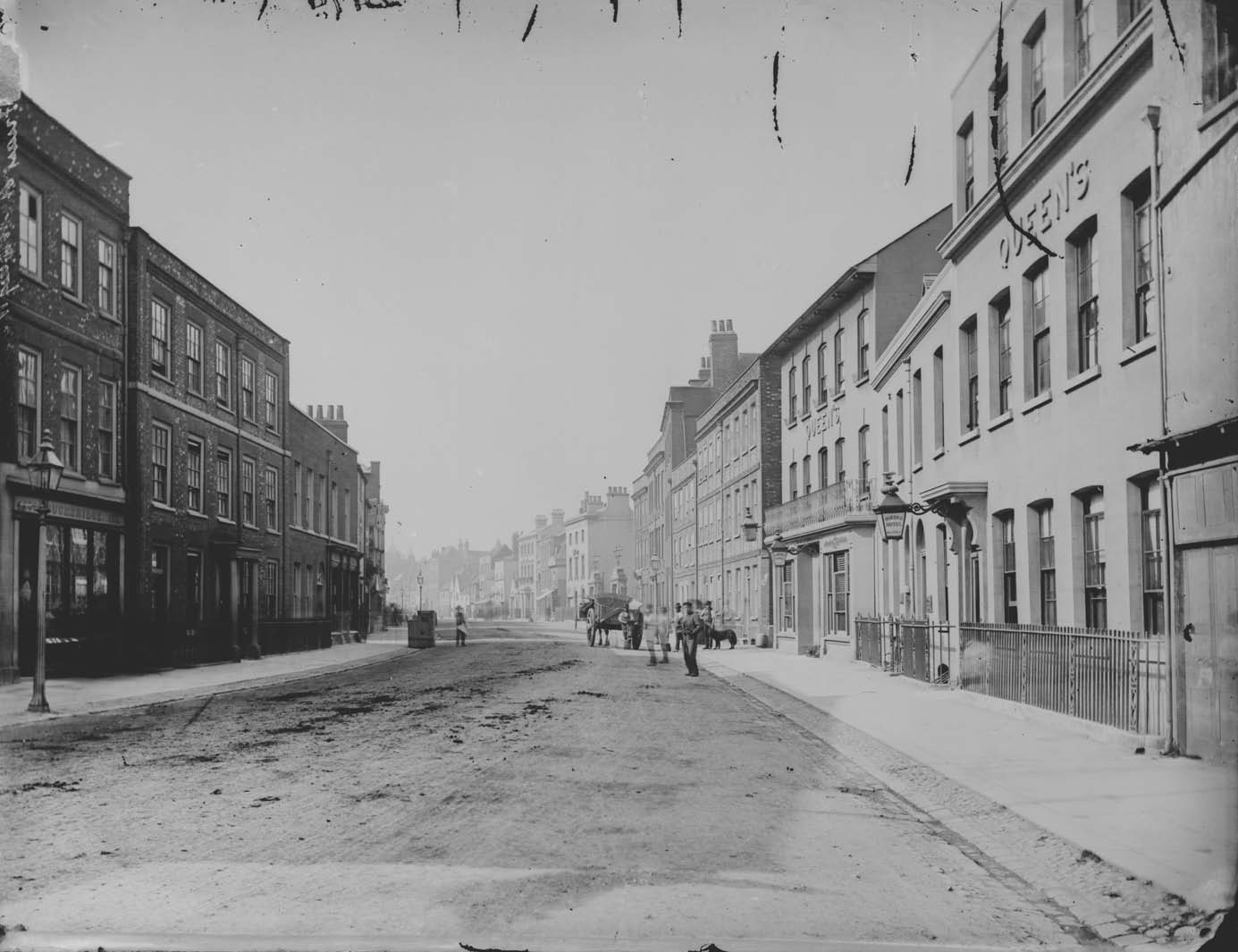
Friar Street looking west, c. 1875 by Henry Taunt

Excavations carried out on Friar Street in 1997 at the location of a proposed extension Marks and Spencer store by the Oxford Archaeological Unit revealed successive layers of old buildings, some of which date back to the 13th century.

The Frank Matcham-designed Royal County Theatre, built in 1895, was located on the south side of Friar Street. It burned down in 1937.

The opening of a Sainsbury's supermarket in 1963 led to the closure of many smaller shops.

== Friars Walk ==
Friars Walk shopping centre, located at the western end of Friar Street, opened in 1973–4. From around 2009 to 2019 it was derelict. For six years (up until 2018), Friars Walk was known as "The Mall" and used as a venue for airsoft and immersive zombie survival games. Zed Events have since moved the Zombie Mall experience to a new site to allow for demolition of Friars Walk as part of the Station Hill development. On 1 August 2019, a scaffolding collapse occurred at the demolition site.
