= Queen Victoria Street, Reading =

Street in Reading, England

Queen Victoria Street
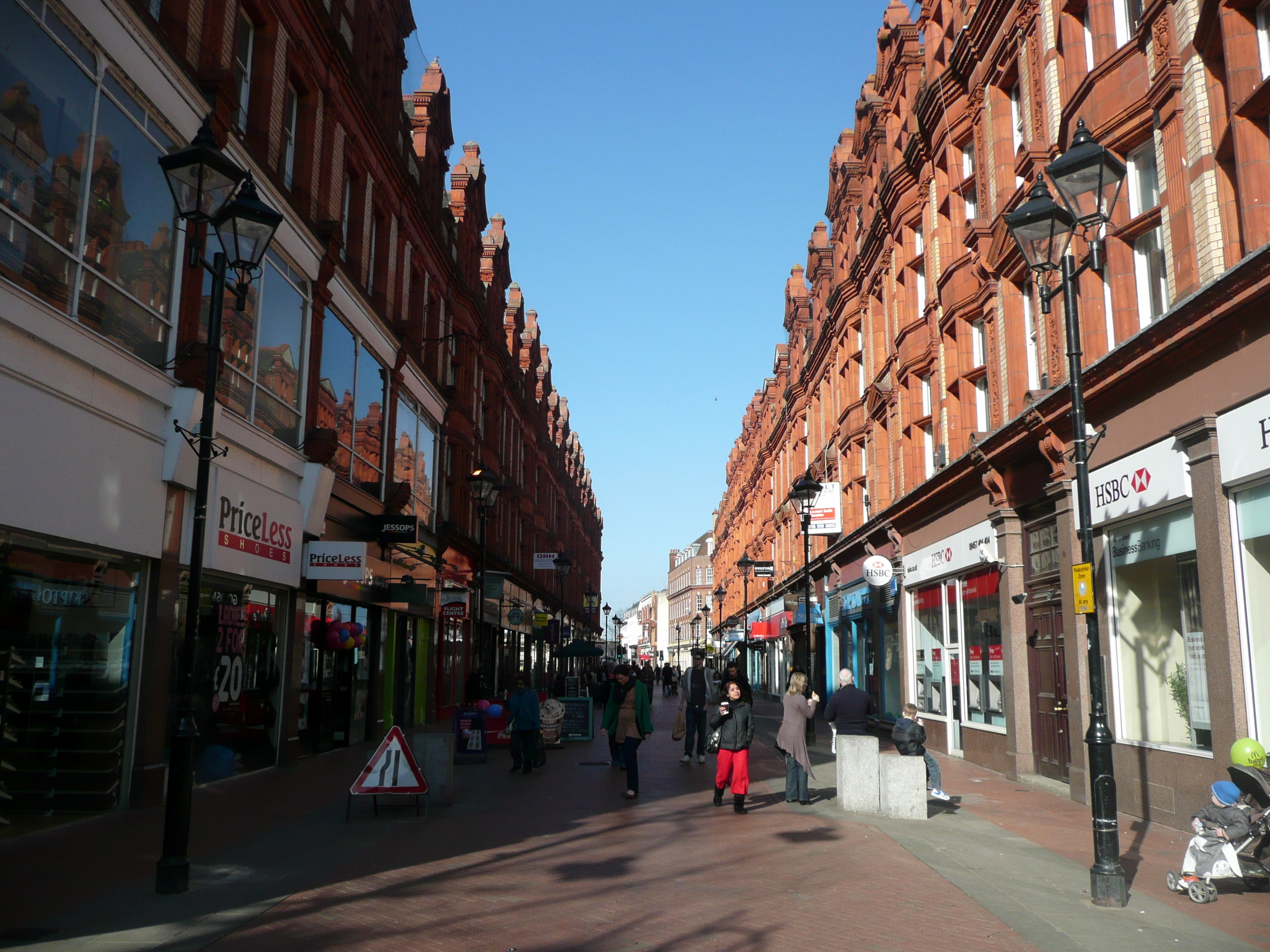
- View north towards Reading railway station
- Location: Reading, Berkshire, UK
- Postal code: RG1
- Coordinates: 51°27′22.44″N 0°58′19.63″W

Construction
- Completion: 1903

Queen Victoria Street is a pedestrianised thoroughfare in the English town of Reading, Berkshire. It connects Broad Street with Friar Street and Station Road.

== History ==
Queen Victoria Street is a relatively new street in the history of Reading, being constructed in the early years of the 20th century to provide a direct route from Broad Street to Station Road and hence Reading's railway station, which had opened in 1840. The road was the work of Councillor J.C. Fidler, a local businessman who was also responsible for the rebuilding of West Street, the construction of the Market Arcade, and the acquisition of Prospect Park for the town. Queen Victoria Street was nearing completion in 1903, when Councilor Fidler died.

The building of the street involved the demolition of several properties on both Friar Street and Broad Street. These included Laud Place, a block of tenements built in 1813 on the site where William Laud, the Archbishop of Canterbury executed for treason during the Civil War, was born in 1573.
