= The Oracle, Reading =

The Oracle

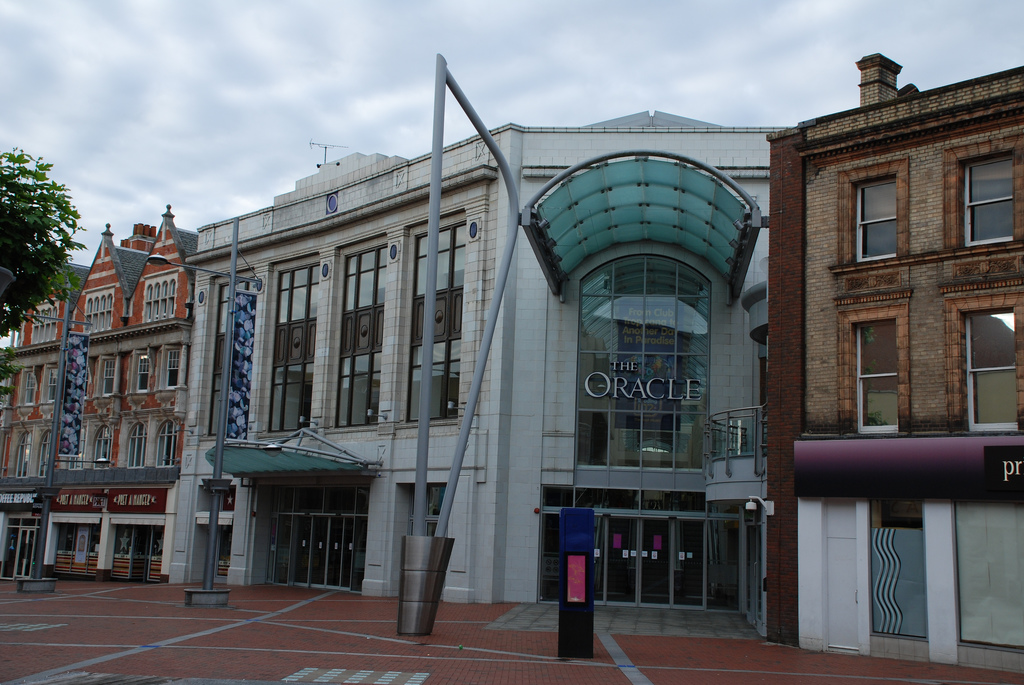
- Broad Street frontage
- Location: Reading, Berkshire, UK
- Coordinates: 51.45328°N 0.97239°W
- Opened: 23 September 1999; 27 years ago
- Developer: Hammerson
- Manager: JLL (company)
- Owner: Hammerson
- Num. of stores: 108
- Num. of anchor tenants: 2 (TK Maxx and Zara)
- Floor area: 76,200m²
- Floors: 3
- Parking: 1,611 spaces over 7 floors in the Riverside car park and 595 spaces over 2 floors in the Holy Brook car park
- Website: www.theoracle.com

The Oracle is a large indoor shopping and leisure mall on the banks of the River Kennet in Reading, Berkshire, England. Partly on the site of a 17th-century workhouse of the same name, it was developed and is owned by Hammerson.

== History ==
The Oracle takes its name from the 17th century Oracle workhouse, which occupied part of the site and was built by funds from John Kendrick.

In 1997, the property developer Hammerson acquired a 22-acre (8.9 ha) site of largely derelict land immediately to the south of the town centre. Most of this site was previously occupied by Simonds Brewery (latterly owned by the Courage brewing company) and by the Reading Buses depot (formerly the Reading Corporation tram depot). The brewery had earlier relocated to a new site adjoining the M4 motorway, whilst the bus depot was relocated to a location just west of the town centre as one of the first phases of the redevelopment.

Hammerson's strategy was to create a combination of big-name retailers at the new centre, including a number of international retail banners fairly new to Britain. The merchandise mix had a strong emphasis on fashion and is slightly higher-end than the average for Reading's main street shops. Peter Cole, the development director for Hammerson said "We were looking to bring in a retail mix that would enhance what was already there – we wanted to get the right caliber retailers to suit the slightly higher-end shopping demographic of the area."

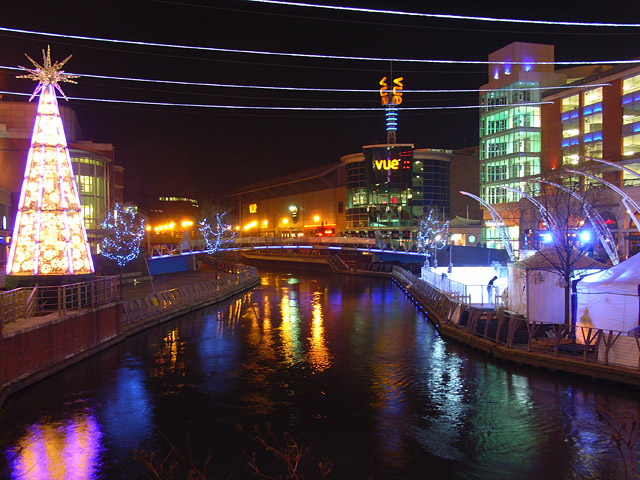
Riverside level at night with the River Kennet flowing through

The main shopping malls comprising phase I of The Oracle were opened in September 1999, followed in November by the Riverside restaurants, pubs and cinema that made up phase II. Once phase I was complete, the way was open to relocate the Debenhams department store from its previous location on Broad Street into the centre. This in turn allowed for the redevelopment of the old Debenhams site as phase III of The Oracle, linked to phase I by a bridge over Minster Street. Phase III provided The Oracle with a direct link to Broad Street, and was opened in May 2000 by The Princess Royal.

== Stores and facilities ==
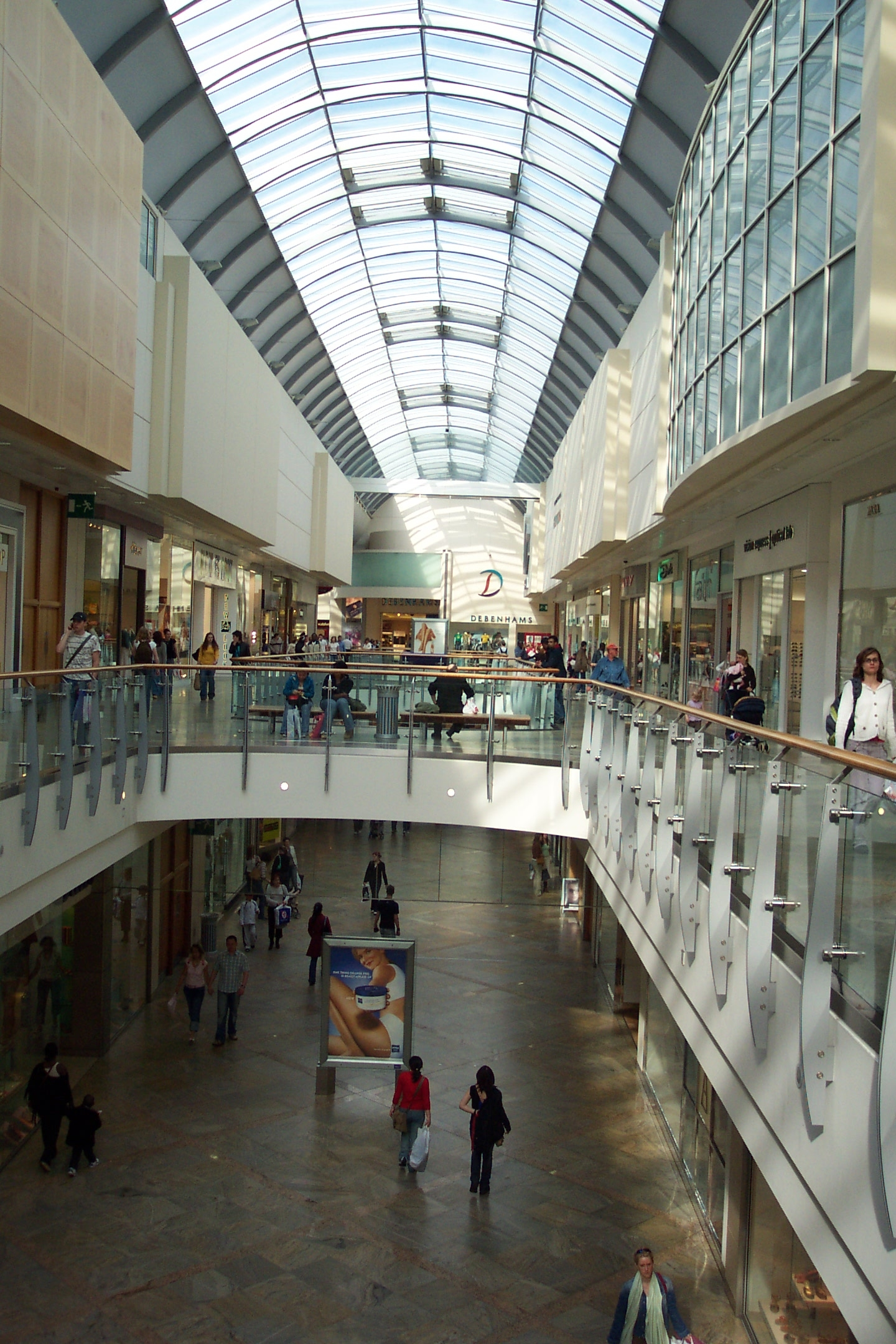
The Oracle main arcade

The centre contains 90 shops, including department stores from Next plc (136,000 square feet (12,600 m^{2})) and House of Fraser (150,000 square feet (14,000 m^{2})) chains. A third and larger department store, John Lewis & Partners (formerly Heelas) is adjacent to the Minster Street entrance but not part of the centre itself. There are also 22 restaurants, cafés and bars along the riverside of the Kennet, and an 11-screen Vue cinema. The Oracle increases Reading's retail footage by one third, and it has attracted some retailers who would otherwise not have located in Reading.

The Oracle Riverside area, with its restaurants and bars, spans Brewery Gut, a particularly narrow stretch of the River Kennet. The layout allows space for outdoor tables, and there is granite stadium-style seating. Two bridges have been installed spanning the Kennet—Cooks Bridge, a straight footbridge which links The Riverside Car Park to House of Fraser, and Delphi Bridge, an ellipse bridge providing access from the Vue cinema to Debenhams.

The Free Form Arts Trust were appointed as the arts agency, with responsibility for the appointment and contractual arrangements with artists. Specially commissioned artworks include the Crystal Beacon, a reflective translucent prism by Welsh artist John Gingell that tops off the multistorey car park.

The overall centre design concept was created by Haskoll & Co., London. They were called in to design a "retail for leisure" concept, linking the site to a heritage trail around the town.

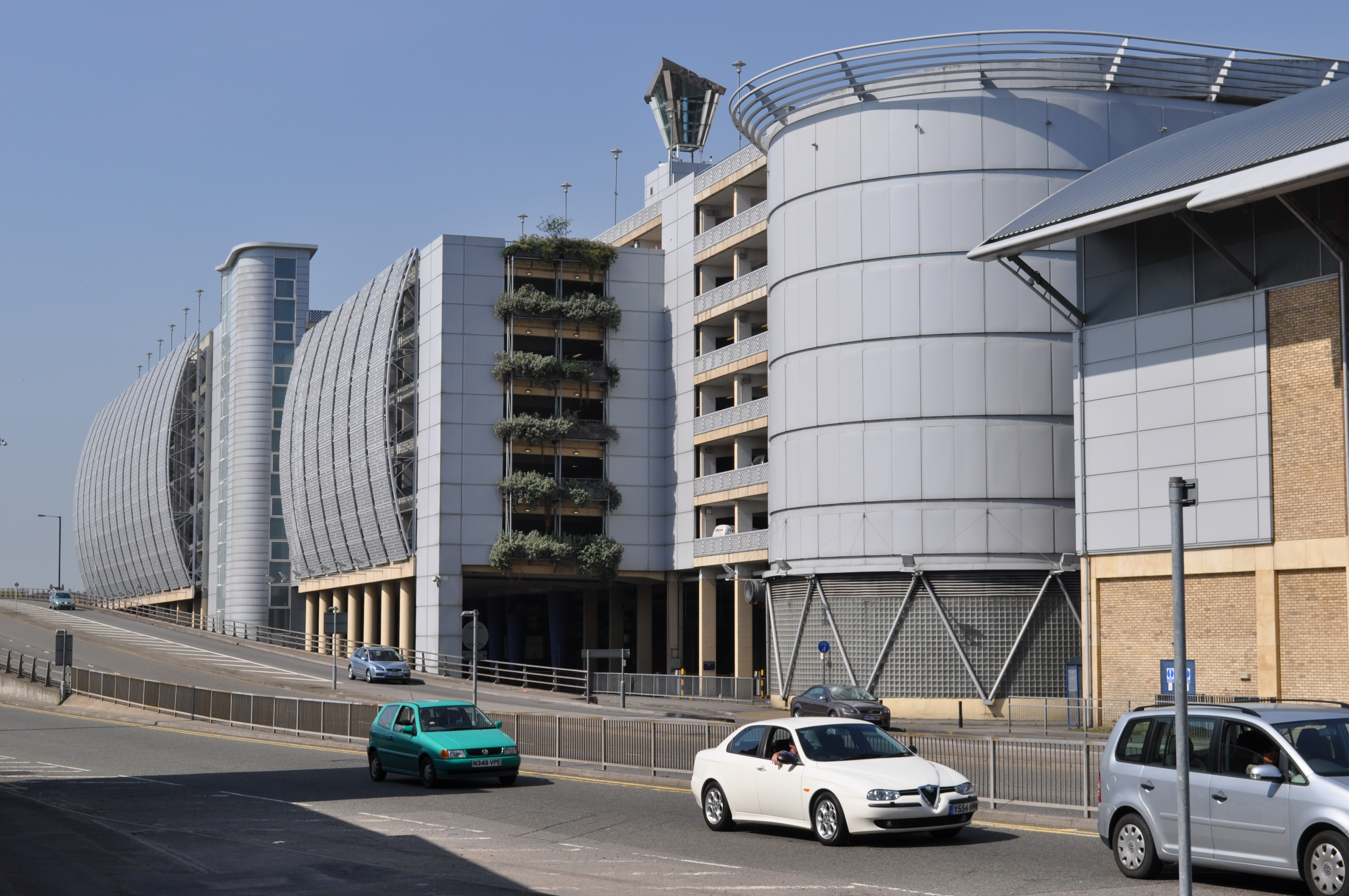
The Oracle car park and IDR

The Oracle also provides two large car parks providing 2,300 spaces.

== Awards ==
In 2002 Reading was named eighth best town centre in the country. In 2007 the Oracle centre was ranked 16th in a league table of best performing retail centres in the UK compiled by economic analyst Experian. In a separate poll carried out by Verdict, Reading was placed 10th in the table of UK shopping destinations.

- 2000 BCSC award for best new centre
- 2001 ICSC award for best International Shopping Centre
- Secure Car Park award 2000, 2001, 2002, 2003, 2004, 2005, 2006, 2007, 2008, 2009, 2010, 2011, 2012, 2013 and 2014
- Loo of the Year Awards 2001 and 2002
- 2003 BCSC Best Advertising Campaign
- 2007 BCSC 'Established Centre' Gold Award
- ROSPA Gold Award 2007, 2008, 2009, 2010, 2011, 2012, 2013, 2014
- Investors in People Award

The Oracle was also ranked 16th in the UK by Experian in 2007 for top-performing retail centre.

== References in popular culture ==
YouTuber and amateur pianist Joe Jenkins recorded a video titled 'Playing MEGALOVANIA in a mall until someone asks me to stop'. He lasted just under 2 hours until a security guard approached him and told him to stop.
