= Victoria Road, Kensington =

Street in Kensington, London

Coordinates: 51.5008°N 0.1857°W

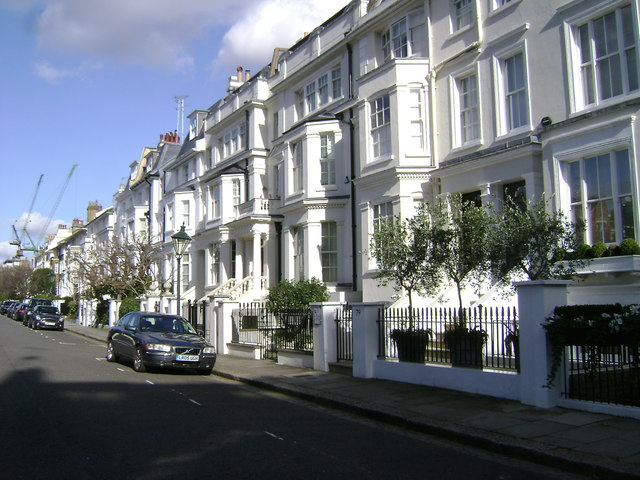
Victoria Road

Victoria Road is a street in Kensington, London, that in 2015 was considered the most expensive street in the United Kingdom. The street runs north to south from Kensington Road, Kensington High Street in close proximity to Kensington Palace and the Royal Albert Hall. Victoria Road actually runs from Kensington Road and not from Kensington High Street as cited previously. There are 64 properties on the street including the Embassy of Vietnam.

== History ==
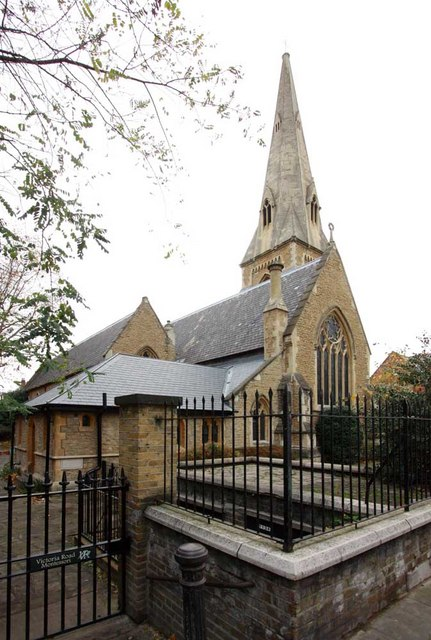
Christ Church on the junction of Victoria Road and Eldon Road

The street was originally called Love Lane and the white stucco-fronted houses date from the 1840s. In April 2012, it was named the "most expensive in UK", with residents including the actor Dustin Hoffman and the former king of Malaysia. In December 2015, it was named "the most expensive street in England and Wales", with an average property price of £8,006,000 in a study by Lloyds Bank based on Land Registry figures.

== Notable residents ==
- Thomas Oldham Barlow (1824–1889), the artist and mezzotint engraver, lived at Auburn Lodge, Victoria Road, where he had a studio and died there in 1889.
- Edward Henry Corbould (1815–1905), artist and art tutor to Queen Victoria's children, lived at no. 52.
- Henry Newbolt (1862–1938), poet, lived at 14 Victoria Road from 1889 to 1898.
- In autumn 1910, the Mitford family moved to a house in Victoria Road.
- Rudolf Nureyev (1938–1993), lived at no. 27 before moving to Paris.
- Annabelle Neilson (1969–2018), socialite, attended Lady Eden's School.
