= John Inderwick =

English tobacco pipe maker and property developer

John Inderwick was an English tobacco pipe maker and property developer.

== Biography ==
John Inderwick founded a tobacconist shop in Wardour Street, Soho, in 1797. This continued as Inderwick & Co for many years and was located at number 45 in Carnaby Street at a time when that street was considered fashionable in the Swinging Sixties. He introduced the Meerschaum pipe to London and bought a mine in Crimea to supply sepiolite for production.

After he had been in business for several years without financial hardship, he invested in property development in Kensington, which was built up during the 18th century. He developed a substantial estate of six and half acres which became known as Kensington New Town and then followed this with a similar scheme at Kensington Gate. At the time of his death in 1867, he also owned properties in Haverstock Hill, Camden Town, Woolwich and the West End of London.
