= Malmaison Hotel, Reading =

Hotel in Reading, Berkshire, England

Malmaison Reading Hotel
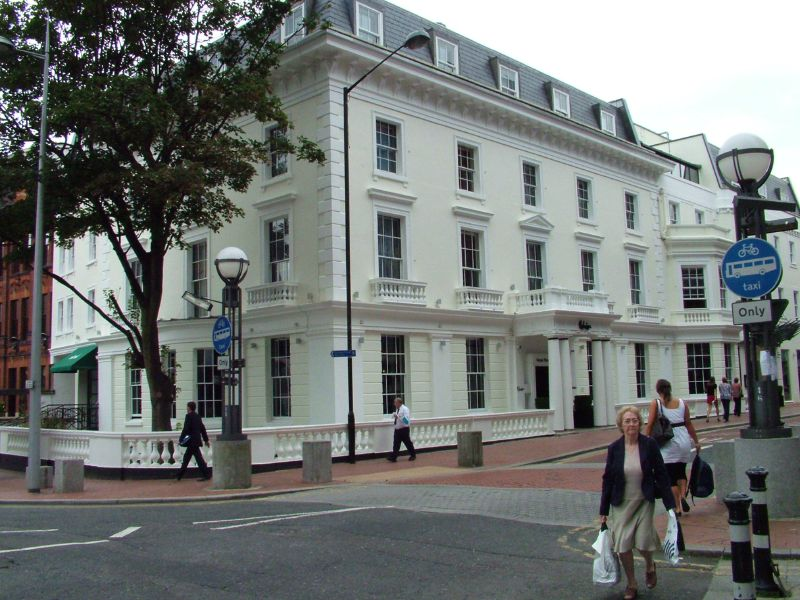
- Malmaison Hotel in 2007

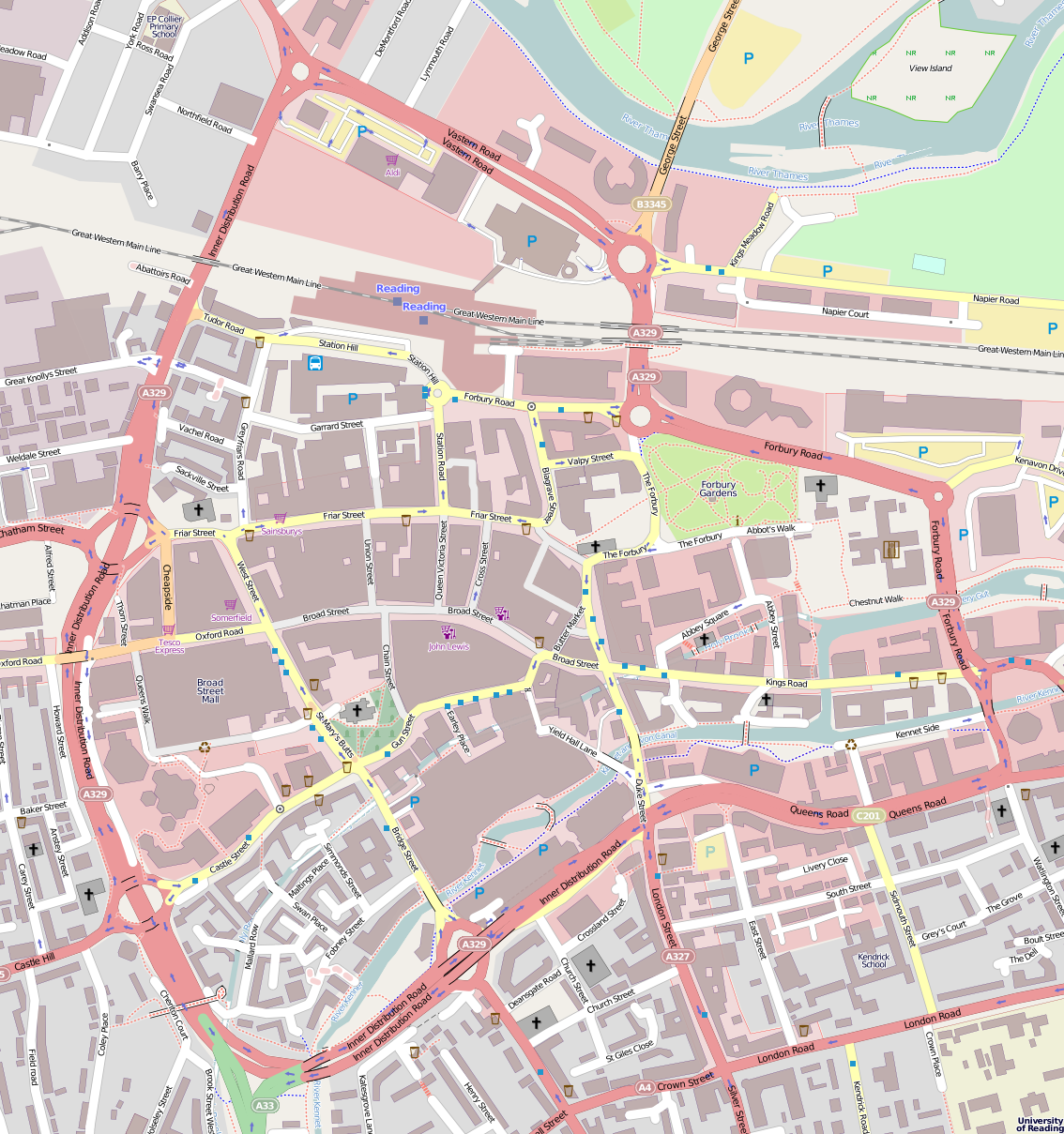
- Location within Reading Central
- Hotel chain: Malmaison

General information
- Location: Reading, Berkshire, UK, Great Western House; 18-20 Station Road; Reading; RG1 1JX
- Coordinates: 51°27′26.64″N 0°58′18.35″W
- Opening: 1844

Other information
- Number of rooms: 75
- Number of suites: 6
- Number of restaurants: 1

The Malmaison Hotel Reading (formerly the Great Western Hotel) is a grade II listed hotel in the town of Reading in the English county of Berkshire. It is situated at the junction of Blagrave Street and Station Road, directly opposite the main entrance to Reading railway station and Thames Tower. It was opened in 1844, shortly after the Great Western Railway opened its line from London, and is thought to be the oldest surviving purpose-built railway hotel in the world.

== History ==
When the Great Western Main Line from London to Bristol was completed in 1841 a hotel was needed for people visiting the town. According to English Heritage, the building is likely to have been designed by Isambard Kingdom Brunel, who was GWR's Chief Engineer at the time of its construction and who incorporated similar features in the Royal Station Hotel at Slough (which was demolished in 1938).

The building was completed in 1844 and was used as a hotel until a fire in the 1960s. Subsequently, the building was used as offices until it was renovated by the Malmaison hotel chain and reopened, in 2007, as the Malmaison Hotel.
