= Reading railway station =

Principal railway station in Berkshire, England

Reading
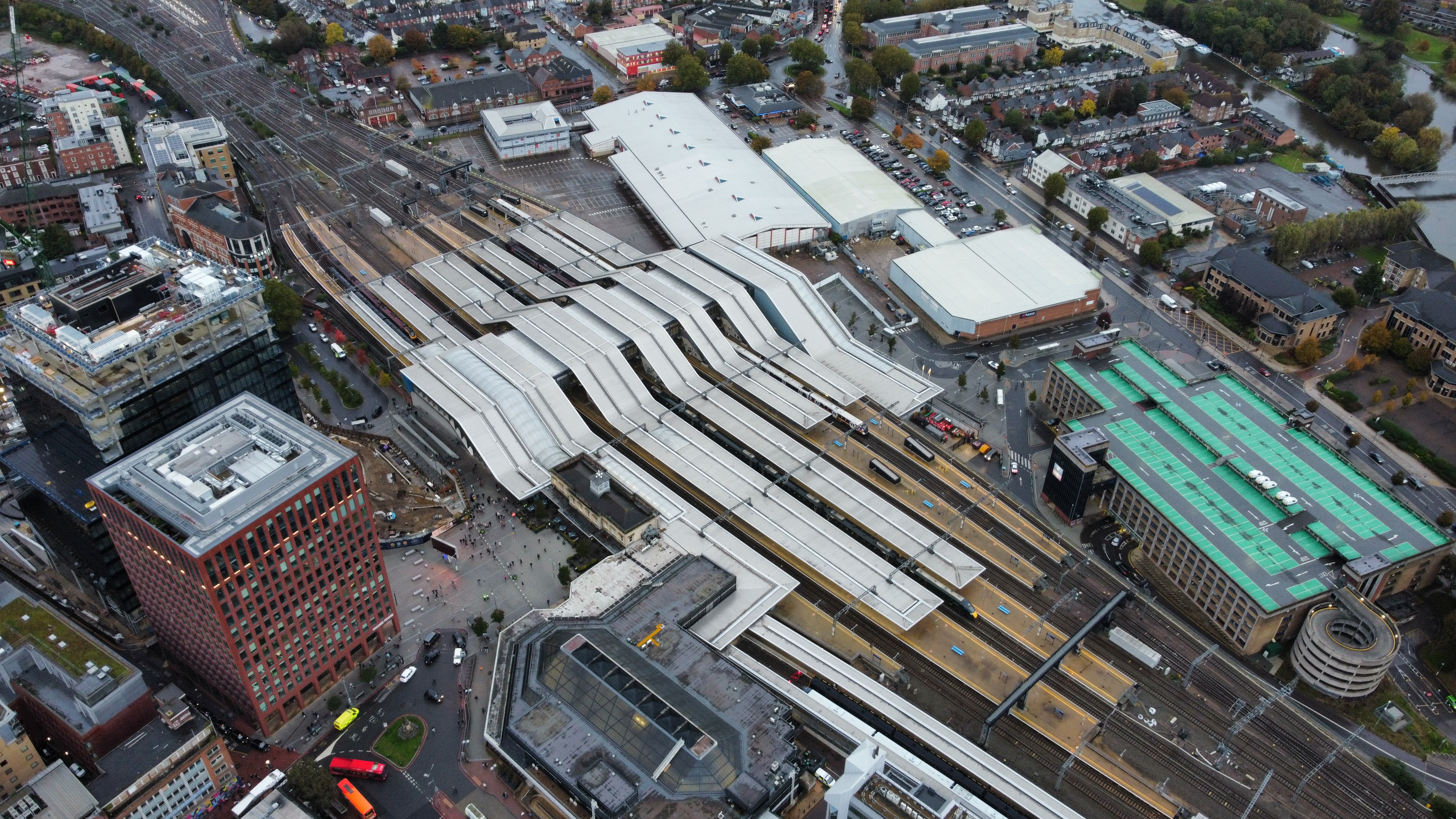
- Aerial view of Reading station

General information
- Location: Reading, Berkshire, England
- Coordinates: 51.4590°N 0.9722°W
- Grid reference: SU714738
- Manager: Network Rail
- Platforms: 15
- Train operators: Great Western Railway; South Western Railway; CrossCountry; Elizabeth line

Other information
- Station code: RDG
- Classification: DfT category B
- Website: www.networkrail.co.uk/communities/passengers/our-stations/reading-station/

History
- Former names: Reading General
- Original company: Great Western Railway

Key dates
- 30 March 1840: First opened
- 6 September 1965: absorbed Reading Southern station

Passengers
- 2021/22: ▲8.818 million
- Interchange: ▲2.216 million
- 2022/23: ▲12.401 million
- Interchange: ▲3.730 million
- 2023/24: ▲13.490 million
- Interchange: ▼3.411 million
- 2024/25: ▲14.325 million
- Interchange: ▲4.058 million
- 2025/26: ▲14.788 million
- Interchange: ▲4.392 million
Location
Notes
- Passenger statistics from the Office of Rail and Road

Reading railway station is a major transport hub in the town of Reading in Berkshire, England, it is 36 miles (58 km) west of London Paddington. It is sited on the northern edge of the town centre, near to the main retail and commercial areas and the River Thames. It is the busiest station in Berkshire, and the third busiest in South East England.

Reading is the ninth busiest railway station in the UK outside London and the second busiest interchange station outside London.

The station is managed by Network Rail and is served by four train operating companies: Great Western Railway, CrossCountry, South Western Railway and the Elizabeth line.

== History ==
=== Original station ===
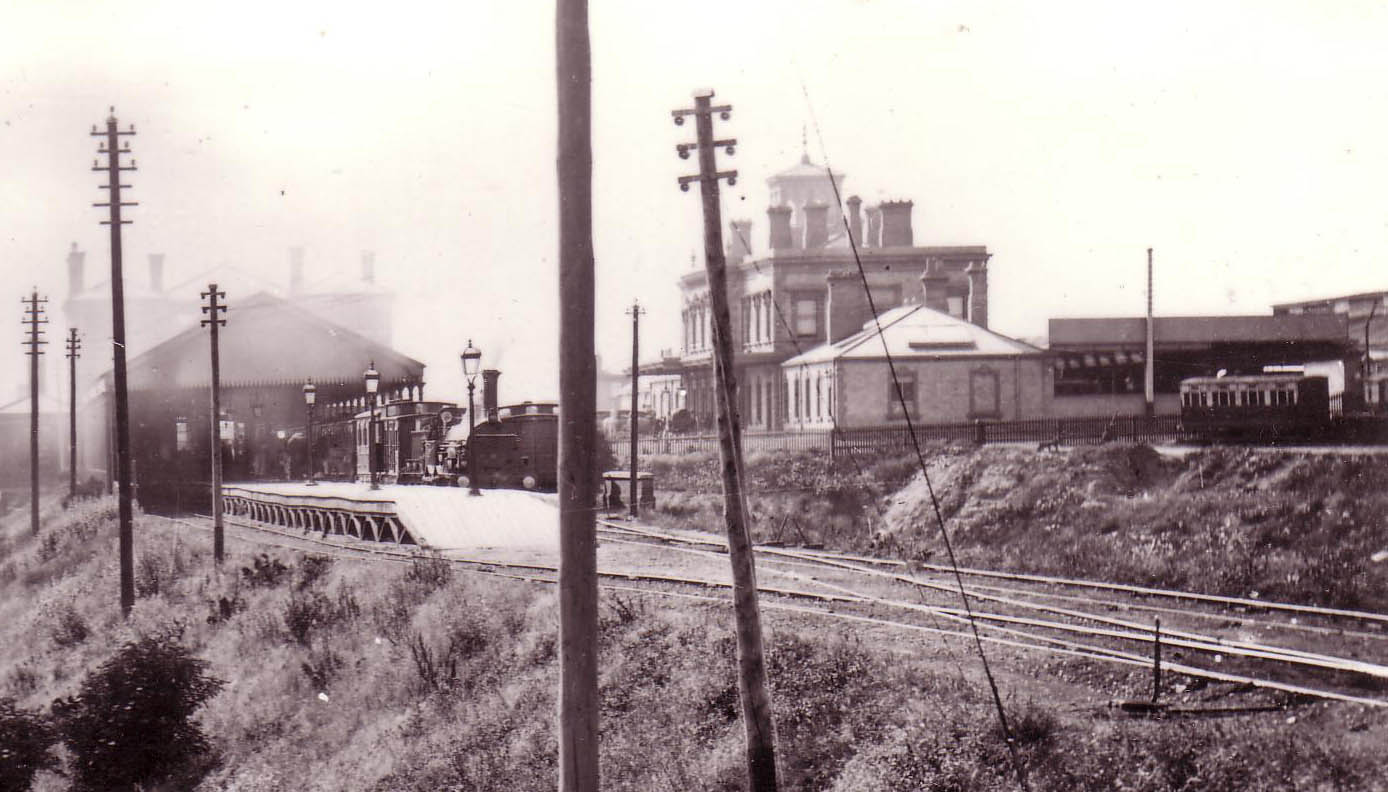
Great Western Railway station (right), South Eastern Railway station (left) in 1865

The first Reading station was opened on 30 March 1840 as the temporary western terminus of the original line of the Great Western Railway (GWR). The time taken to travel from London to Reading was reduced to one hour and five minutes, less than a quarter of the time taken by the fastest stagecoach. The line was extended to its intended terminus at Bristol in 1841. As built, Reading station was a typical Brunel-designed single-sided intermediate station, with separate up and down platforms situated to the south of the through tracks and arranged so that all up trains calling at Reading had to cross the route of all down through trains.

In 1844, the Great Western Hotel was opened across the Forbury Road for people visiting the town. It is thought to be the oldest surviving railway hotel in the world. New routes soon joined the London to Bristol line, with the line from Reading to Newbury and Hungerford opening in 1847, and the line to Basingstoke in 1848.

Between 1865 and 1867, a station building, built of buff bricks from Coalbrookdale with Bath Stone dressings, and incorporating a tower and clock, was constructed for the Great Western Railway. Sources differ as to whether this was a new building, or remodelling of an earlier Brunel building. In 1898 the single sided station layout was replaced by four new island platforms and six bay platforms bringing the total number to ten. The old platform (Platform 1) served the down main line and was widened to 60 ft (18 m) to contain most of the station's amenities as well as three 400 ft-long (120 m) bay platforms at its western end that served Basingstoke and Newbury traffic. Platform 4 served the up main line as one side of a new 1,150 ft (350 m) island platform. The other side, platform 5, became the down line's relief platform. At 50 ft (15 m) across, the island was wide enough to contain refreshment, waiting and cloak rooms as well as a bay platform at each end. The bay at the eastern end (4 East Bay) was for stopping services to London while the west bay (5 West Bay) received Oxford trains. Separated by the down relief loop (fast through line), platform 6 served up relief traffic while its own bay (6 East) at the London end received traffic from the various Great Western branches in the Thames Valley. A string of offices for station staff were built on the other side of the 900 ft (270 m) island to shield passengers from the up and down goods lines that ran adjacent to them. For non-stopping trains, an up loop was laid between platforms 1 and 4 but this was used as a carriage siding until 1908. No down loop was laid for the main line so through trains either had to use the down relief loop or slow down to 40 mph (64 km/h) while passing through the station. A 240 ft (73 m) pedestrian subway was dug to connect these new platforms and at the other end, access was enabled from the north for the first time in the form of a booking office on Caversham road. Access to the platforms was provided by hydraulic lifts powered by water from a new pumping station opened by the Vastern Road bridge. In January 1899 a new booking office was opened in the main station building and all three of Reading's signal boxes were rebuilt.

Access to the station from Broad Street was not direct, until Queen Victoria Street was built in 1903. This provided a route through to Friar Street and Station Road.

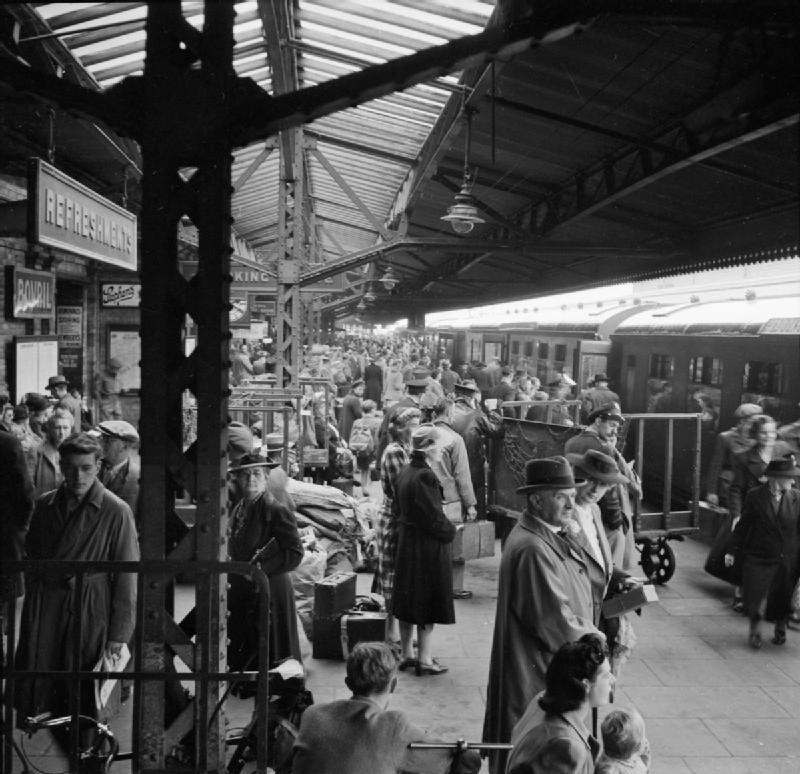
Platform one at Reading railway station in 1945

The station was originally named Reading and became Reading General on 26 September 1949 to distinguish it from the neighbouring ex-South Eastern Railway station. The "General" suffix was dropped from British Rail timetables in 1973, but some of the station nameboards still stated "Reading General" in 1974. The juxtaposition of the two stations meant that the town's buses showed the destination 'Stations'.

=== 1965 combined station ===
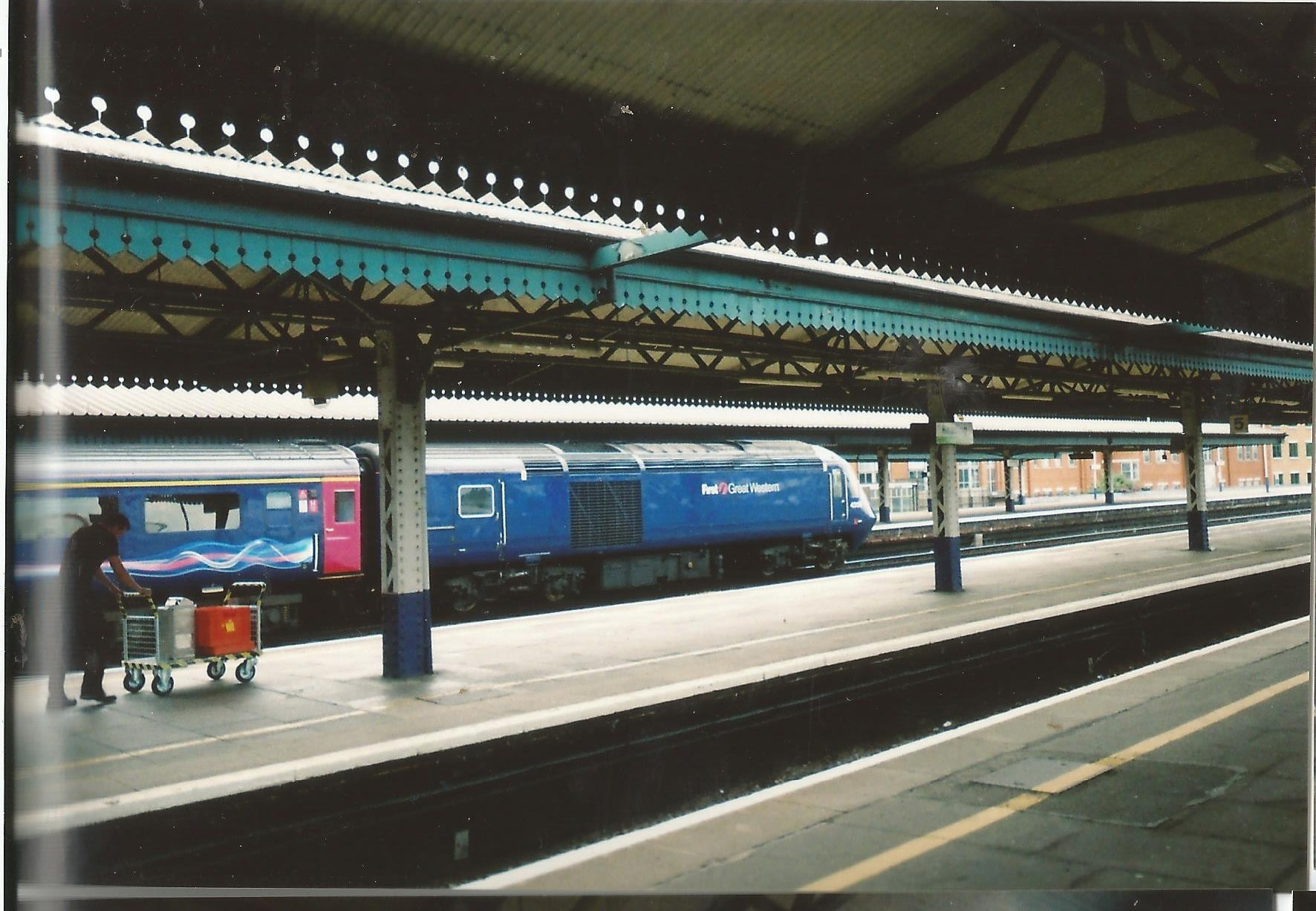
(Before redevelopment) A train stops at Reading on its way from Paddington to Bristol Temple Meads

From 6 September 1965, services from the former Reading Southern station were diverted into a newly constructed terminal platform (4A) in the General station. This was long enough for a single eight coach train, which was later found to be inadequate, and so a second terminal platform (4B) serving the same line was opened in 1975 for the commencement of the service from Reading to Gatwick Airport.

=== 1989 redevelopment ===
In 1989 a brand new station concourse was opened by InterCity, including a shopping arcade named after Brunel, opened on the western end of the old Reading Southern station site, linked to the platforms of the main station by a new footbridge. At the same time a new multi-level station car park was built on the site of the former goods yard and signal works to the north of the station, and linked to the same footbridge. The station facilities in the 1860s station building were converted into The Three Guineas public house. Elizabeth II reopened the station on 4 April 1989.

=== 2009–2015 redevelopment ===
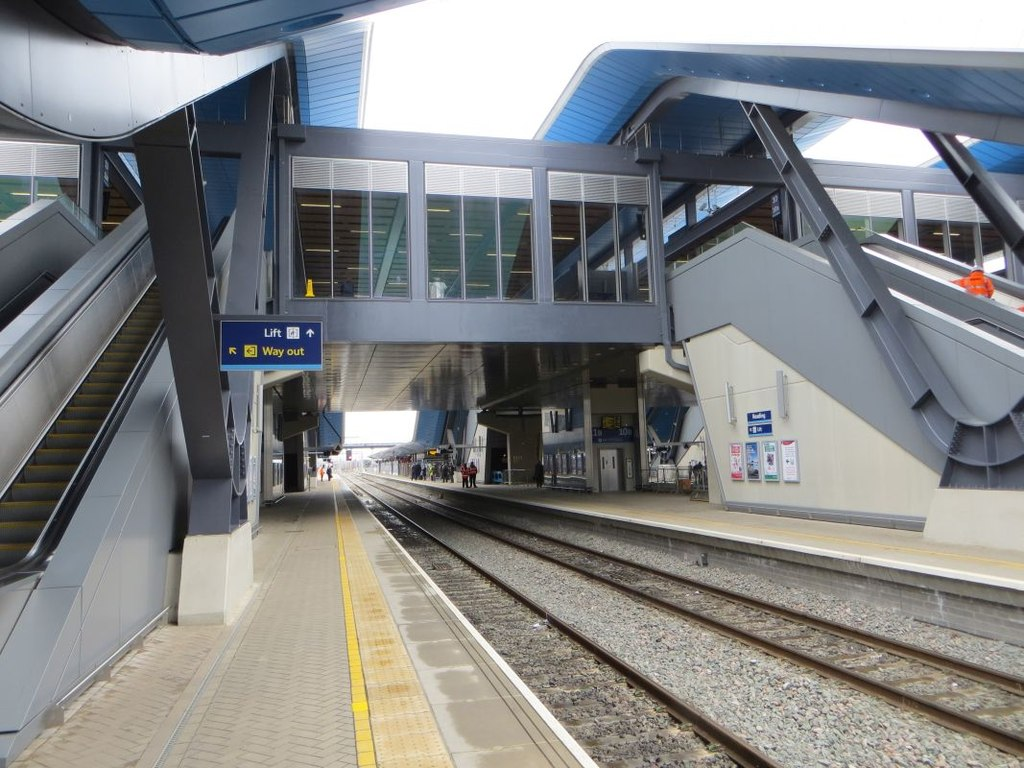
Reading station platforms showing new footbridge

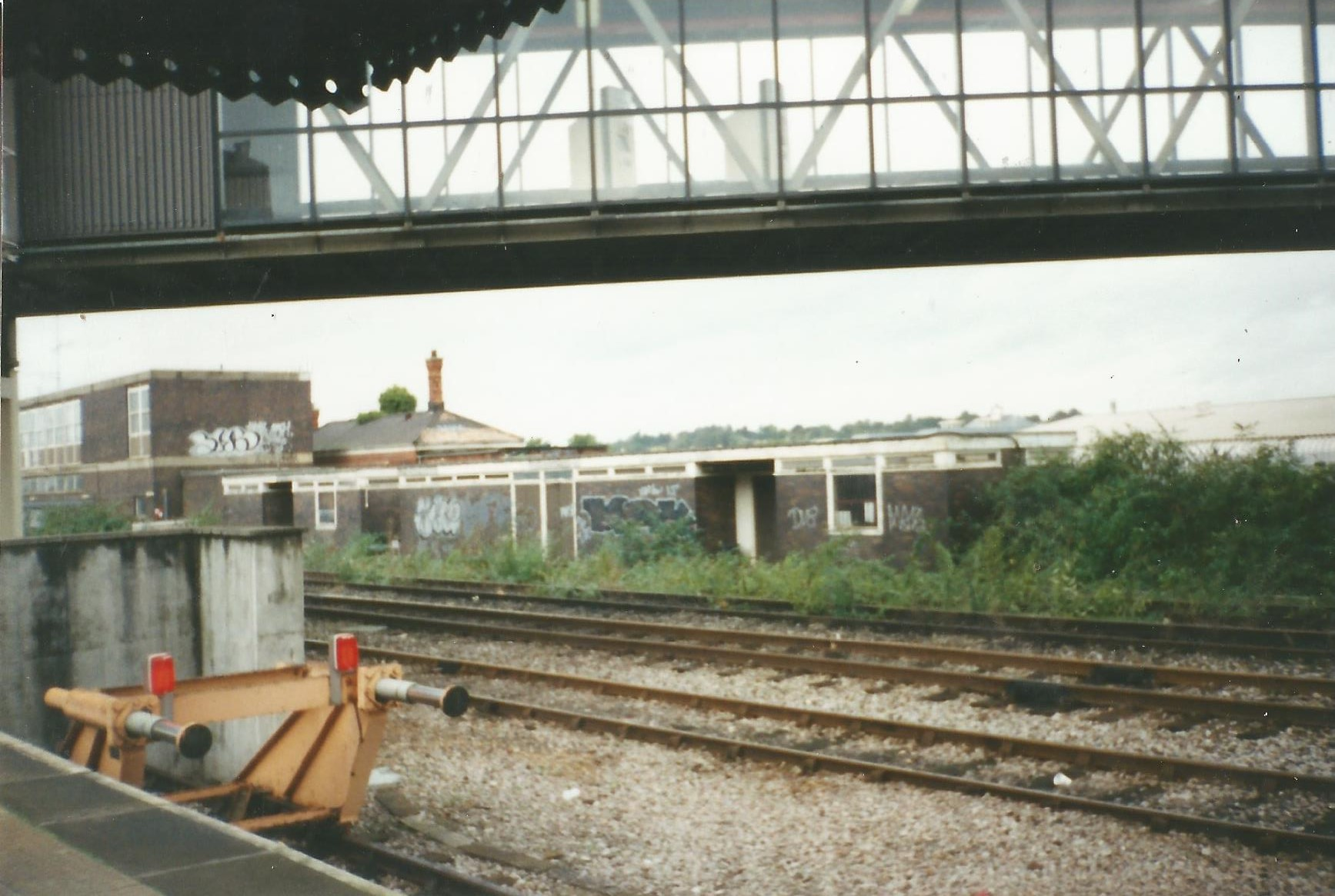
Long demolished staff huts behind the former Platform 10 in 2007

By 2007, the station had become an acknowledged bottleneck on the railway network, with passenger trains often needing to wait outside the station for a platform to become available. This was caused by limited number of through-platforms, the flat junctions immediately east and west of the station and the need for north–south trains to reverse direction in the station. The Great Western Main Line at Reading has two pairs of tracks – the Main ('fast') lines on the southern side and the Relief ('slow') lines on the northern side. Trains transferring between the Relief lines and the lines that run through Reading West (to Taunton and to Basingstoke) had to cross the Main lines. Those trains, especially slow-moving freight trains, blocked the paths of express trains.

In July 2007, in its white paper Delivering a Sustainable Railway, the government announced plans to improve traffic flow at Reading, specifically mentioned along with Birmingham New Street station as "key congestion pinch-points" which would share investment worth £600 million. On 10 September 2008 Network Rail unveiled a £400 million regeneration and reconfiguration of the station and surrounding track to reduce delays. The following changes were made:

- Five new platforms: Four new through platforms on the northern side and an extra bay platform for the Wokingham lines.
- A new footbridge on the western side of the station, replacing the 1989 footbridge. This also included a new entrance on the southern side, for ticket holders only.
- A new street-level entrance and ticket office on the northern side of the station.
- The original subway was converted into a pedestrian underpass between the two sides of the station, with no access to the platforms.
- Making the Cow Lane bridge under the tracks two-way with a cycle path.
- A flyover to the west of the station for trains to allow fast trains to cross over the lines to Reading West, replacing the flat junction.
- A section of track beneath the flyover to provide a connection between Reading West and the relief lines.

The redevelopment was designed to provide provision for future Crossrail and Heathrow Airtrack services at Reading station.

The improvements have allowed capacity for at least 4 extra trains in each direction every hour and 6 extra freight trains a day (equivalent to 200 lorries). The local council has also planned developments of the surrounding area in association with the developments at the station.

The cost of the project rose to £897m, but it was completed a year earlier than expected. The rebuilt station was reopened by Queen Elizabeth II on 17 July 2014.

Network Rail took over management of the station from First Great Western in April 2014.

Electrification of the Great Western main line through Reading station was completed in time for electric trains to commence service between Paddington and Didcot Parkway on 2 January 2018.

== Motive power depot ==
The GWR built a small engine shed in the junction of the lines to Didcot and those to Basingstoke in 1841. This was enlarged and rebuilt in 1876 and again in 1930. It was closed by British Railways in 1965 and replaced by a purpose-built Traction Maintenance Depot. This was subsequently relocated by Network Rail, during the redevelopment works in the early 2010s, to the northern side of the tracks to the west of the station.

== Accidents and incidents ==
Extreme weather was the cause of an early casualty in the station's history. On 24 March 1840, whilst the station was nearing completion, 24-year-old Henry West was working on the station roof when a freak wind (described at the time as a tornado) lifted that section of the roof, carrying it and West around 200 feet (61 m) away; West was killed. On the wall of the main station building there is a brass plaque, commemorating the event.

On 12 September 1855, a light engine was dispatched on the wrong line. It was in a head-in collision with a passenger train. Four people were killed and many were injured.

An accident occurred at Reading on 17 June 1914, and was witnessed by the railway historian O. S. Nock, then a schoolboy. The driver of a train to Ascot moved off even though the signal was at 'danger', and into the path of an oncoming train bound for London Paddington; the only fatality was the driver of the Paddington train.

T. E. Lawrence (Lawrence of Arabia) lost the 250,000-word first draft of his Seven Pillars of Wisdom at the station when he left his briefcase while changing trains in 1919. Working from memory, as he had destroyed his notes after completion of the first draft, he then completed a 400,000-word second draft in three months.

German aircraft tried to bomb the lines into the station during the beginning of World War II.

On 1 August 1990, Class 119 diesel multiple unit L576 collided with a passenger train comprising 4VEP electric multiple units 3508 & 3504, and 4CIG unit 1304 due to overrunning signals. Forty people were injured.

On 23 October 1993, an IRA bomb exploded at a signal post near the station, some hours after 5 lb (2 kg) of Semtex was found in the toilets of the station. The resulting closure of the railway line and evacuation of the station caused travel chaos for several hours, but no-one was injured.

== Location ==
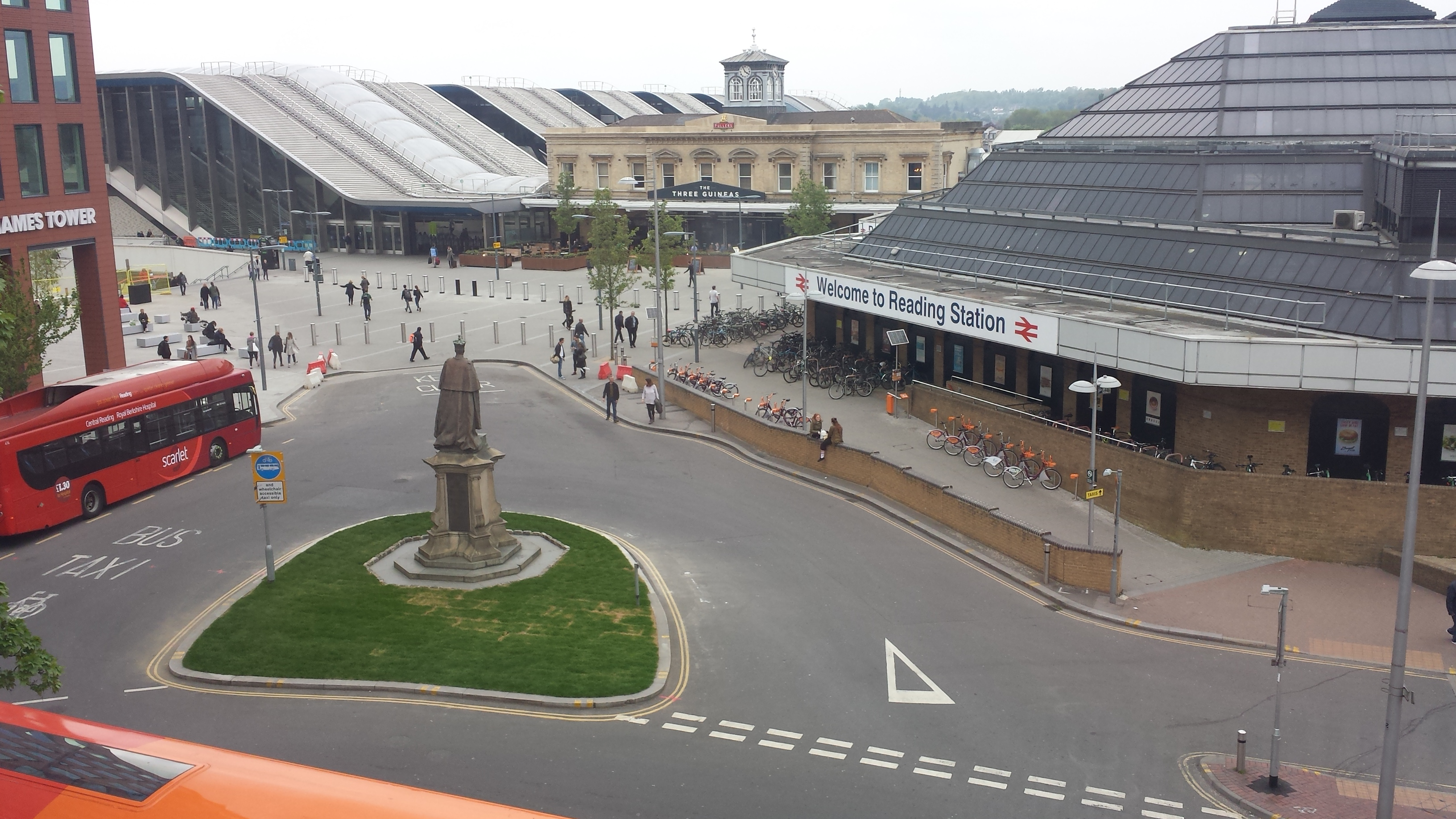
The new Station Square in 2017, with (from left to right) Thames Tower offices, the 2014 entrance and bridge concourse, the 1860 station building (now serving as a pub), and the 1989 station building (on the site of the Southern station)

The station is on the northern side of central Reading. Since its most recent redevelopment, it now has two principal entrance facades, one facing south to the town centre and the other north to the River Thames. These are linked to each other and to the platforms for passengers by a transfer bridge (a broad covered overbridge with shops). Outside the ticket barriers they are also linked by the former station subway, which has been converted into a public pedestrian and cycle route.

The southern facade hosts two entrances, one either side of the Three Guineas pub that occupies the original 1860s station building. These provide access to a multi-level streetscape, with a pedestrianised Station Square at the higher level and the taxi rank at a lower level. This streetscape is surrounded by the new Station Hill development, Thames Tower and the Malmaison Hotel.

The northern facade has a single entrance, providing access to a second taxi rank, a bus interchange used by buses heading across the river to and from Caversham, and to the station multi-storey car park. These in turn connect to the town's Inner Distribution Road.

In the chainage notation traditionally used on the railway, the station's location on the Great Western main line is 35 miles 78 chains (35.98 mi; 57.90 km) from Paddington.

== Station layout ==
=== Since 2013 ===
The station has fifteen platforms. The nine through-platforms are numbered 7–15, each split into "a" (eastern end) and "b" (western end) sections. Platforms 7–11 are on the main (fast) lines, whereas 12–15 are on the relief (slow) lines. Relief line platforms 13–15 have access to the underpass for services to London Waterloo and Gatwick Airport.

Reading station platform usage since 2013
Platform(s)	Type	Facing	Used by
1; 2	bay	west	Local Reading to Taunton line services to and from Basingstoke, Newbury and Bedwyn
3	bay	west	Cross Country services to and from the north (reverse or terminate at Reading); Cross Country services to and from the south (reverse or terminate at Reading)
4; 5; 6	bay	east	Services to and from London Waterloo; North Downs line services to and from Guildford, Redhill and Gatwick Airport; Third-rail electrified
7	through	—	Great Western Main Line services; Westbound Reading to Taunton line services; Cross Country services to and from the north (reverse at Reading); Cross Country services to and from the south (reverse at Reading)
8	through	—	Great Western Main Line services; Westbound Cherwell Valley line services via Oxford; Westbound Cotswold Line line services via Oxford; Westbound Reading to Taunton line services; Cross Country services to and from the north (reverse at Reading); Cross Country services to and from the south (reverse at Reading)
9	through	—	Westbound Great Western Main Line main line services; Westbound Cherwell Valley line services via Oxford; Westbound Cotswold Line line services via Oxford
10; 11	through	—	Eastbound Great Western Main Line main line services to London Paddington; Eastbound Cherwell Valley line services to London Paddington; Eastbound Cotswold Line line services to London Paddington; Eastbound Reading to Taunton line services to London Paddington
12; 13; 14; 15	through	—	Relief lines; Elizabeth line to Abbey Wood (terminus)

=== 1975–2013 ===
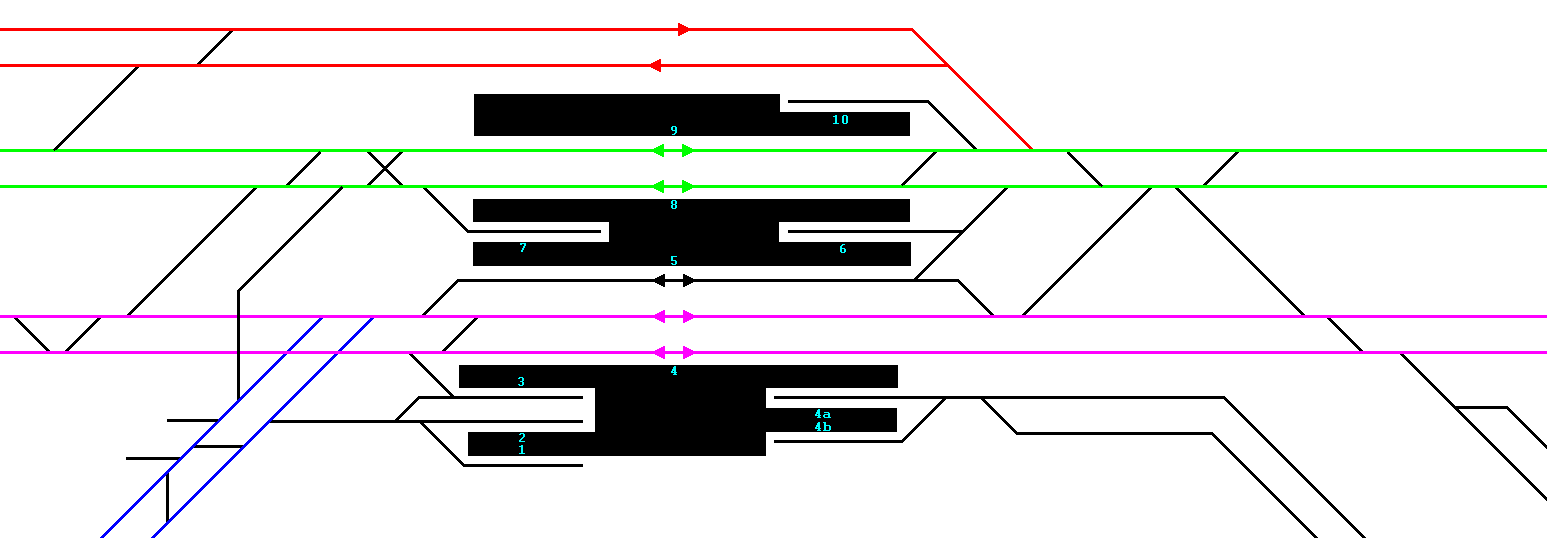
Track layout prior to 27 December 2011: — / Main (Bristol-Paddington) lines; — / Westbury lines / — / Goods lines; — / Relief lines / — / Other lines

Between 1975 and 2011, Reading station had four through-platforms and eight terminal platforms.

Reading station platform usage and renumbering immediately prior to 27 December 2011
Platform(s)	Type	Facing	Used by	2011 renumbering
1; 2; 3	bay	west	Westbound Reading to Taunton line local services to Basingstoke, Newbury and Bedwyn	—
4	through	—	Westbound Great Western Main Line from London Paddington services	7
4a; 4b	bay	east	Eastbound services to London Waterloo; Southbound North Downs line services to Guildford, Redhill and Gatwick Airport; Third-rail electrified	6; 5
5	through	—	Eastbound Great Western Main Line services to London Paddington	8
6	bay	east	Great Western Main Line local services to and from London Paddington (terminus)	16, later removed
7	bay	west	Cross Country services to and from the north (terminate at Reading)	removed
8	through	—	Westbound local services from London Paddington to Oxford; Cross Country services to and from the north and south; Relief for platform 5	9
9	through	—	Eastbound local services from Oxford to London Paddington; Eastbound fast services to Ealing Broadway and London Paddington	10
10	bay	east	Eastbound local services to London Paddington; Eastbound local services to Henley-on-Thames	11, later converted to through platform

On 27 December 2011, the new platform 4 was opened, with all higher numbered platforms re-numbered:

- main line platforms 4 and 5 became 7 and 8
- relief line platforms 8 and 9 became 9 and 10
- the north bay became platform 11
- bay platform 6, which would be removed later in the redevelopment, was renumbered 16

Platform 5 (old 4b) opened on 23 April 2012, with platform 6 (old 4a) following on 12 July. The Easter 2013 blockade resulted in the opening of new platforms 12 to 15 and the closure of the old east bay platform 16. Work then commenced to rebuild platform 11 into a through platform, following which the adjacent platform 10 was rebuilt to match.

In March 2013 the subway reopened as a public right of way from the north to the south of the station, with no platform access. This enabled removal of the old footbridge to commence, starting with the two sections nearest the car park which were lifted out in the first two weeks of that month. On 29 March 2013 the new transfer deck was opened, ready for the opening of the new platforms on 2 April. By 7 April 2013 the old footbridge had been completely removed.

=== Recycling of infrastructure ===
During the station's major reconstruction, and the associated moving of locomotive stabling and the servicing depot from south of the Great Western Main Line to its north, a number of major components either became redundant or were no longer needed. Network Rail offered these to museums and the railway preservation movement, for a zero price, but subject to the cost of delivery being recompensed. In April 2011, the pair of 17-metre (56 ft) former road bridges to the west of the station were delivered to Loughborough Central on the Great Central Railway for future use on their bridging project. In January 2014 one of the 22,500-imperial-gallon (102,000 L; 27,000 US gal) water tanks was moved to Bishops Lydeard on the West Somerset Railway.

== Services ==
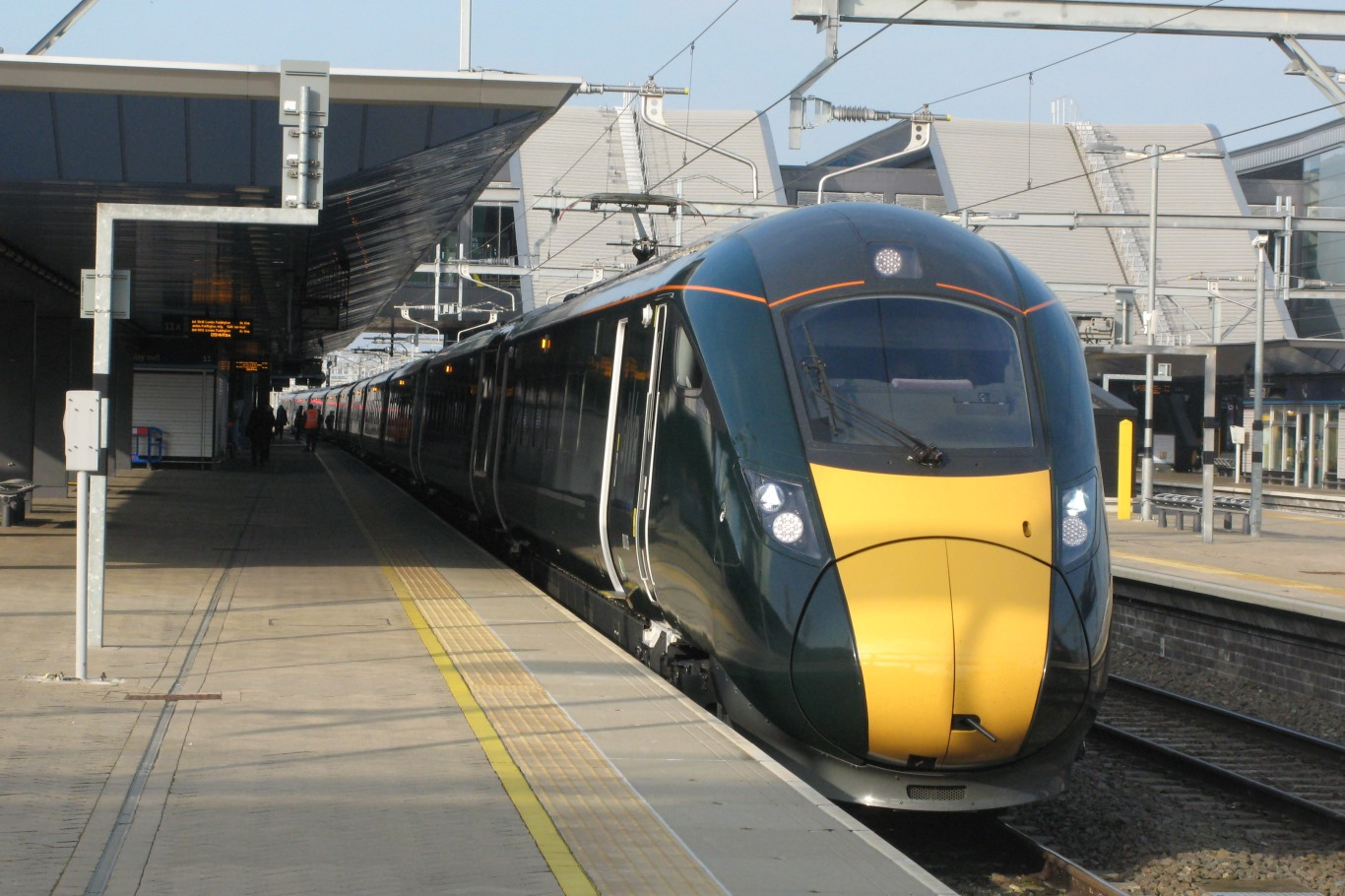
A Great Western Railway Class 800 with a service to London Paddington in 2018

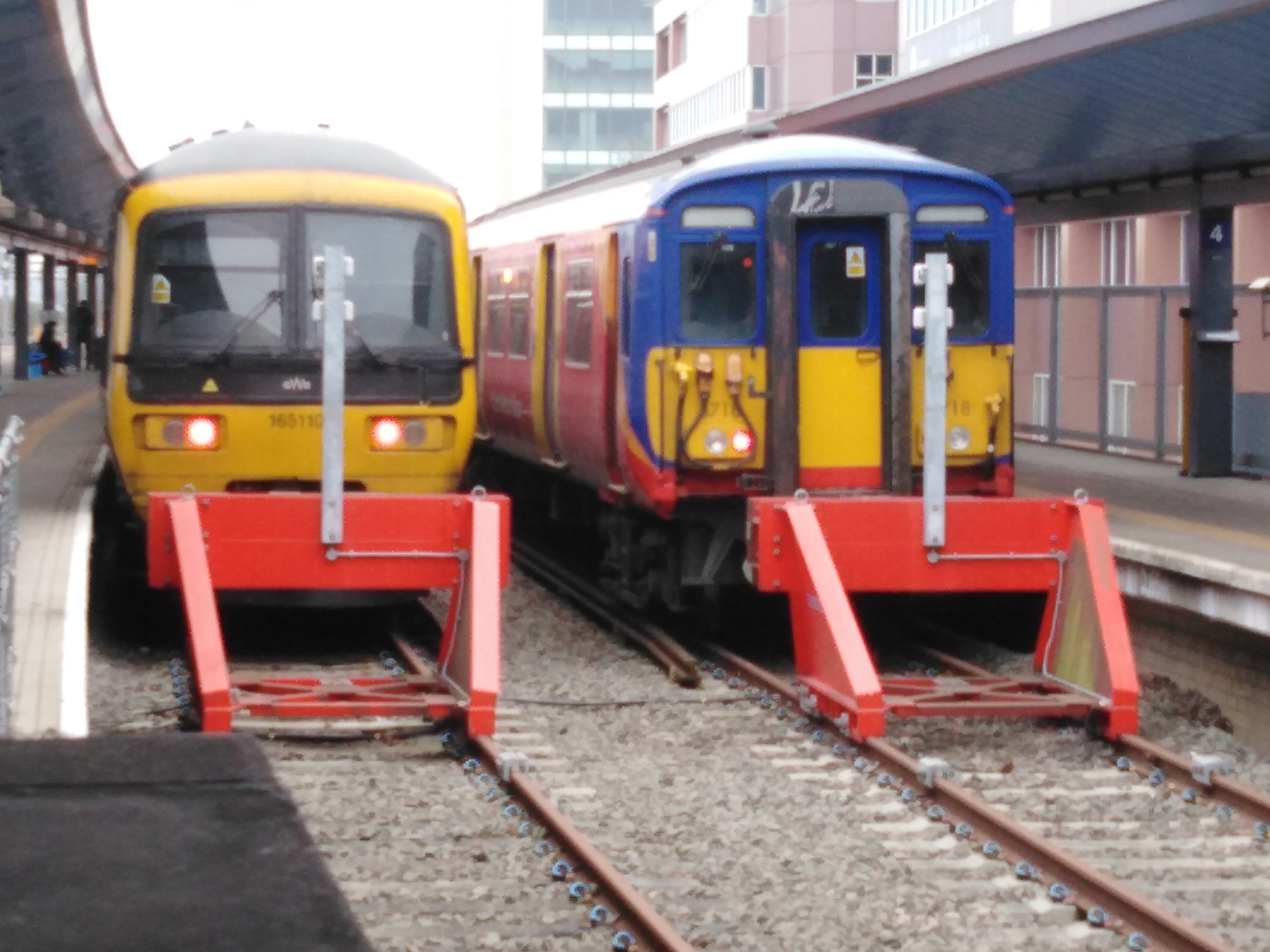
Class 165 DMU and Class 455 EMU at Reading's third rail electrified platforms in 2021

The station plays a key role in serving the Great Western Main Line, the line which runs west from London Paddington station to Reading. To the west of Reading station, the line splits into two branches, allowing it to serve a variety of communities in the West and South West of England and onward into South Wales. The main branch proceeds to Bristol Temple Meads, via Bath Spa, Chippenham and Swindon. The South Wales Main Line diverges from the main branch at Swindon with trains running via Bristol Parkway, Newport, Cardiff Central, Bridgend, Port Talbot Parkway, and Neath to and from Swansea. Some services on the Great Western Main Line terminate at Bristol, while others continue on the Bristol to Exeter line towards the West Country. The other branch to the west of Reading station is the Reading to Taunton line (the "Berks and Hants" line), which serves communities in Berkshire, Wiltshire and Somerset. High speed services on this line do not normally call at all stations along the route (except sometimes Newbury and Hungerford), and some express services from the South West operate non-stop between Paddington and Taunton. The Reading to Taunton branch joins services travelling south from Bristol on the Bristol to Exeter line at Cogload Junction, to the north of Taunton. The line proceeds to serve the stations of Taunton, Exeter St Davids, Plymouth and onward to stations in Cornwall such as Par where the branch to Newquay diverges where some trains terminate whilst most terminate at the terminus of Penzance. Both high-speed intercity services and local services are operated by Great Western Railway. Nearly all services are timetabled to stop at Reading.

Other main lines connect Reading with Birmingham New Street, Birmingham International and northern England, and with Basingstoke, Winchester, Southampton Central and Bournemouth to the south. Through services from north to south on these lines are operated by CrossCountry, and all services stop at Reading, which requires the trains to reverse in the station. The main routes offered by CrossCountry are to Newcastle and Manchester Piccadilly to the north and Southampton Central and Bournemouth in the south.

The Elizabeth line operates a service to Abbey Wood, stopping at most stations to Ealing Broadway. On Sunday mornings and Sunday nights, trains terminate at London Paddington instead.

The secondary North Downs Line connects Reading with Guildford, Reigate, Redhill and Gatwick Airport. Services on this line, together with local stopping services to Basingstoke, Newbury, Bedwyn, Didcot Parkway and London Paddington, are also operated by Great Western Railway. An electric suburban line operated by South Western Railway links Reading to Wokingham, Bracknell, Ascot, Staines, Richmond, Clapham Junction and London Waterloo.

Pending the construction of the direct rail route to Heathrow Airport, an express bus service, RailAir, links Reading to London Heathrow Airport, as do suburban services via Hayes & Harlington.

Preceding station	National Rail	Following station
Basingstoke	CrossCountry; Bournemouth or Southampton to Manchester	Oxford
Terminus	CrossCountry; Reading–Newcastle	Oxford
Wokingham	Great Western Railway; North Downs Line	Terminus
Twyford	Great Western Railway; Great Western Main Line	Tilehurst
London Paddington	Great Western Railway; Great Western Main Line	Swindon
London Paddington	Great Western Railway; Great Western Main Line	Didcot Parkway
London Paddington	Great Western Railway; Great Western Main Line	Oxford
London Paddington	Great Western Railway; Night Riviera	Taunton
London Paddington	Great Western Railway; Reading–Taunton line	Taunton
London Paddington	Great Western Railway; Reading–Taunton line	Newbury
London Paddington	Great Western Railway; Reading–Taunton line	Theale
Terminus	Great Western Railway; Reading–Taunton line	Reading West
Terminus	Great Western Railway; Reading–Basingstoke	Reading West
Earley	South Western Railway; Waterloo to Reading	Terminus
Preceding station	Elizabeth line	Following station
Twyford towards Abbey Wood	Elizabeth line	Terminus

== Proposed Heathrow Airport links ==
Reading station was intended to be the western terminus for the proposed Heathrow Airtrack rail service. This project, promoted by BAA, envisaged the construction of a spur from the Waterloo to Reading Line to Heathrow Airport, creating direct rail links from the airport to Reading, London Waterloo, Woking and Guildford. Airtrack was cancelled by BAA in April 2011 but, in October 2011, Wandsworth Council announced a revised plan called Airtrack-Lite.

More recently, the Government has committed to the construction of a rail route from Heathrow Terminal 5 to the GWR main line between Iver and Langley, with a west-facing junction there, thus providing for a direct route from Heathrow to the West. Great Western Railway will run this route when completed in 2027, connecting up with the Elizabeth Line branch and replacing the Heathrow Express. See Western Rail Link to Heathrow.
