= Station Hill development, Reading =

Station Hill
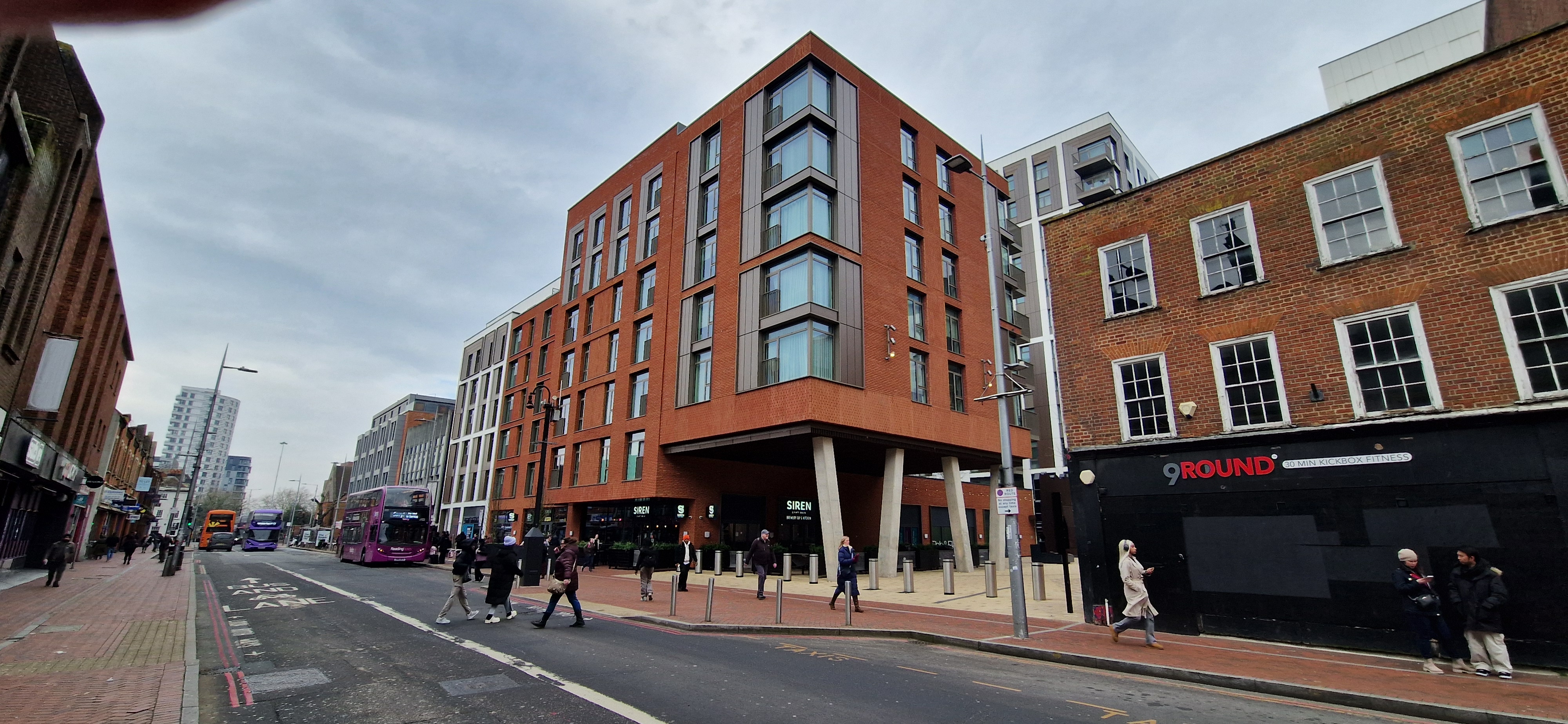
- Entrance to the Station Hill development in 2025

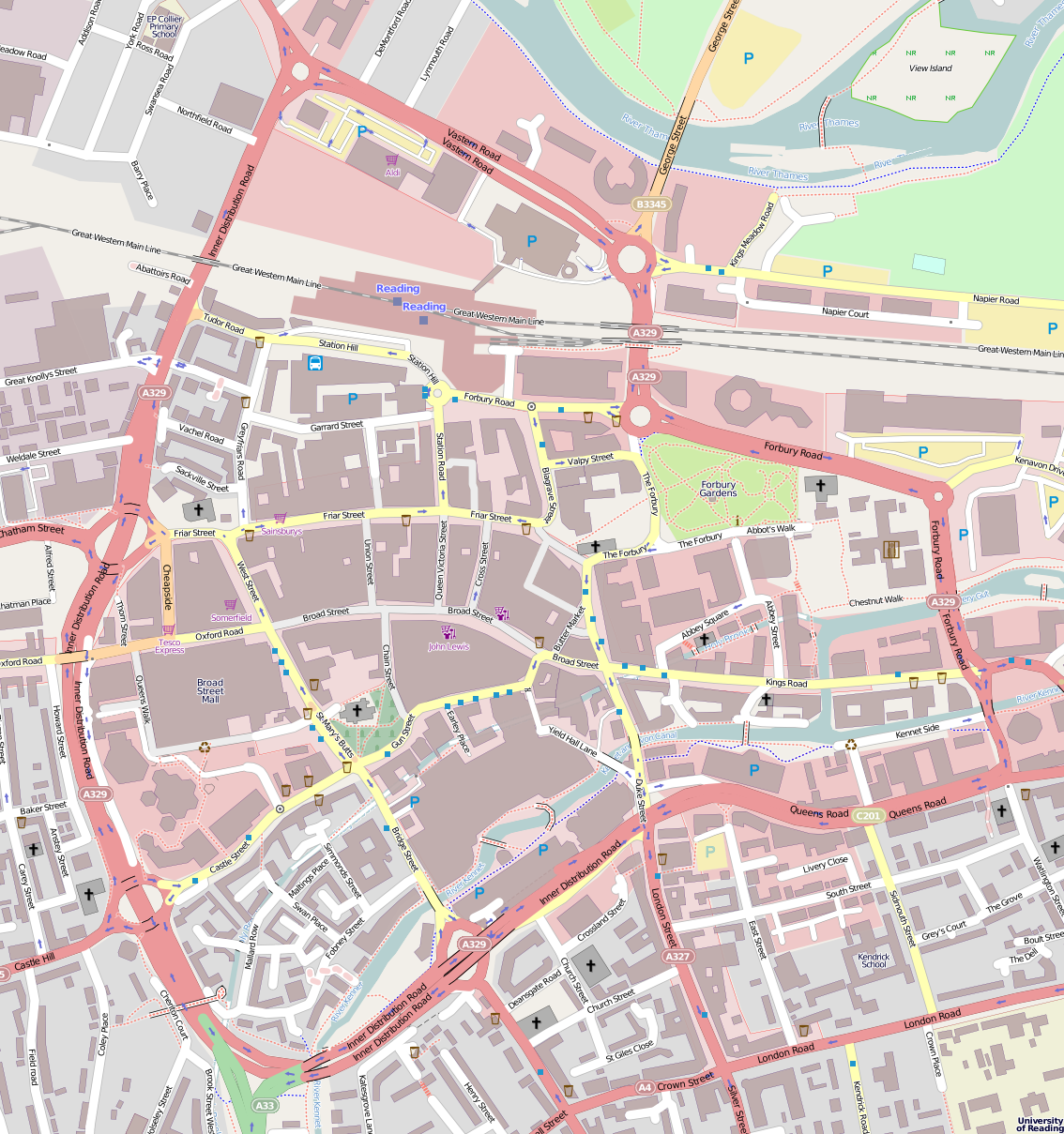
- Location within Reading Central

General information
- Type: Residential, Office, Retail and Lifestyle
- Location: Station Hill, Reading, England
- Coordinates: 51.45763°N 0.974212°W
- Completed: 2024 (first two phases)
- Cost: £750 million
- Owner: Lincoln MGT

Design and construction
- Architects: CallisonRTKL and Gensler

Website
- www.stationhill.co.uk

The Station Hill development is an ongoing redevelopment project in Reading, England. It occupies a site between Friar Street and Station Hill in the centre of Reading, and takes its name from the latter. It is a mixed development, with several apartment blocks aligned towards Friar Street, and (as yet) one office tower aligned towards the station. The development is linked together by Friar's Walk, an open air pedestrian walkway between the two streets that spans the intermediate Garrard Street on a bridge. At its Station Hill end, the development is adjacent to Thames Tower and the Reading railway station.

As of 2025, the first phase (Friars Walk) has been completed, with the second phase nearing completion. The eventual development will comprise up to 625,000 square feet (58,100 m^{2}) of office space, 1,300 private and affordable homes, 95,000 square feet (8,800 m^{2}) of new lifestyle-led retail and leisure space, including potential for a 200-bed hotel and later living accommodation, and a central 2-acre (0.81 ha) piazza.

== History ==
=== Proposals ===
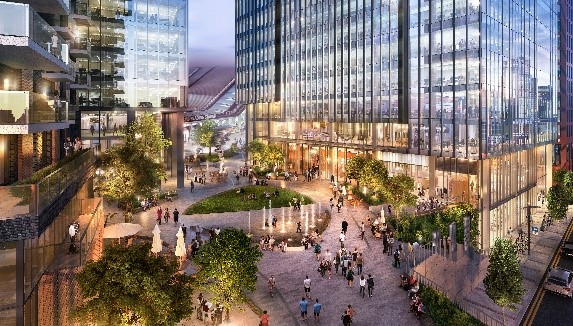
CGI rendering of Station Hill

A redevelopment of the land, then occupied by the disused Friars Walk shopping centre, bus station and former British Railways Western Tower offices, was initially proposed by Reading entrepreneur John Madejski, who bought the site in 2005.

In 2012, the Station Hill project passed to a joint venture between Benson Elliot and Stanhope. In February, they released a new £400m plan to be displayed to the public. After the exhibition at the Town Hall, the developers said that the plans had received a positive response.

As of June 2018, Station Hill became a joint venture between Lincoln Property Company and MGT Investment Management (known as Lincoln MGT). The BBC reported that the development was bought for close to £70 million from Sackville Developments.

=== Construction ===
The development was split into three phases, with construction for the first two phases underway as of 2022 and the third having received outline planning permission. Phase one and two were completed in 2024 and opened to the public, with the first three companies, PepsiCo, PWC and Proactis Ltd opening offices in 2025. On 21 June 2025, the area officially launched with the 'Party on the Hill'.

== Incidents ==
On 23 November 2023, a fire broke out on a 16-storey office building in the development. A worker was notably saved by a cage attached to a crane and two people were treated for smoke inhalation. It is unknown how the fire began and the investigations were ongoing one year on.
