= The Three Guineas, Reading =

Grade II listed pub at Reading railway station, Reading, UK

The Three Guineas
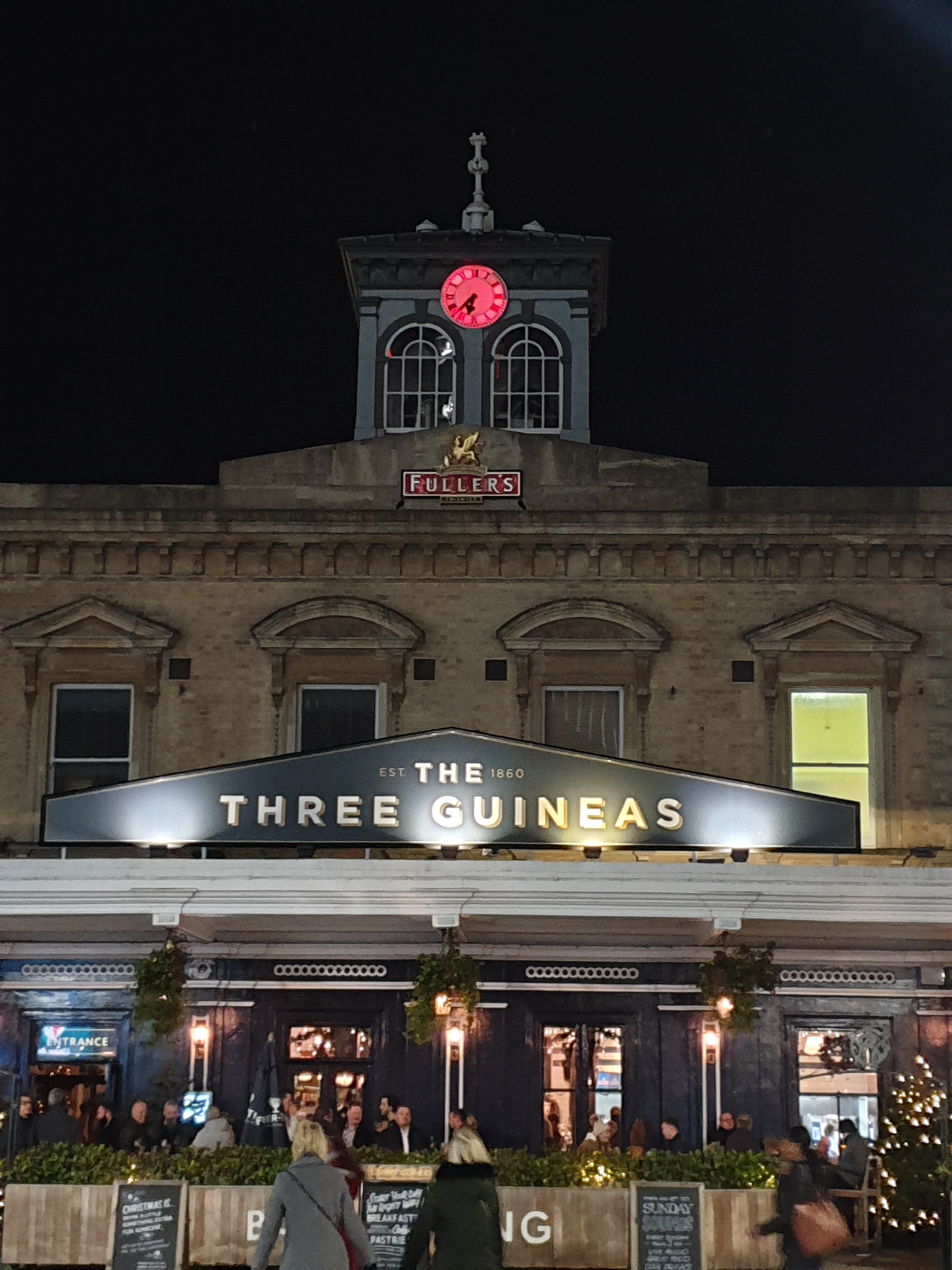

General information
- Location: Station Square, Reading
- Coordinates: 51.45876°N 0.97224°W

Website
- www.three-guineas.co.uk

The Three Guineas is a Grade II listed public house located at Reading railway station, in Reading, England. It occupies a building originally built in, or before, 1867. Until 1989, the building formed the main entrance and booking hall of the station, and consequently is listed as the Main Building Of Reading General Station.

The pub is owned and operated by Fuller, Smith & Turner, trading under the Fuller's brand. It has two main floors, plus a basement and a centrally located clock tower. There are bars on both the ground floor and in the basement, together with a large outdoor seating area that forms part of Station Square.

== History ==
The first Reading station was opened on 30 March 1840 as the temporary western terminus of the original line of the Great Western Railway (GWR). The line was extended to its intended terminus at Bristol in 1841. As built, Reading station was a typical Isambard Kingdom Brunel designed single-sided intermediate station, with separate up and down platforms situated to the south of the through tracks and arranged so that all up trains calling at Reading had to cross the route of all down through trains. Between 1865 and 1867, a station building, built of buff bricks from Coalbrookdale with Bath Stone dressings, and incorporating a tower and clock, was constructed for the GWR. Sources differ as to whether this was a new building, or remodelling of an earlier Brunel building.

The building was granted grade II listed status in 1976.

In 1989 a brand new station concourse was opened by British Rail, including a new booking hall. The station facilities in the 1860s station building were converted into a pub. This was given the name The Three Guineas in memory of a competition, run in July 1904, to name the GWR's new non-stop express train to Plymouth and Penzance. The competition prize, proclaimed in banner headlines, was ”Three Golden Guineas”. History records that there were two winning entries, The Cornish Riviera Limited and The Riviera Express, which the GWR combined as The Cornish Riviera Express, but the names of the winners are lost to time.

In 2016, Fuller's announced that the pub would undergo a major renovation. It reopened on 30 January 2017 with a remodelled main bar and altered kitchen layout. The previously unused basement of the station building was converted into a secondary cellar bar.
