= Thames Tower =

Office building in Reading, United Kingdom

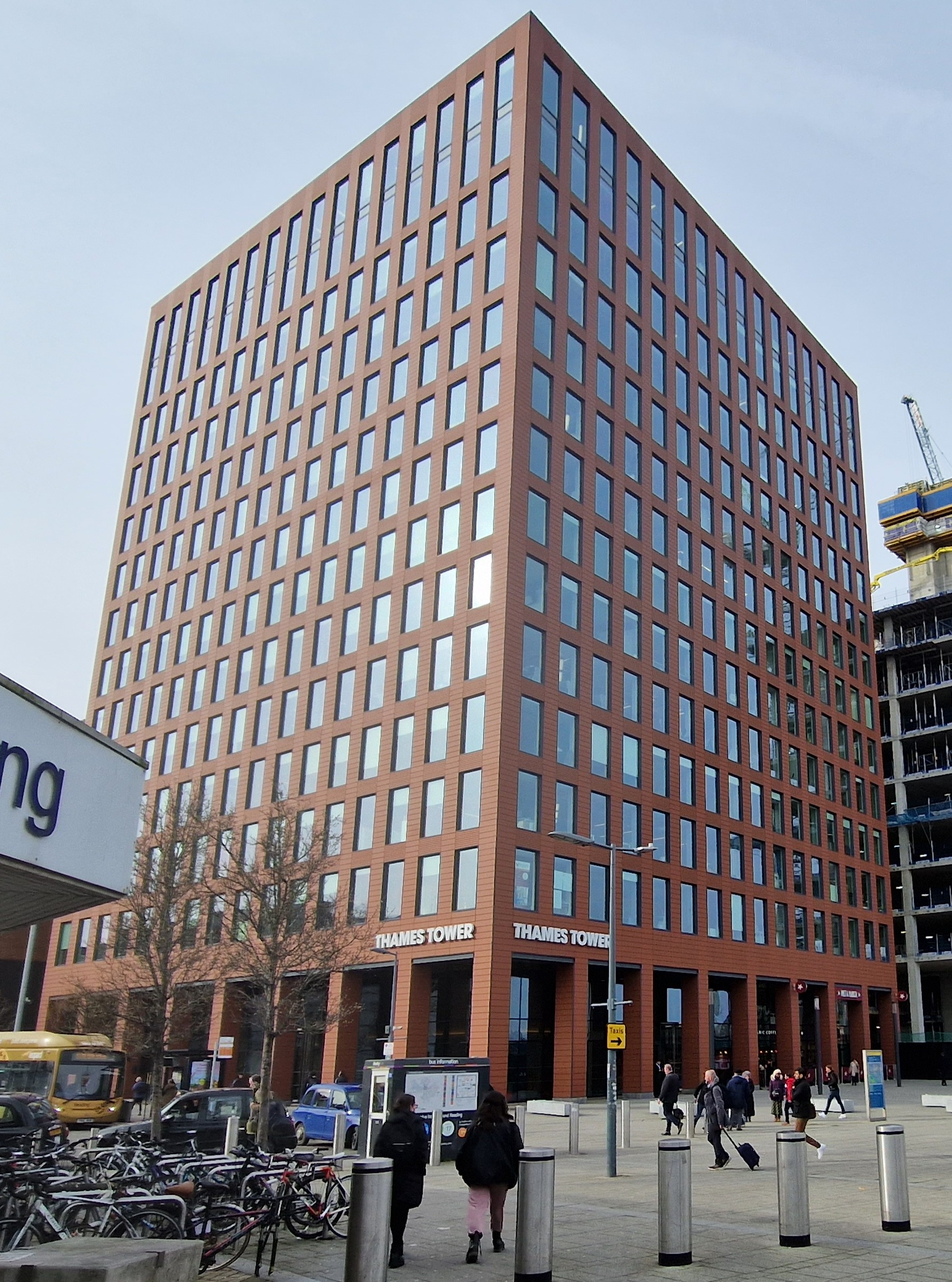
- Thames Tower in 2023
- Interactive map of the Thames Tower area

General information
- Location: Reading, UK
- Coordinates: 51°27′28.65″N 0°58′21.87″W
- Completed: 1974
- Renovated: 2016
- Owner: Spelthorne Borough Council

Height
- Height: 55 metres (180 feet)

Technical details
- Floor count: 15

Design and construction
- Architecture firm: De Novo Architects (2016)

Thames Tower is an office building in Reading, UK. It is located in front of Reading railway station and adjacent to the new Station Hill development.

== History ==
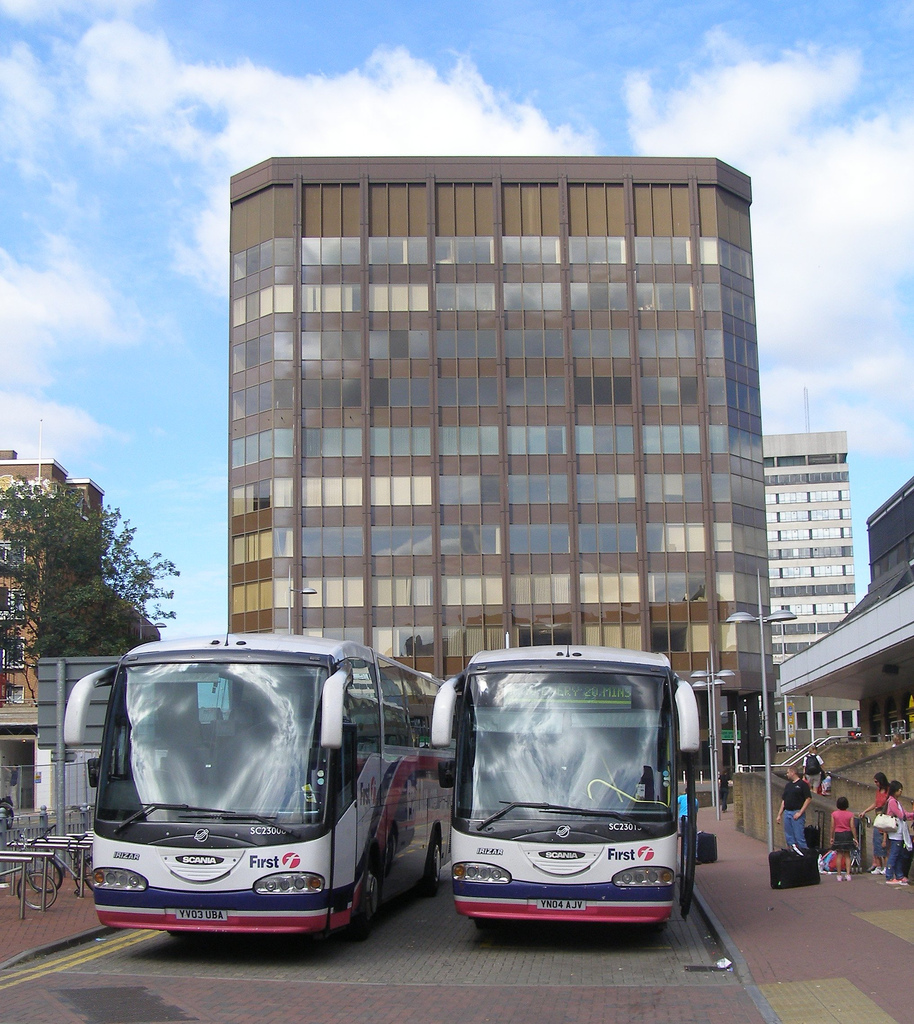
The building prior to renovation

Thames Tower was completed in 1974. In September 2010, it was vacated. In June 2012, LaSalle Investment Management announced plans to demolish Thames Tower and replace it with a new 25-storey building which would be completed in 2015. However, in 2013 LaSelle Investment Management announced that it would instead refurbish the building as it was no longer confident that it could fill the new building while charging sufficient rent to fund its construction.

In January 2014, the building was purchased by Brockton Capital and Landid Property. The joint venture announced in July, refurbished the building and added an additional four floors increasing its height from 45 metres (148 feet) to 55 metres (180 feet). As part of this retrofit all new wall and floor coverings were installed; specifically those of prefabricated timber slat wall and ceiling panels. The refurbished building opened in May 2016.

In August 2018, the building was purchased by Spelthorne Borough Council. The ground floor level also contains a Pret a Manger, which is open to the public.
