= Giulio Monteverde =

Italian sculptor (1837–1917)

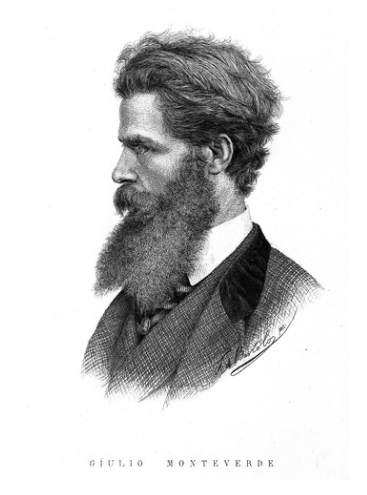
Giulio Monteverde, portrait etching by Francesco Di Bartolo

Giulio Monteverde (8 October 1837 – 3 October 1917) was an Italian sculptor, teacher and senator of the Kingdom of Italy.

== Biography ==
Giulio Monteverde was born in Bistagno, in Piedmont. He began his artistic training as an apprentice woodcarver and first worked as a carver, producing religious works including crucifixes. In 1857 he moved to Genoa, where he attended the Accademia Ligustica di Belle Arti while continuing to work as a woodcarver. At the Accademia Ligustica he studied under Santo Varni. In 1865, after winning the Pensione Durazzo, he moved to Rome for further study.

Monteverde’s early reputation was established through works inspired by childhood, scientific progress and modern civic subjects, including Bambini che giocano con il gatto, Colombo giovinetto, Genio di Franklin and Jenner vaccinating his son against smallpox.

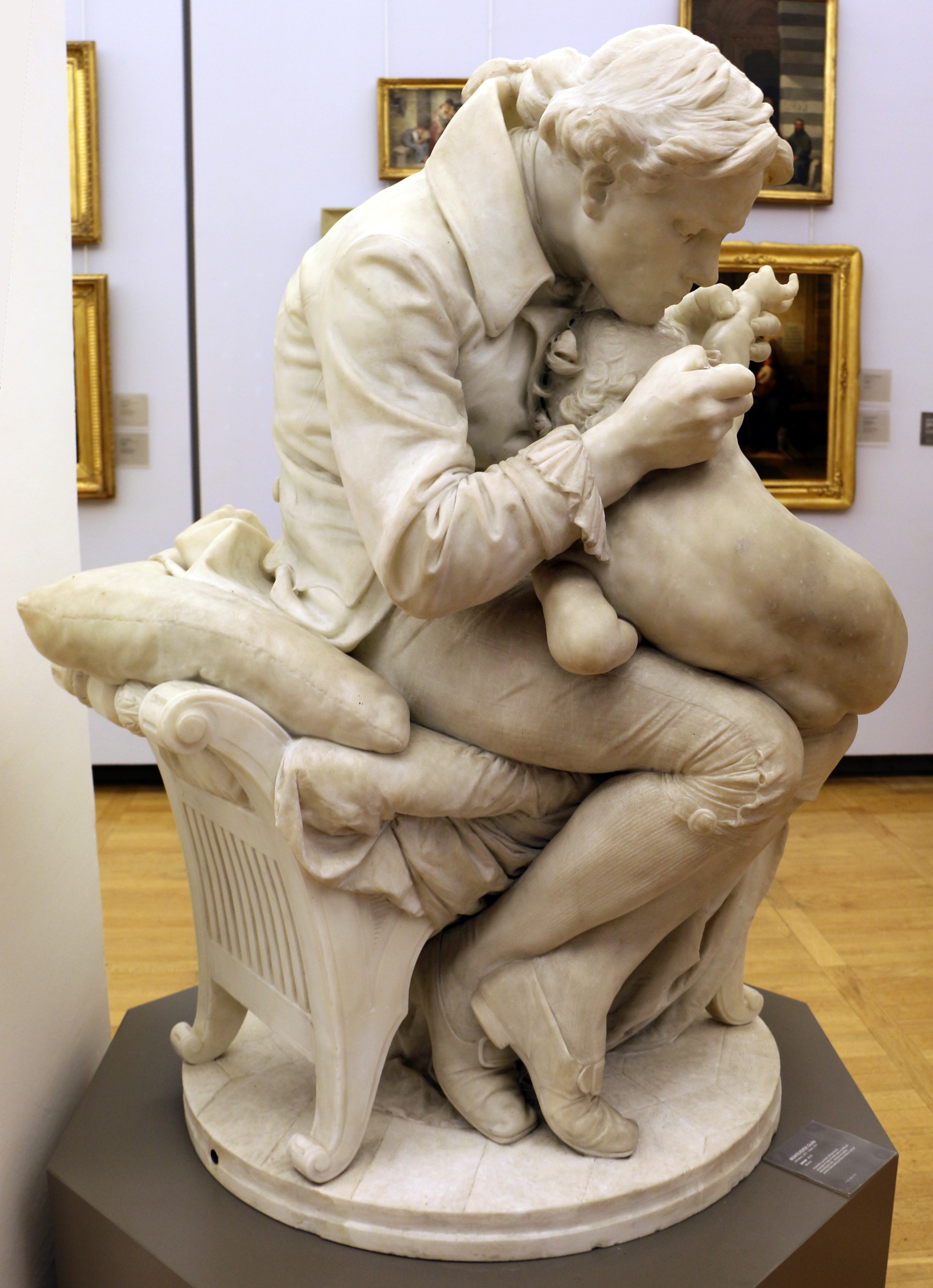
Jenner vaccinating his son against smallpox, sculpture by Giulio Monteverde.

These works placed him among the leading Italian sculptors of the later nineteenth century, associated with naturalism and bourgeois realism. Colombo giovinetto won a gold medal at the first National Exhibition of Fine Arts in Parma in 1870, while Genio di Franklin won a silver medal at the Milan Exhibition in 1872. Jenner vaccinating his son against smallpox, completed in plaster in 1873, won a gold medal at the Vienna Universal Exposition of the same year and brought Monteverde wide critical success.

He later became a professor at the Academy of Fine Arts in Rome. Among his students were Yulia Brazol, Lola Mora and Victor de Pol, who developed significant public work in Buenos Aires.

In 1877, Monteverde made a portrait bust of the Sicilian engraver and painter Francesco Di Bartolo. When he came to Catania in 1882 for the inauguration of his Monument to Vincenzo Bellini in Piazza Stesicoro, Monteverde was hosted by Di Bartolo at his villa in Cibali, Catania.

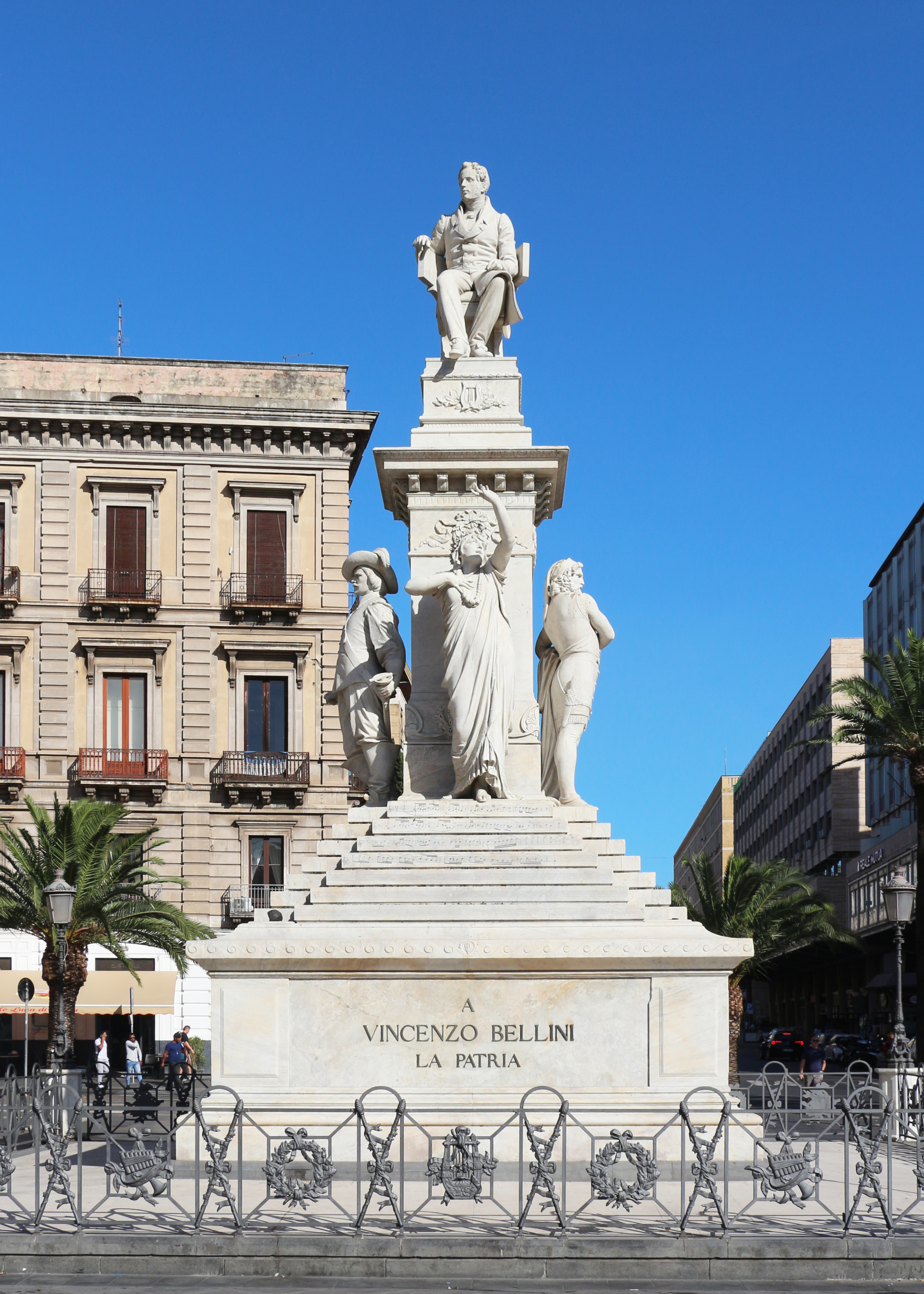
Monument to Vincenzo Bellini, Piazza Stesicoro, Catania.

In 1878 he was made an Officer of the Legion of Honour. In the same year, the marble version of Jenner vaccinating his son against smallpox was exhibited with success at the Paris Universal Exposition, where Monteverde was also present as a juror. He was involved in the Italian artistic presence at the same exposition together with the painter Domenico Morelli and Di Bartolo, under the artistic representation promoted by Minister Salvatore Majorana Calatabiano.

Monteverde also became a public figure, serving on artistic commissions and taking part in official cultural life. On 26 January 1889 he was appointed a senator of the Kingdom of Italy. In his later career he produced major funerary and symbolic works, while retaining the naturalist character for which he was known.

He died in Rome on 3 October 1917.

== Principal works ==
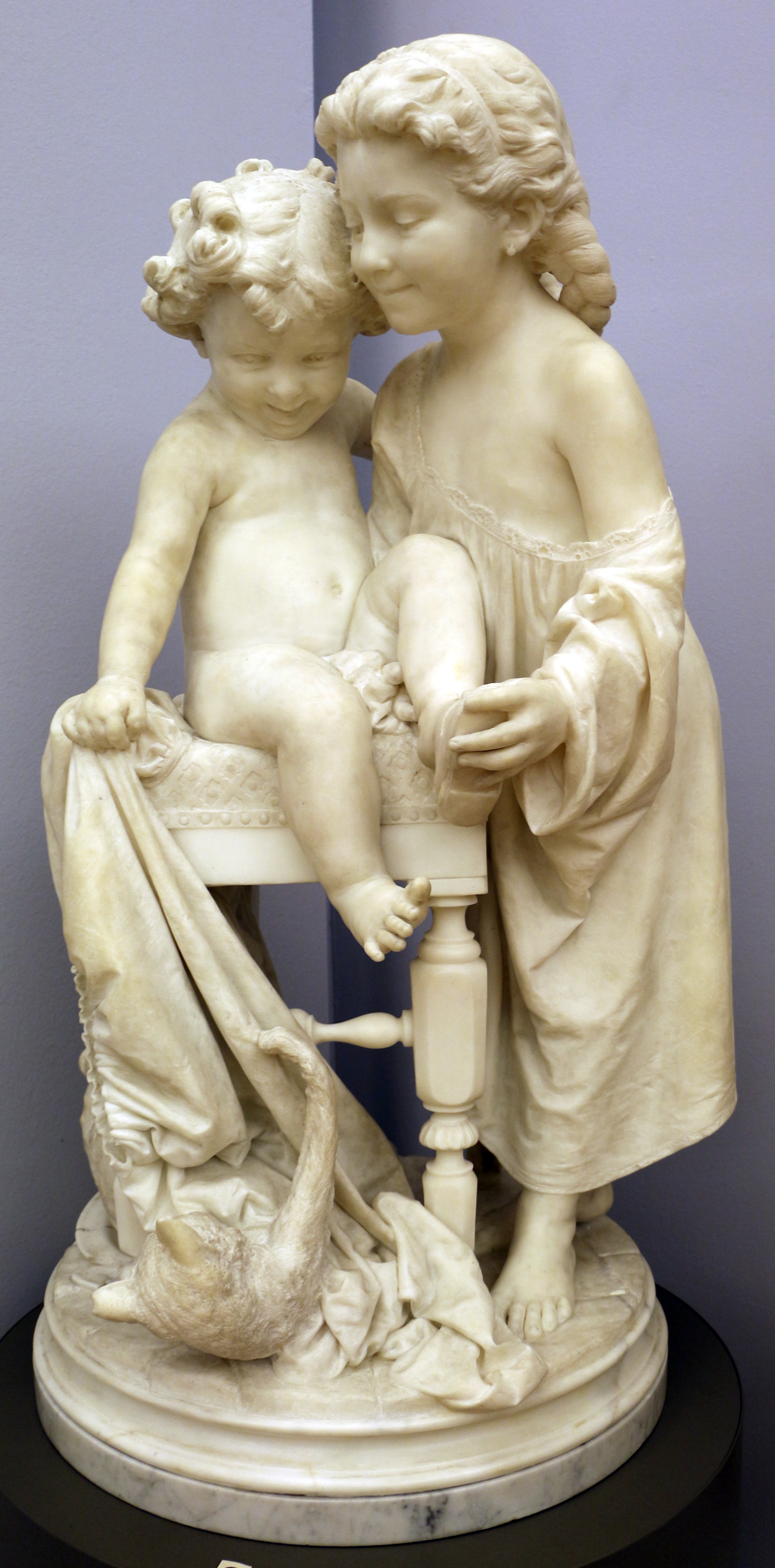
Bambini che giocano con il gatto (Children playing with a cat), 1874

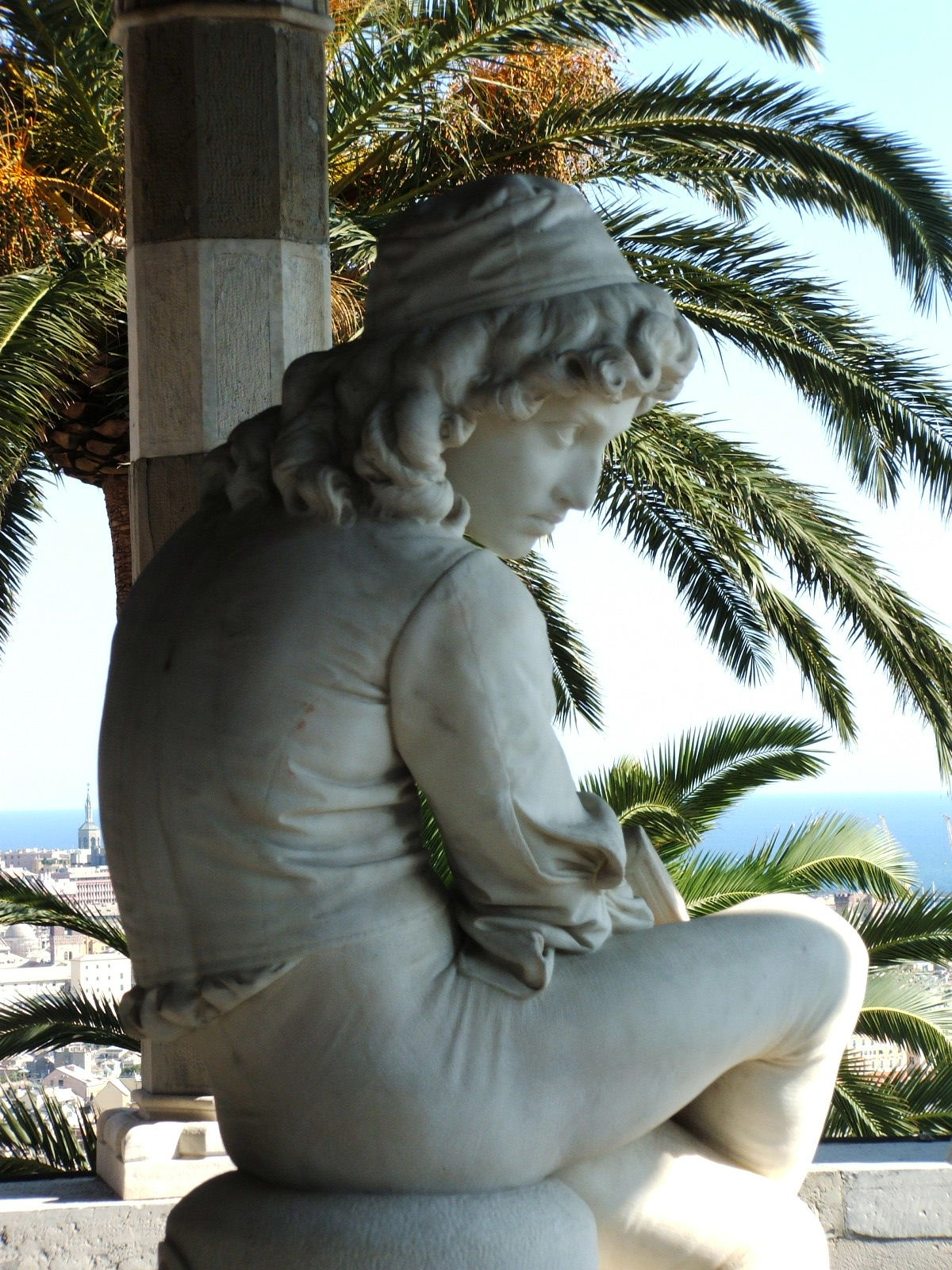
Colombo giovinetto

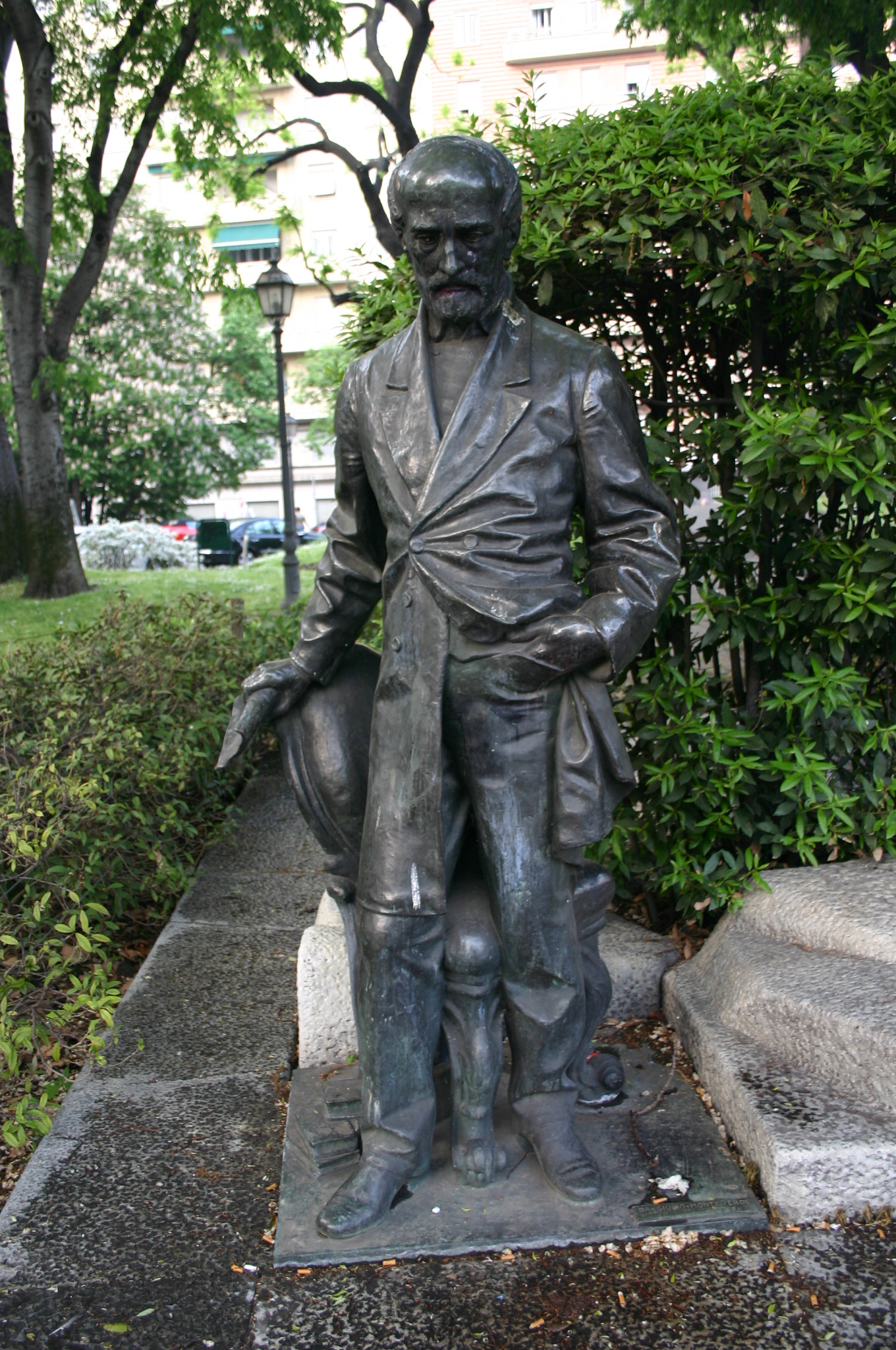
Monument to Giuseppe Mazzini, Milan

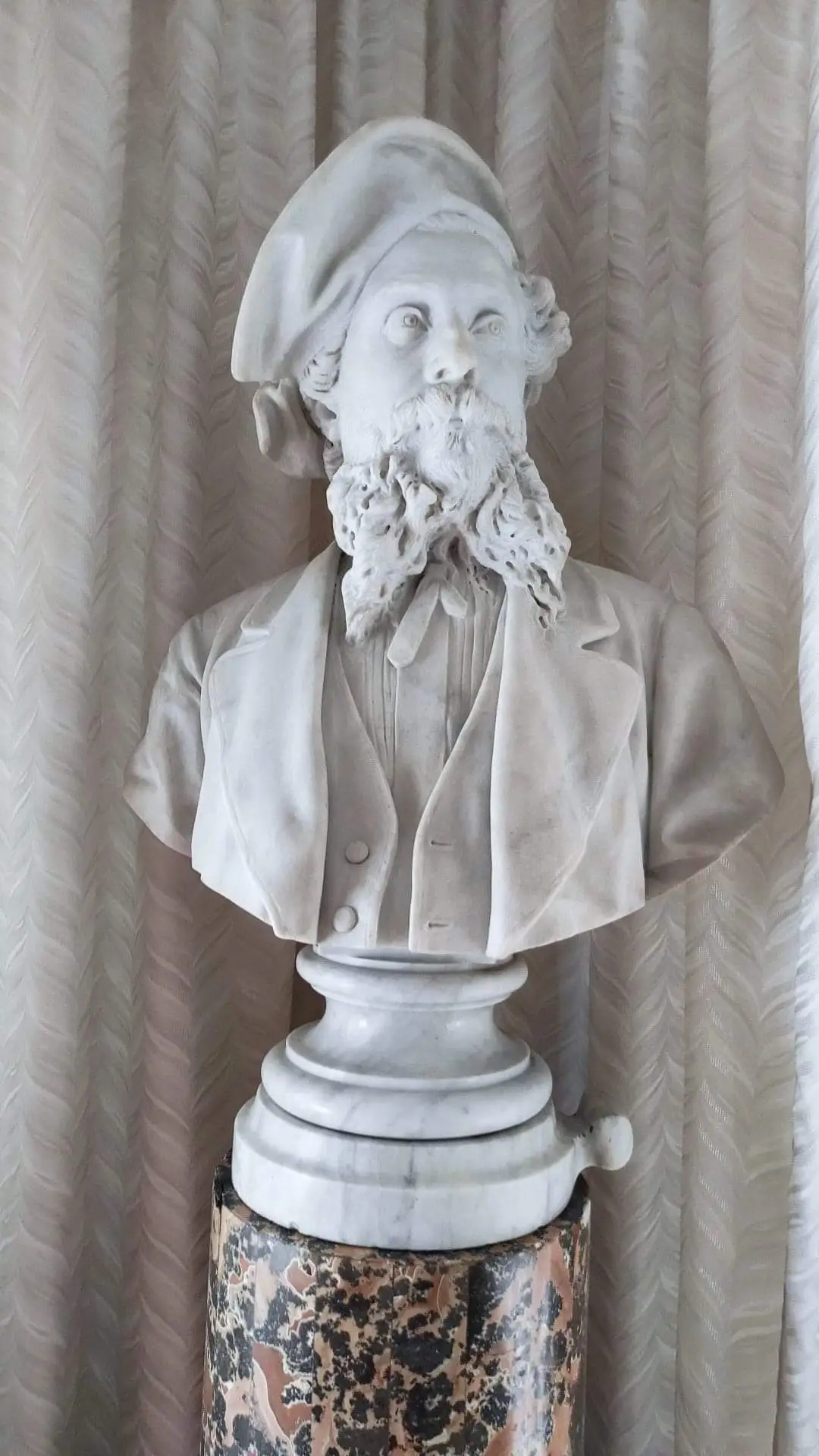
Portrait of Francesco Di Bartolo, 1877

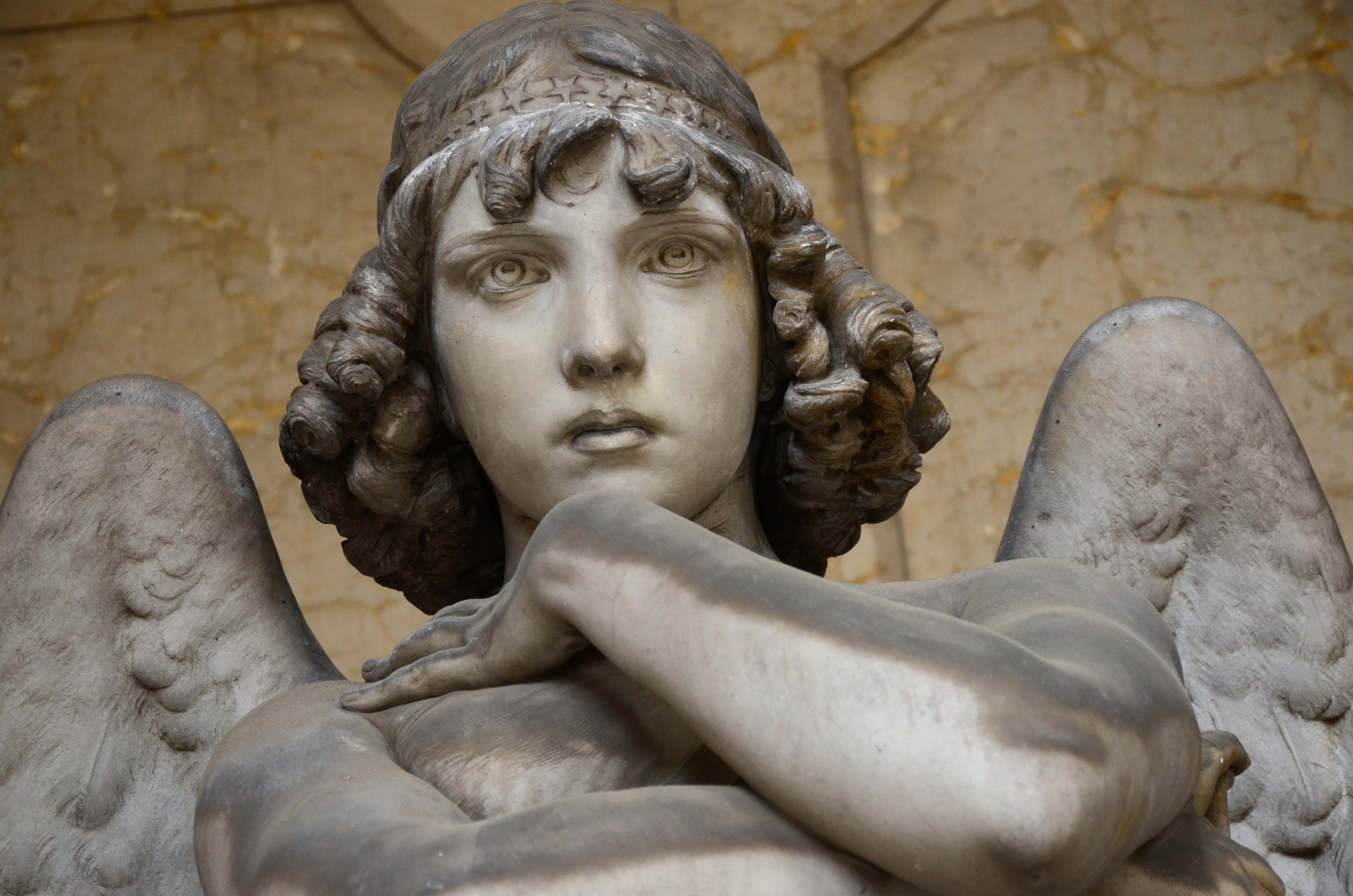
Angelo della Resurrezione, Oneto tomb, Staglieno Cemetery, Genoa

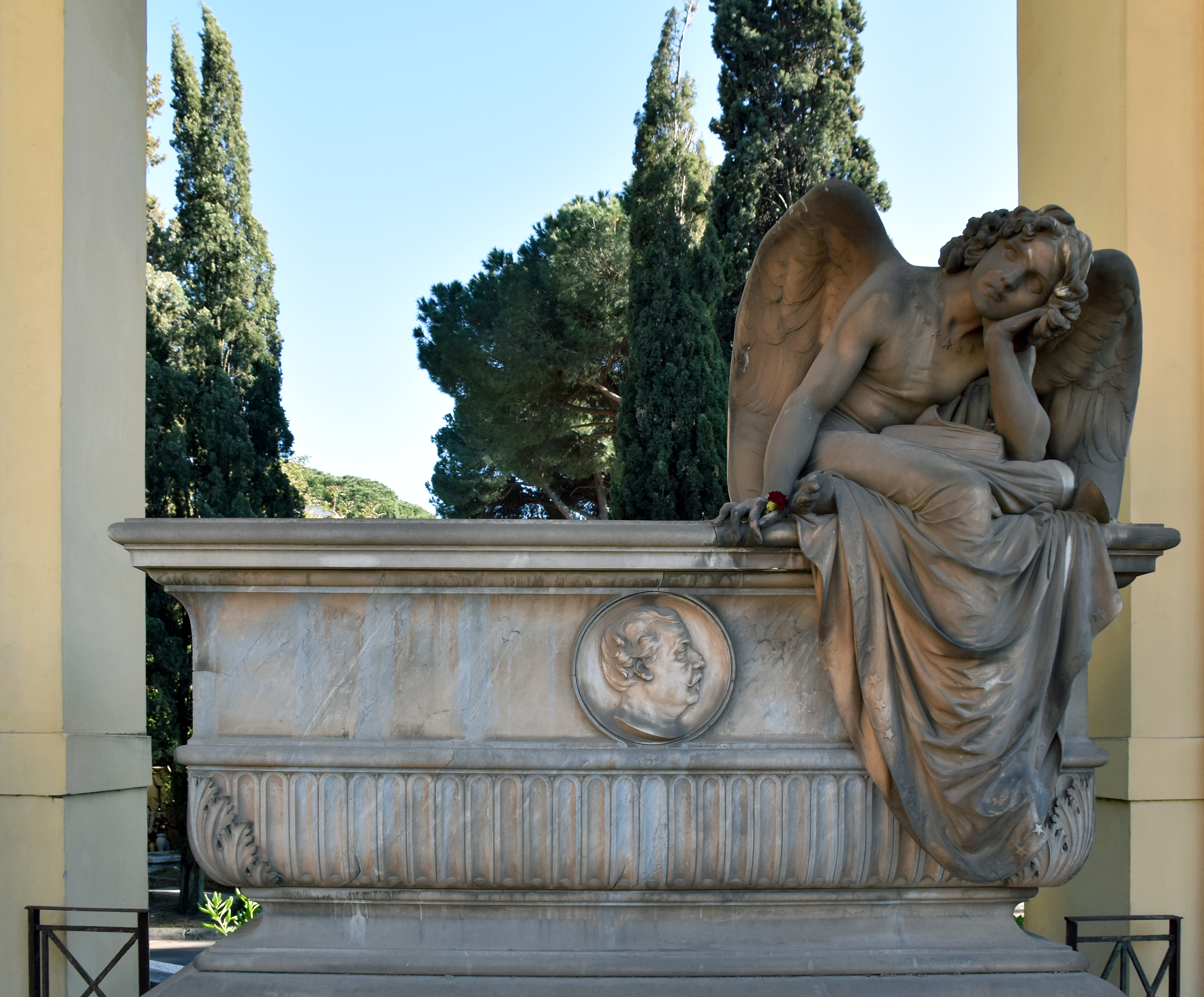
Angel of the Night, Zonca tomb, Verano Cemetery, Rome

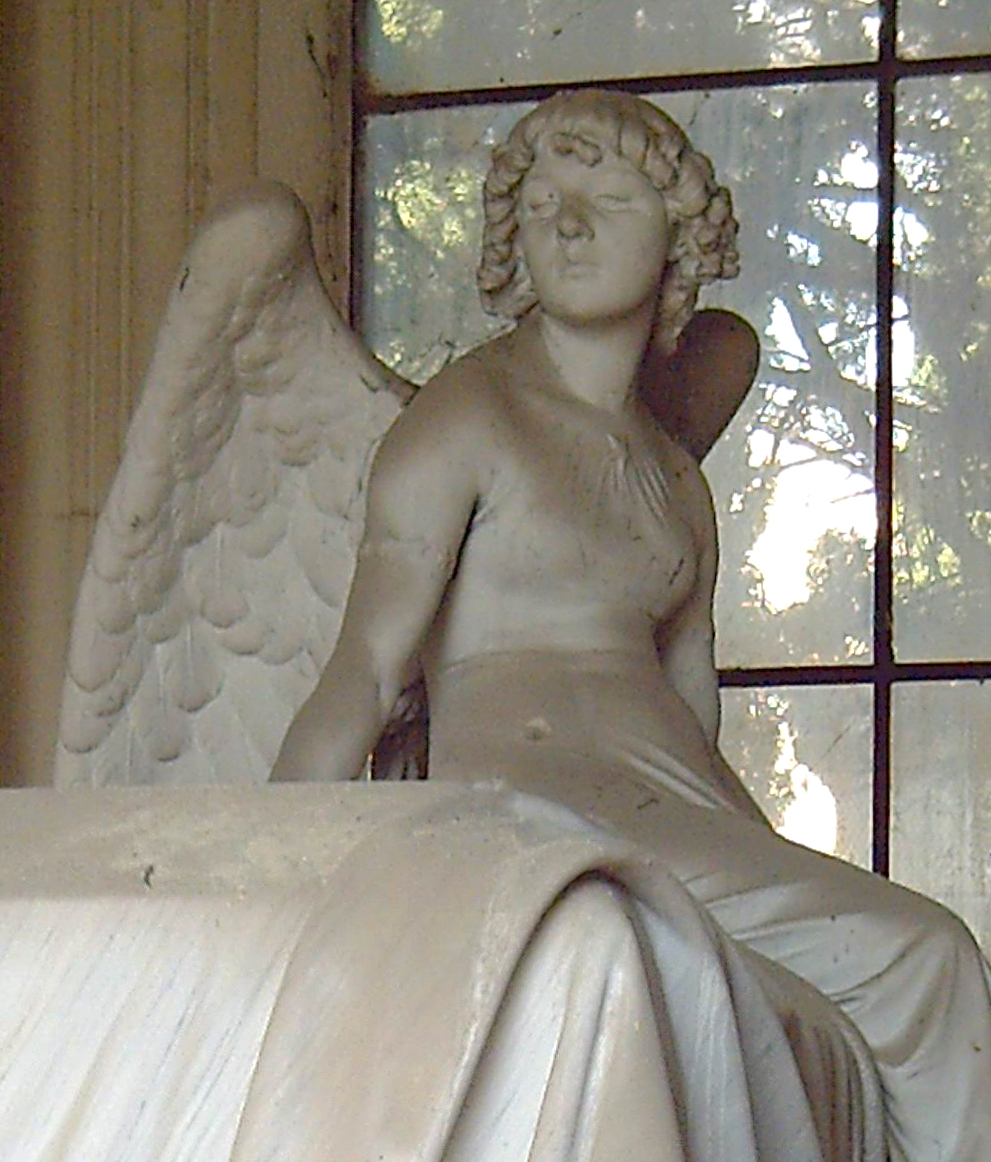
Angel, San Isidro Cemetery, Madrid

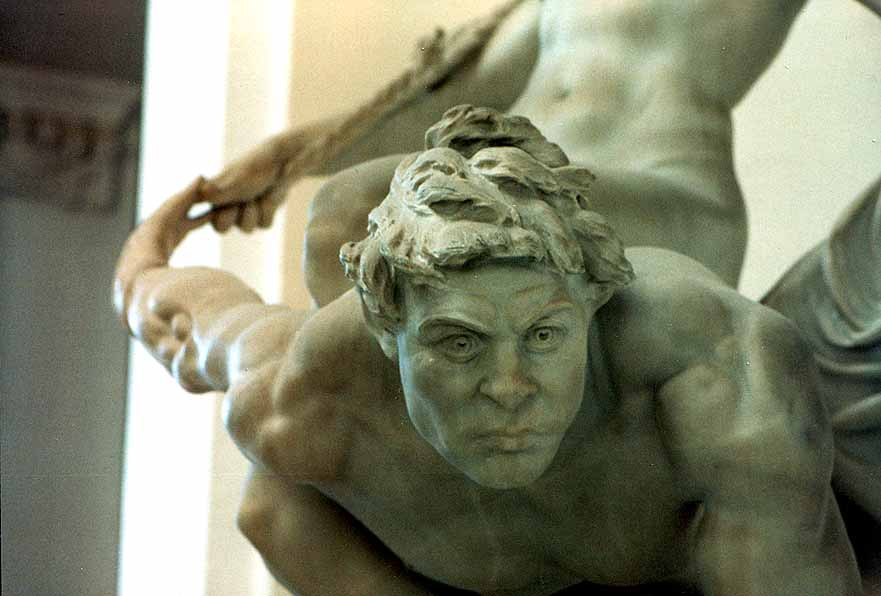
Idealità e materialismo (1911), detail
- Bambini che giocano con il gatto (Children playing with a cat), (1867)
- Pantheon of the Marquess of la Gándara: marble angel, San Isidro Cemetery, Madrid
- Monument to Raffaele Pratolongo, (1868) – Genoa, Monumental Cemetery of Staglieno
- Colombo giovinetto (The boy Columbus) (1870)
- Genio di Franklin (Franklin's genius) (1871)
- Jenner colto nell'atto di inoculare il vaccino del vaiolo al proprio figlio (Jenner vaccinating his own son against smallpox) (1873) – Rome, Galleria Nazionale d'Arte Moderna
- Monument to Giuseppe Mazzini (1879) – Buenos Aires, Argentina
- Cristo morto (Christ dead) (1880) – Buenos Aires, Recoleta Cemetery, Argentina
- Monument to Francesco Oneto (1882) – Genoa, Monumental Cemetery of Staglieno
- Monument to Vincenzo Bellini (1882) – Catania, Piazza Stesicoro
- Portrait bust of Francesco Di Bartolo, 1877 - Rome, marble, Catania Private collection.
- Angelo della Resurrezione (1882) – Genoa, Monumental Cemetery of Staglieno
- Tomba Celle (Cell tomb) (1893) – Genoa, Monumental Cemetery of Staglieno
- Idealità e materialismo (Idealism and materialism) (1911) – Rome, Galleria Nazionale d'Arte Moderna
- Il pensiero (The thought) – Rome, Vittoriano
- Monument to Vittorio Emanuele II – Rovigo

Monteverde’s funerary angels became among his best-known works and were widely reproduced in later cemetery sculpture. The Angelo della Resurrezione or Angel of the Resurrection, made for the Oneto tomb in the Monumental Cemetery of Staglieno in Genoa, is one of his most famous funerary sculptures. Another important example is the Angel of the Night, made for the Zonca tomb in Rome’s Verano Cemetery.

== Sources ==
- Di Bartolo, Natalia. "Francesco Di Bartolo (1826–1913), engraver and painter: corpus of studies and essays for the bicentenary of birth". OperaeOpera (in Italian).
- Giulio Monteverde (in Italian)
