= Vittorio Lavezzari =

Italian sculptor (1864–1938)

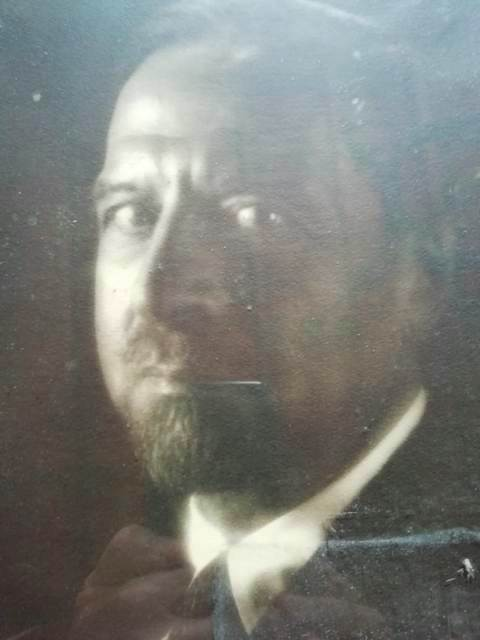
Vittorio Lavezzari

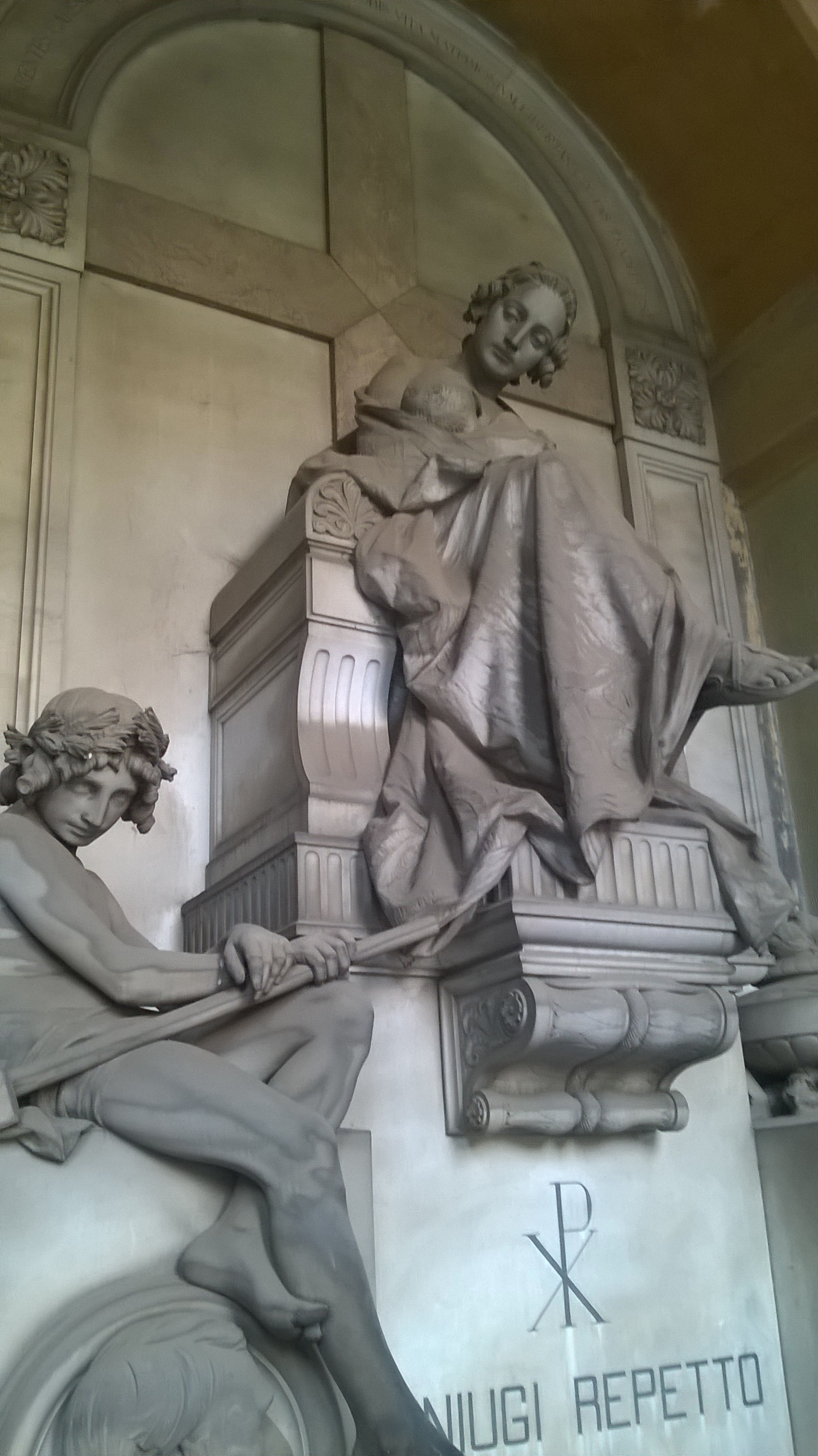
Tomb of the Repetto couple (1897)

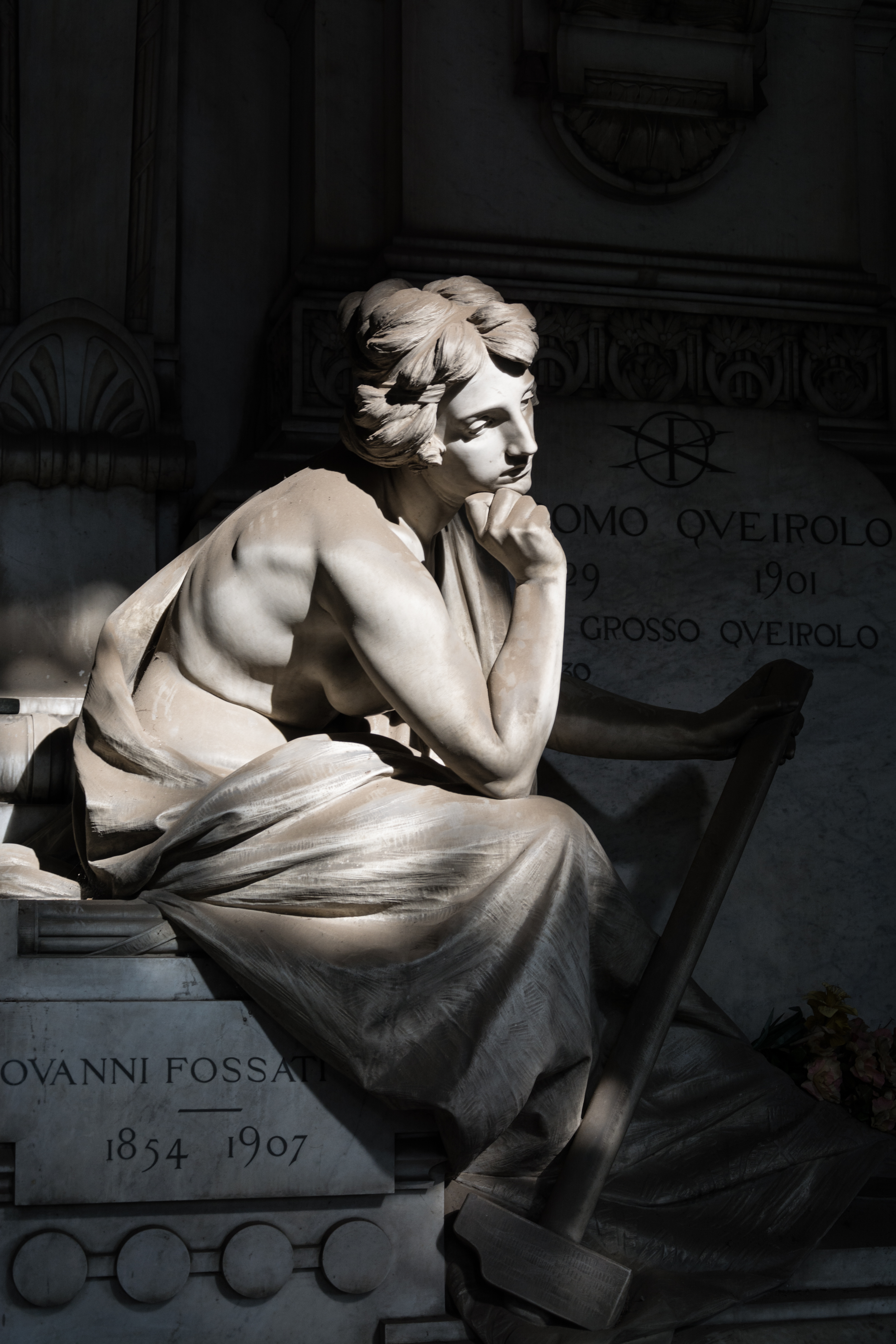
Tomba Giovanni Fossati - Staglieno 1903

Vittorio Lavezzari (1864–1938) was an Italian sculptor from the Art Nouveau period, specializing in funerary sculpture. His sculptures can mostly be seen in Genoa in the Monumental Cemetery of Staglieno.

== Biography ==
Born in Genoa, he attended the Accademia Ligustica di Belle Arti in Genoa, where he was a student of Scanzi (he worked on the Carpaneto tomb), and later became a professor (in 1894 he was appointed academic of merit for the class of sculpture and was there until 1938, the year of his death). He completed his studies in Rome and then in Florence, where he stayed for a few years between 1880 and 1890.

Present at the Promotrice of Genovese since 1883 (exhibiting a portrait of Rossini), he oriented himself in these years in a realist direction with a progressive accentuation of social themes.

Among the works of this period are Povre babbo mio (1889), Pescatorino (1892) reproduced as a prize for the Promoter's competitions: a notable success was also presented at the World's Fair in Chicago in 1893.

At the end of the 1890s, his funeral production was intensified and assumed symbolist-liberty characteristics.

He participated in national and international exhibitions, received important awards, was present at exhibitions in Venice, Vienna, Munich, Paris, London, Chicago. His works are present in Russia, Brazil and Argentina.

He was part of the Genovese Artistic Family and was in a friendly relationship with the painters Andrea Figari, Guido Meineri, Lazzaro Luxardo Cesare Viazzi, Angelo Costa, Giuseppe Pennasilico, and the sculptors Pietro Albino and Lorenzo Orengo, with whom he shared the spirit of renewal that animated the art world between the late nineteenth and early twentieth centuries.

His funeral production was copious; some works are visible at the Monumental Cemetery of Staglieno in Genoa.
