= John Leonard (critic) =

American literary and cultural critic (1939–2008)

- Leonard in 1974
- Born: February 25, 1939; Washington, D.C., U.S.
- Died: November 5, 2008 (aged 69); New York City, U.S.
- Occupations: Critic, writer
- Spouse: Sue Nessel (m. 1976)
- Children: 2, including Andrew
- Writing career
- Pen name: Cyclops

John Dillon Leonard (February 25, 1939 – November 5, 2008) was an American literary, television, film, and cultural critic and essayist.

== Early life and education ==
John Leonard grew up in Washington, D.C., Jackson Heights, Queens, and Long Beach, California, where he graduated from Woodrow Wilson High School. Raised by a single mother, Ruth Smith, he made his way to Harvard University, where he immersed himself in the college newspaper, The Harvard Crimson, only to drop out in the spring of his second year. He then attended the University of California at Berkeley.

== Career ==
Though politically liberal, Leonard had an unlikely early patron in conservative leader William F. Buckley, who gave him his first job in journalism at National Review magazine in 1959. There, he worked alongside other young writers like Joan Didion, Garry Wills, Renata Adler and Arlene Croce.

In the early 1960s, Leonard became the Drama and Literature Director for Pacifica Radio's flagship station, KPFA in Berkeley, California, where he served as the house book reviewer and featured a then-little-known film reviewer named Pauline Kael. He also was the host of a free-form, late-night program called Nightsounds, which inspired the work of Bob Fass at Pacifica sister station WBAI in New York.

Leonard worked as an English teacher in Roxbury, Massachusetts, as a union organizer of migrant farm workers, and as a community organizer during "Vietnam Summer" in 1967, before joining The New York Times Book Review later that same year. In 1968, he signed the "Writers and Editors War Tax Protest" pledge, vowing to refuse tax payments in protest of the Vietnam War.

The Times promoted Leonard to daily book reviewer in 1969, and made him the executive editor of the Times Book Review in 1971 at the age of 31. In 1975, he returned to the role of daily book reviewer, championing the work of women writers such as Fran Lebowitz, Elizabeth Hardwick, Maxine Hong Kingston, Mary Gordon, and his former National Review colleague Renata Adler. He was the first critic to review Nobel Prize-winner Toni Morrison and the first American critic to review Nobel Prize-winner Gabriel García Márquez. Leonard and Morrison became friends, and in 1993 she invited him to accompany her to the Nobel Prize ceremony. From 1977 to 1980, Leonard wrote "Private Lives", a weekly column for the Times about his family, friends, and experiences.

Leonard was a voracious critical omnivore, writing on culture, politics, television, books and the media in many other venues, including The Nation, The New York Review of Books, Harper's Magazine, The Atlantic Monthly, Esquire, Playboy, Penthouse, Vanity Fair, TV Guide, Ms. Magazine, Harper's Bazaar, Vogue, Newsweek, New York Woman, Memories, Tikkun, The Yale Review, The Village Voice, the New Statesman, The Boston Globe, Washington Post Book World, the Los Angeles Times Book Review, American Heritage, and Salon.com. He reviewed books for National Public Radio's Fresh Air and wrote a column for New York Newsday called "Culture Shock." He hosted GBH's First Edition, and reviewed books, TV and movies on CBS Sunday Morning for 16 years. Leonard taught creative writing and criticism at the University of Pennsylvania and Columbia University. He told the story of Japanese author Kōbō Abe in every one of these venues.

Leonard wrote extensively about television in his career – for Life and The New York Times, both under the pen name Cyclops, for New York magazine from 1984 to 2008, and in his 1997 book Smoke and Mirrors. In addition, he authored four novels and five collections of essays.

Leonard was co-literary editor of The Nation with his wife, Sue Leonard, from 1995 to 1998, and continued as a contributing editor for the magazine. He wrote a monthly column on new books for Harper's Magazine and was a frequent contributor to The New York Times Book Review and The New York Review of Books. Leonard rated highest among literary critics in a 2006 Time Out New York survey of writers and publishers. He received the National Book Critics Circle's Ivan Sandrof Lifetime Achievement Award in 2006.

== Personal life and death ==
Leonard died on November 5, 2008, of lung cancer, aged 69. He was survived by his mother, Ruth, wife Sue, two children from his first marriage – Salon.com columnist Andrew Leonard and Georgetown University history professor Amy Leonard – and a stepdaughter, Jen Nessel, who heads the communications department at the Center for Constitutional Rights, as well as three grandchildren: Tiana and Eli Miller-Leonard and Oscar Ray Arnold-Nessel.

== Reception ==
The Columbia Journalism Review called Leonard "our primary progressive, catholic [small "c"] literary critic." Stylistically, he was, as CJR dubbed him, an "enthusiast," known for his wit and wordplay, his liberal use of the semicolon and his impassioned examinations of authors and their works. He wrote career essays on the work of writers ranging from Thomas Pynchon and Joan Didion to Eduardo Galeano, Salman Rushdie, Don DeLillo, Mary Gordon, John Cheever, Toni Morrison, and Richard Powers.

Kurt Vonnegut wrote of him: "When I read anything by my longtime friend John Leonard, his voice is that of a total stranger. He is too polite in ordinary conversations, with me at least, to set off the fireworks of all he knows and feels after reading and comparing and responding to, in the course of his long career as a literary critic, a thousand times more books than I have even heard of. Only in print does he light the night sky of my ignorance and intellectual lassitude with sizzles and bangs, and gorgeous blooms of fire. He is a TEACHER! When I start to read John Leonard, it is as though I, while simply looking for the men's room, blundered into a lecture by the smartest man who ever lived."

Studs Terkel called him "a critic from whom I learned about my own books". Terkel told the NBCC's Elizabeth Taylor: "He speaks truth to power with a style that is all his own – Leonardian. He is a throwback to a great tradition. He has been a literary critic in the noblest sense of the word, where you didn't determine whether a book was 'good or bad' but wrote with a point of view of how you should read the book."

== Legacy ==
In 2013, the National Book Critics Circle created a "First Book" award in his honor, the John Leonard Prize, presented as part of the NBCC Awards.

== Selected works ==
Books

External videos
- Booknotes interview with Leonard on Lonesome Rangers: Homeless Minds, Promised Lands, Fugitive Cultures, June 30, 2002, C-SPAN

- The Naked Martini, Delacorte Press, 1964
- Wyke Regis, Delacorte Press, 1966
- Crybaby of the Western World, Doubleday, 1969 ISBN 0356024571
- Black Conceit, Doubleday, 1973, ISBN 0385067763
- This Pen for Hire, Doubleday Publishing, 1973, ISBN 0385039239
- Private Lives in the Imperial City, Knopf, 1979, ISBN 0394501705
- The Last Innocent White Man in America, New Press, 1993, ISBN 1565840720
- Smoke and Mirrors: Violence, Television, and Other American Cultures, New Press, 1998, ISBN 156584226X
- When the Kissing Had to Stop: Cult Studs, Khmer Newts, Langley Spooks, Techno-Geeks, Video Drones, Author Gods, Serial Killers, Vampire Media, Alien Sperm Suckers, Satanic Therapists and Those of Us Who Hold a Left-Wing Grudge in the Post-Toasties New World Hip-Hop, New Press, 1999, ISBN 1565845331
- Lonesome Rangers: Homeless Minds, Promised Lands, Fugitive Cultures, New Press, 2002, ISBN 156584694X
- Reading for My Life: Writings, 1958-2008. Penguin Group. 2012. ISBN 978-1101561003.

Essays and book introductions

- "Why I'll Never Finish My Mystery", Murder, Ink (1977)
- Friends and Friends of Friends, by Bernard Pierre Wolff (1978)
- "Dodgerisimus", The Ultimate Baseball Book, by Daniel Okrent and Harris Lewine (1979)
- Man's Fate by André Malraux (1984)
- SoHo: A Picture Portrait (1985)
- "Ten (or Twenty) of the Best Books of the Millennium", The Millennium Book by Gail Collins and Dan Collins (1991)
- A Really Big Show: A Visual History of The Ed Sullivan Show (1992)
- "Educating Television", Imagining Education: The Media and Schools in America, by Gene I. Maeroff (1988)
- "Follow the Bouncing Ball: How the Caged Bird Learns to Sing", The Business of Journalism, by William Serrin (2000)
- These United States (introduction and editor, 2003)
- The New York Times Guide to Essential Knowledge: A Desk Reference for the Curious Mind (2004)
- We Tell Ourselves Stories in Order to Live: Collected Nonfiction, by Joan Didion (introduction, 2006)
