= Bernard Pierre Wolff =

French-American photographer

Bernard Pierre Wolff (1930 – 28 January 1985) was a French-born American photographer. In the 1950s and 1960s he worked as an art director, and from the 1970s worked as a photographer travelling and taking photographs of people. He made street photographs in New York City in the 1970s. His photographs of monumental sculpture were used as cover artwork for music by Joy Division in 1980. All of his work is held by the Maison européenne de la photographie in Paris, which exhibited it in 2017.

== Life and work ==
From 1955 to 1958 Wolff worked at the Cinémathèque Française in Paris as assistant to its director, Henri Langlois. He moved to New York City in the late 1950s and worked as art director at the Foreign Policy Association for 18 years. From 1974, for more than four years, he made street photographs in New York City. From the mid 1970s he worked as a professional photographer for various United Nations organisations, travelling and photographing people.

Designers Peter Saville and Martyn Atkins used Wolff's 1978 photographs of monumental sculpture in the Monumental Cemetery of Staglieno in Genoa, Italy as cover artwork for music releases by Joy Division in 1980. His photograph of the Appiani family tomb was used for the album Closer and his photograph of the Ribaudo family tomb was used on the 12" version of the single "Love Will Tear Us Apart".

== Death and legacy ==
Wolff died as a result of AIDS, age 54, on 28 January 1985.

All of his work now belongs to the Maison européenne de la photographie in Paris.

== Publications ==
- Friends and Friends of Friends. New York: E. P. Dutton, 1978. ISBN 978-0525475194. With an introduction by John Leonard.
- En Inde = in India. Paris: Chêne/Hachette, 1982. ISBN 9782851083005.
- New York: Macadam. Paris: Chêne/Hachette, 1983. ISBN 978-2851083319. With an essay by Jean-François Chaix.
- Bernard Pierre Wolff. Paris: Paris audiovisuel, 1986. ISBN 978-2904732096. Catalogue of an exhibition at Espace photographique de la Ville de Paris, Paris, and at Musée de l'Élysée, Lausanne.
- Bernard Pierre Wolff – Itinérances (1971–1984). Maison européenne de la photographie / A à Z., 2017. Catalogue of an exhibition at Maison européenne de la photographie.

== Exhibitions ==
- Midtown Y Photography Gallery, New York City, 1976
- Bernard Pierre Wolff – Photographies, 1971–1984, Maison européenne de la photographie, Paris, 2017. Curated by Jean-Luc Monterosso.
