= Antonio Allegretti =

Italian sculptor

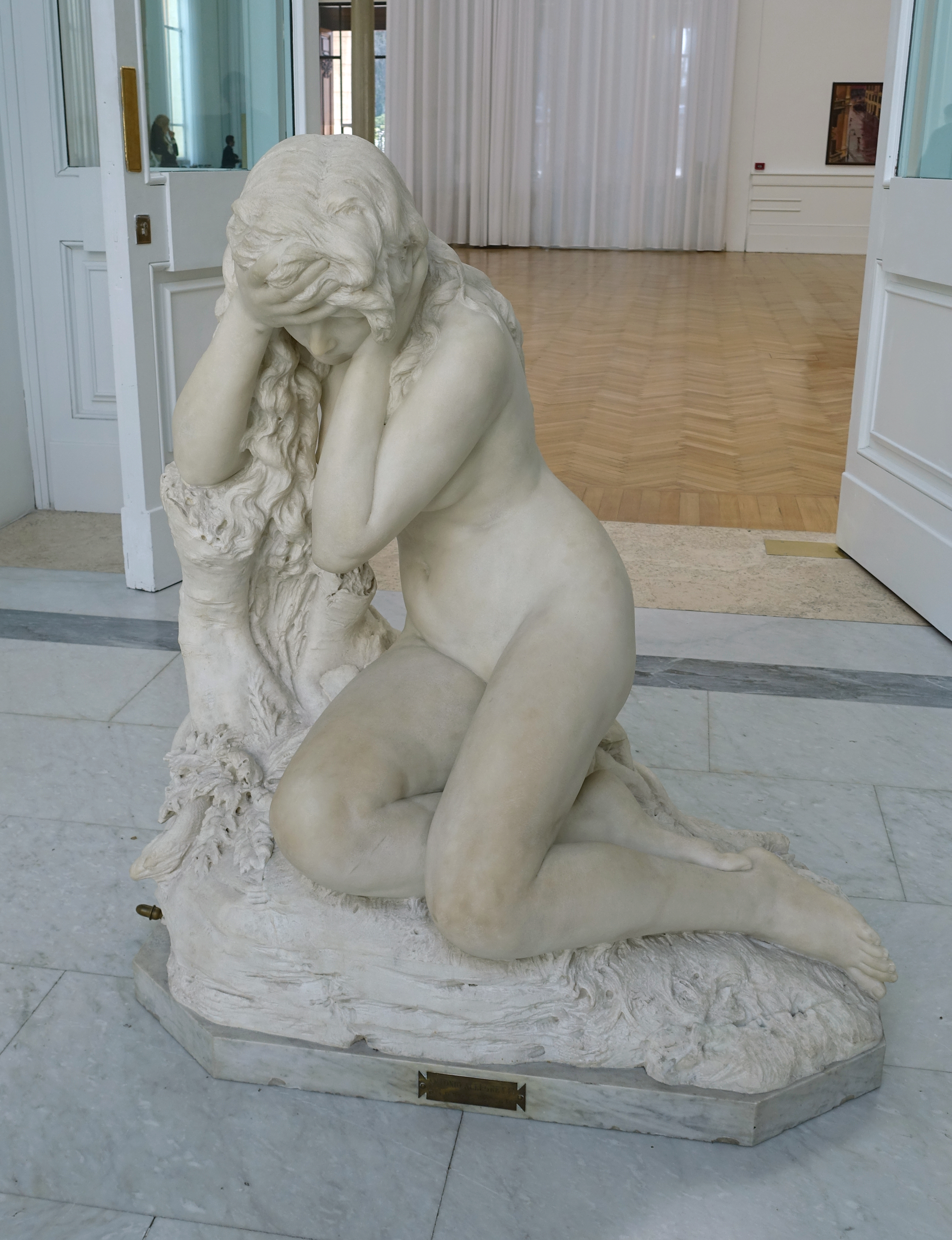
Eve After Sin, 1881

Antonio Allegretti (1840–1918) was an Italian sculptor. He was born in Cuneo, Piedmont, and died in Carrara, Italy. He trained in Genoa under Santo Varni. His submission to a contest in Genoa of the statue of Cain, awarded him a stipend and a Gold medal from the Accademia Linguistica, and he moved to Florence. There he made a portrait of Marchese Ginno Capponi. From there he moved to Rome, where he became professor of sculpture at the Royal Institute of Fine Arts in Rome.

In Rome he completed a statue of Margherita del Fausto, exhibited at the International Exposition of Paris, where it was lauded, reproduced, and sold. His Eve after the Sin was purchased by Rome municipality, and is exhibited in the Galleria nazionale d'arte moderna.
