= Monumental Cemetery of Staglieno =

Cemetery in Genoa, Italy

Cimitero monumentale di Staglieno
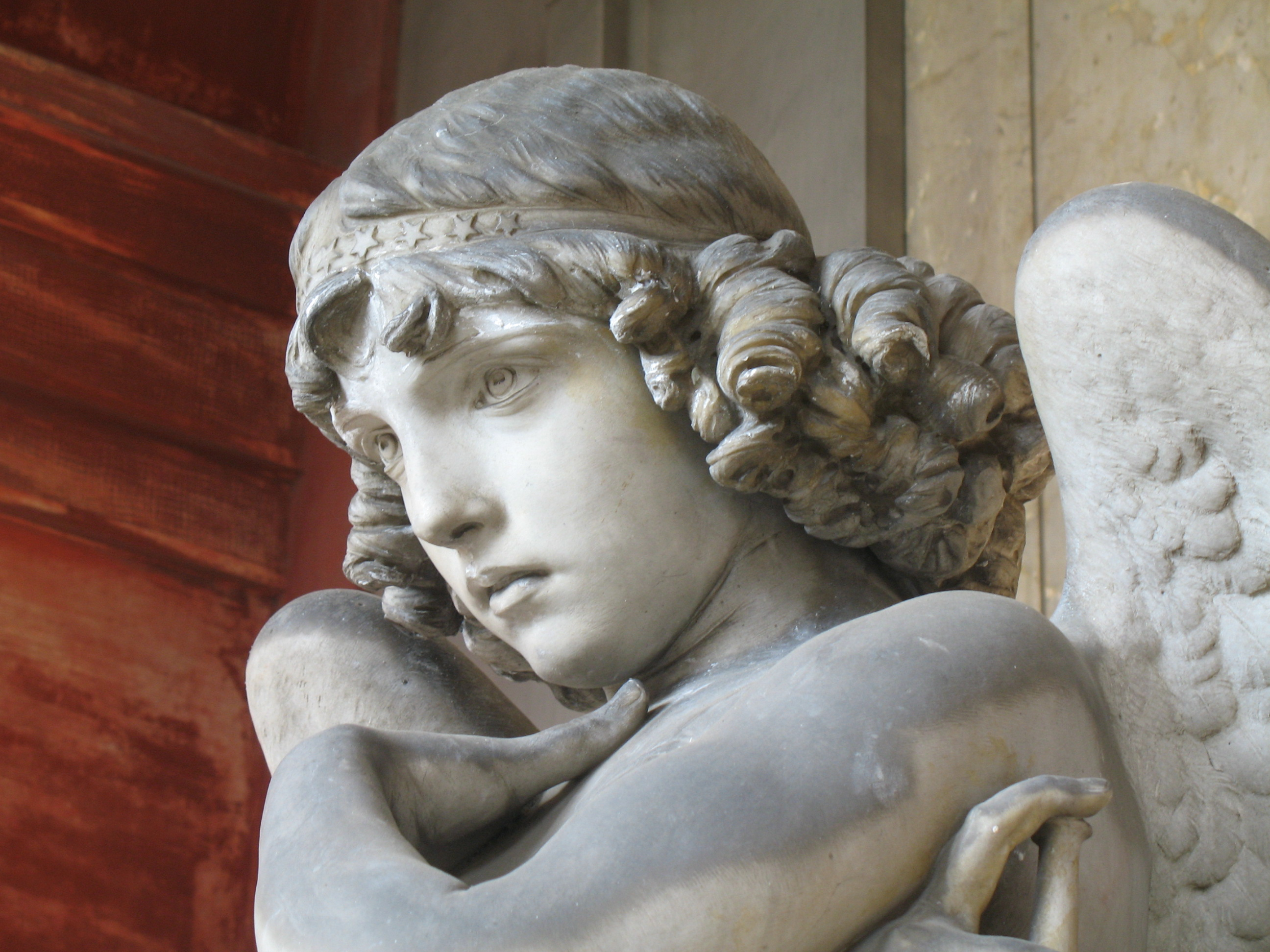
- The Oneto family monument, an angel by sculptor Giulio Monteverde
- Interactive map of Cimitero monumentale di Staglieno

Details
- Established: 1851
- Location: Genoa
- Country: Italy
- Coordinates: 44°25′49″N 8°57′01″E
- Type: Public
- Size: 1 square kilometre (250 acres)
- No. of graves: 115,000+

The Cimitero monumentale di Staglieno is an extensive monumental cemetery located on a hillside in the district of Staglieno of Genoa, Italy, famous for its monumental sculpture. Covering an area of more than a square kilometre, it is one of the largest cemeteries in Europe.

== History ==
The design of the cemetery of the City of Genoa dates back to Napoleon's Edict of Saint-Cloud from 1804, when he forbade burials in churches and towns.

The original project was approved in 1835 by the city's architect Carlo Barabino (1768–1835). However, he died the same year as a result of the cholera epidemic that struck the city and the project passed to his assistant and pupil Giovanni Battista Resasco (1798–1871).

Part of the south-eastern hillside of Staglieno was acquired for the cemetery. The site of the Villa Vaccarezza was chosen as the most suitable, being both sparsely populated and close to the centre of the city. Work began in 1844 and it was opened on 2 January 1851. On that day there were four burials.

Over time there were several extensions and the cemetery now includes sections for an English cemetery, a Protestant one and a Jewish one. At the centre of the site is a tall statue of Faith, sculpted by Santo Varni. Facing the statue, up a grand staircase, is a domed Pantheon (a copy of the Pantheon in Rome) with a Doric portico flanked by two marble statues of the prophets Jeremiah and Job.

At the time Genoa was a major centre of learning within Italy and attracted reformists and an affluent bourgeoisie. Wishing to place long-lasting memorials to remember their work and moral accomplishments, they developed a tradition of funereal sculpture, particularly realistic works, to be placed with their tombs.

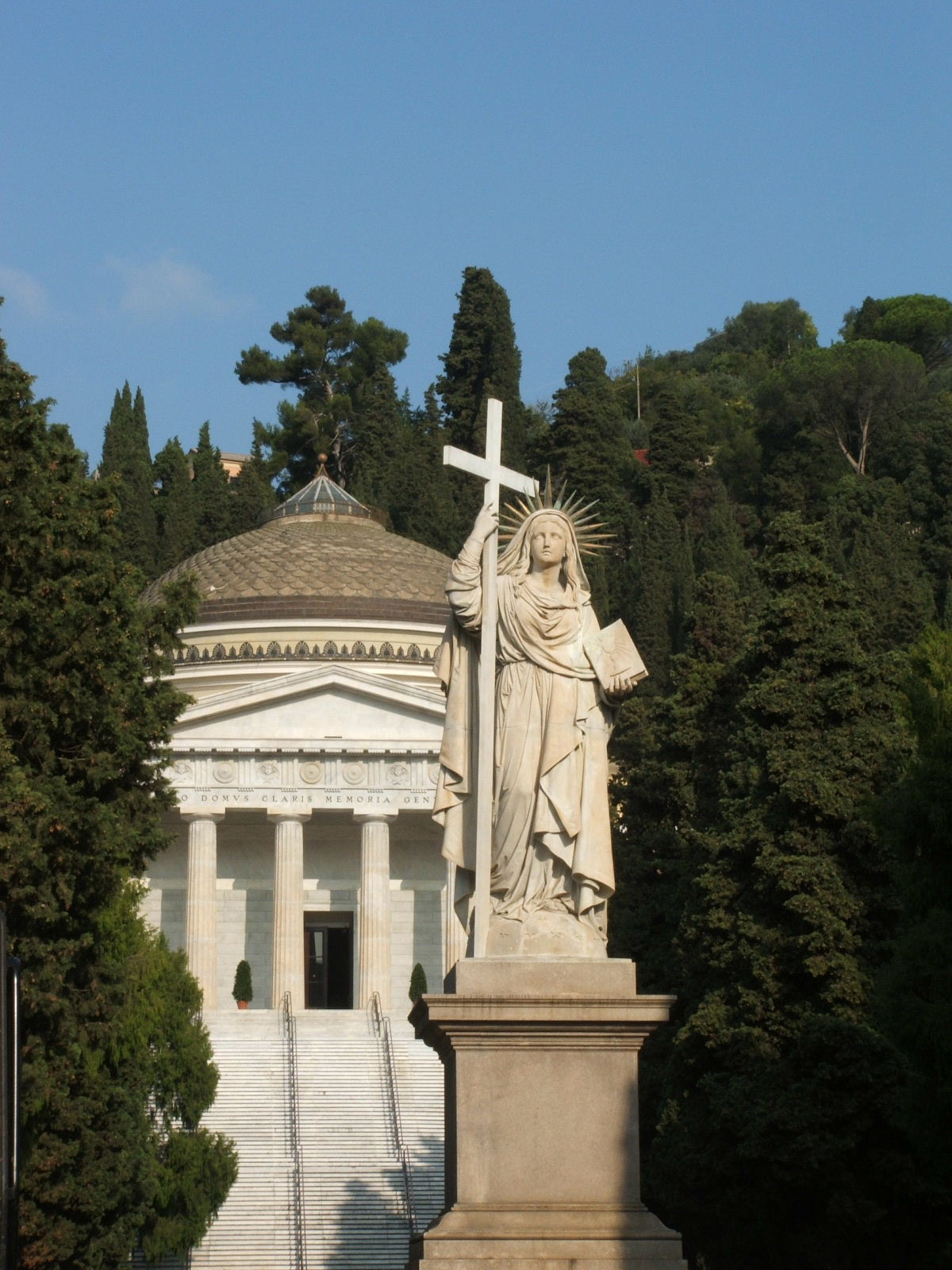
The 9m high statue of Faith with the Pantheon behind

== Memorials ==
The cemetery includes the graves of:

- Nino Bixio (1821–1873), general, patriot and politician
- Fabrizio De André (1940–1999), singer-songwriter
- Leah L'Estrange Malone (1886–1951), British politician
- Constance Lloyd (1858–1898), wife of Oscar Wilde
- Giuseppe Mazzini (1805–1872), politician, journalist and activist
- Michele Novaro (1818–1885), composer
- Anna Maria Ortese (1914–1998), novelist
- Fernanda Pivano (1917–2009), writer, translator and journalist
- Ferruccio Parri (1890–1981), prime minister of Italy
- Edoardo Sanguineti (1930–2010), poet

Significant sculptors with work there include Leonardo Bistolfi, Augusto Rivalta, Giulio Monteverde, Eugenio Baroni, Edoardo Alfieri and Vittorio Lavezzari.

The strong British influence in the city of Genoa in the late 19th century is reflected in the separate British Cemetery at Staglieno which contains the graves of British and Commonwealth servicemen from both the First and Second World Wars. There are 230 from the First, (during which period there were 3 British military hospitals in the area) and 122 from the Second. The latter, buried in a plot designed by architect Louis de Soissons, were mainly garrison burials or reburials concentrated from other cemeteries.

== Cultural references ==
Mark Twain briefly praises the cemetery in his 1869 book Innocents Abroad, and Friedrich Nietzsche visited the cemetery frequently in the 1880s with his friend Paul Ree and had many long philosophical discussions as they strolled through the funereal colonnades.

Photographs of two tombs in the cemetery are featured on the covers of records by the English band Joy Division. The Appiani family tomb, sculpted by Demetrio Paernio c. 1910, was used on the cover of the album Closer. A grieving angel on the Ribaudo family tomb, sculpted by Onorato Toso also c. 1910, was used as an alternate cover for the 12" version of the single "Love Will Tear Us Apart". Both photographs were taken by Bernard Pierre Wolff in 1978.

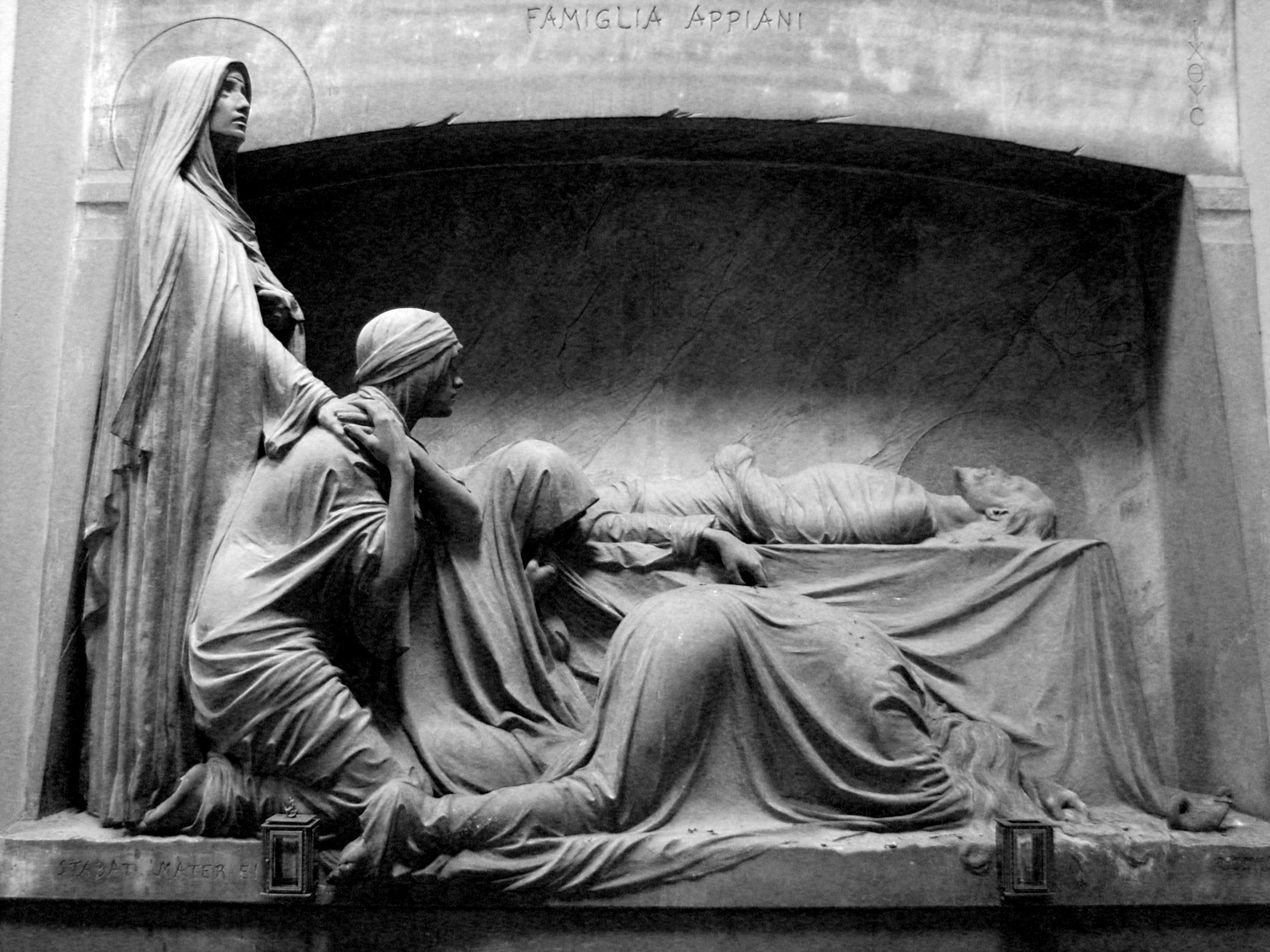
The Appiani tomb

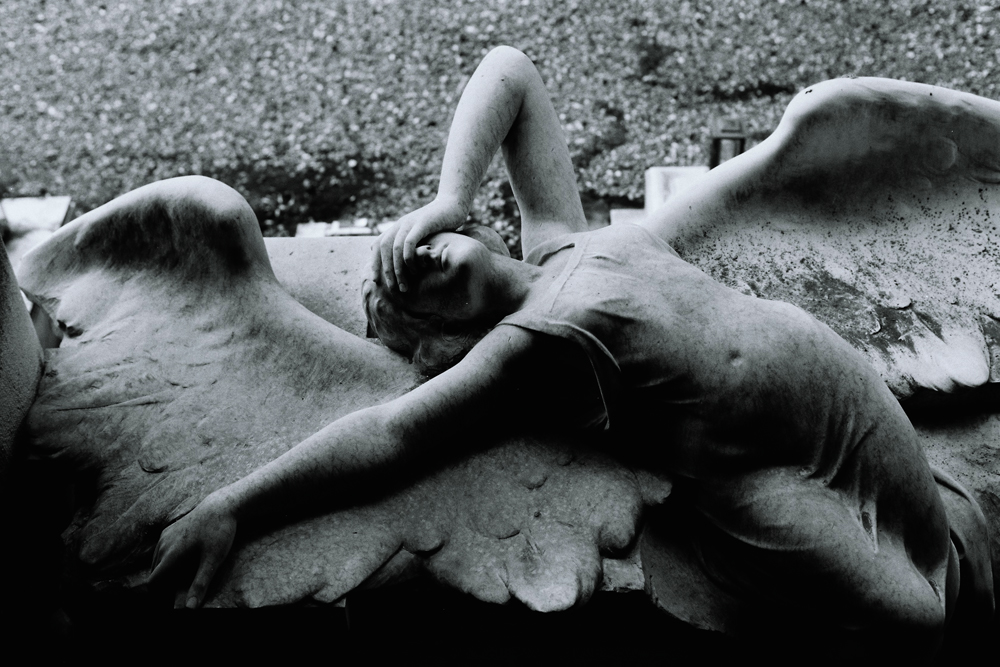
The Ribaudo tomb

Staglieno was the subject of a 2003 book of photographs by Lee Friedlander. In that same year, a smaller selection of Friedlander's Staglieno photographs were published by the LeRoy Neiman Center for Print Studies, Columbia University, in a limited edition set of photogravures. The portfolio case of the project was bound in red coffin velvet to enhance the memorial effect of the project.

According to The Making of On Her Majesty's Secret Service by Charles Helfenstein, the original opening for On Her Majesty's Secret Service in early scripts was supposed to have taken place at the Staglieno Cemetery. The plot involved Blofeld faking his own death and Bond visiting the Blofeld crypt at the Staglieno Cemetery to ensure he is dead.

== See also ==
- Certosa di Bologna, the site of the city's monumental cemetery
- Cimitero Monumentale di Milano
- Monteverde Angel – one of the most famous sculptures in the cemetery
- Monumental Cemetery of Bonaria in Sardinia
- Ugo Foscolo
