= Monteverde Angel =

Sculpture by Giulio Monteverde

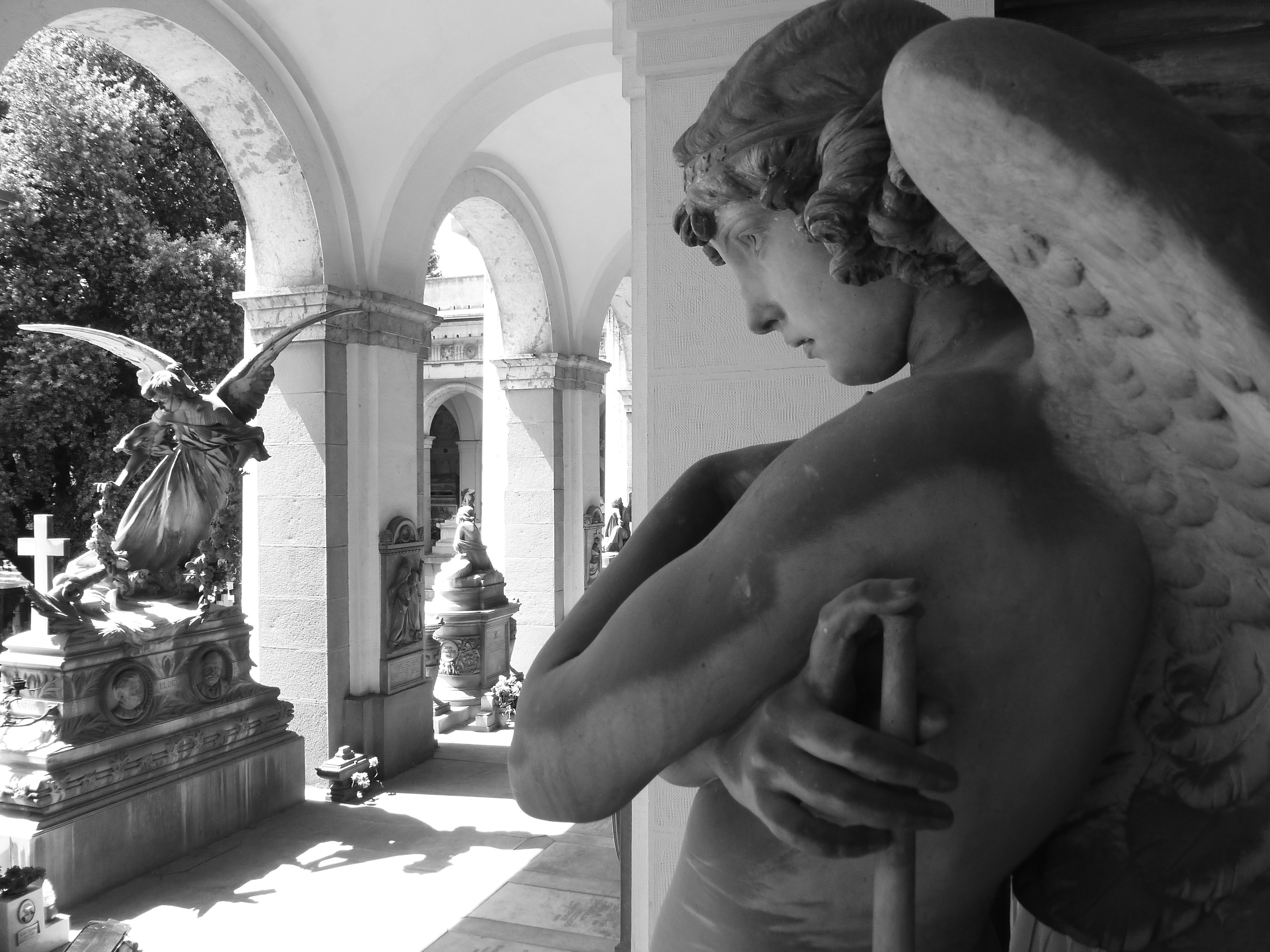
Giulio Monteverde, Oneto Tomb, Monumental Cemetery of Staglieno, Genoa

The Monteverde Angel or Angel of the Resurrection (Italian Angelo di Monteverde and Angelo della Resurrezione) is a masterpiece of neo-classical religious sculpture, created in marble in 1882 by the Italian artist Giulio Monteverde.

The statue of 1882 guards the tomb of the Oneto family in the cemetery of Staglieno in Genoa, Northern Italy. It is one of the most famous works by the neo-classical Italian sculptor Giulio Monteverde (1837-1917) and was commissioned by Francesco Oneto, a president of the Banca Generale, in honour of deceased members of his family.

Portraying a pensive angel with long, richly detailed wings, it is acknowledged as one of the most beautiful and sensual sculptures in its genre, to which Monteverde contributed other important neo-classical works.

A picture of the work graces the cover of several editions of the publication, Camposanto Di Genova. The booklet calls the work, "a true masterpiece" and states, "The Angel, who guards the urn, is admired for the perfect moulding of the arms, neck and head, the deep and soft expression of grief"; the Angel is holding a trumpet, "as if ready to sound it on the last judgement day."

== Gallery ==
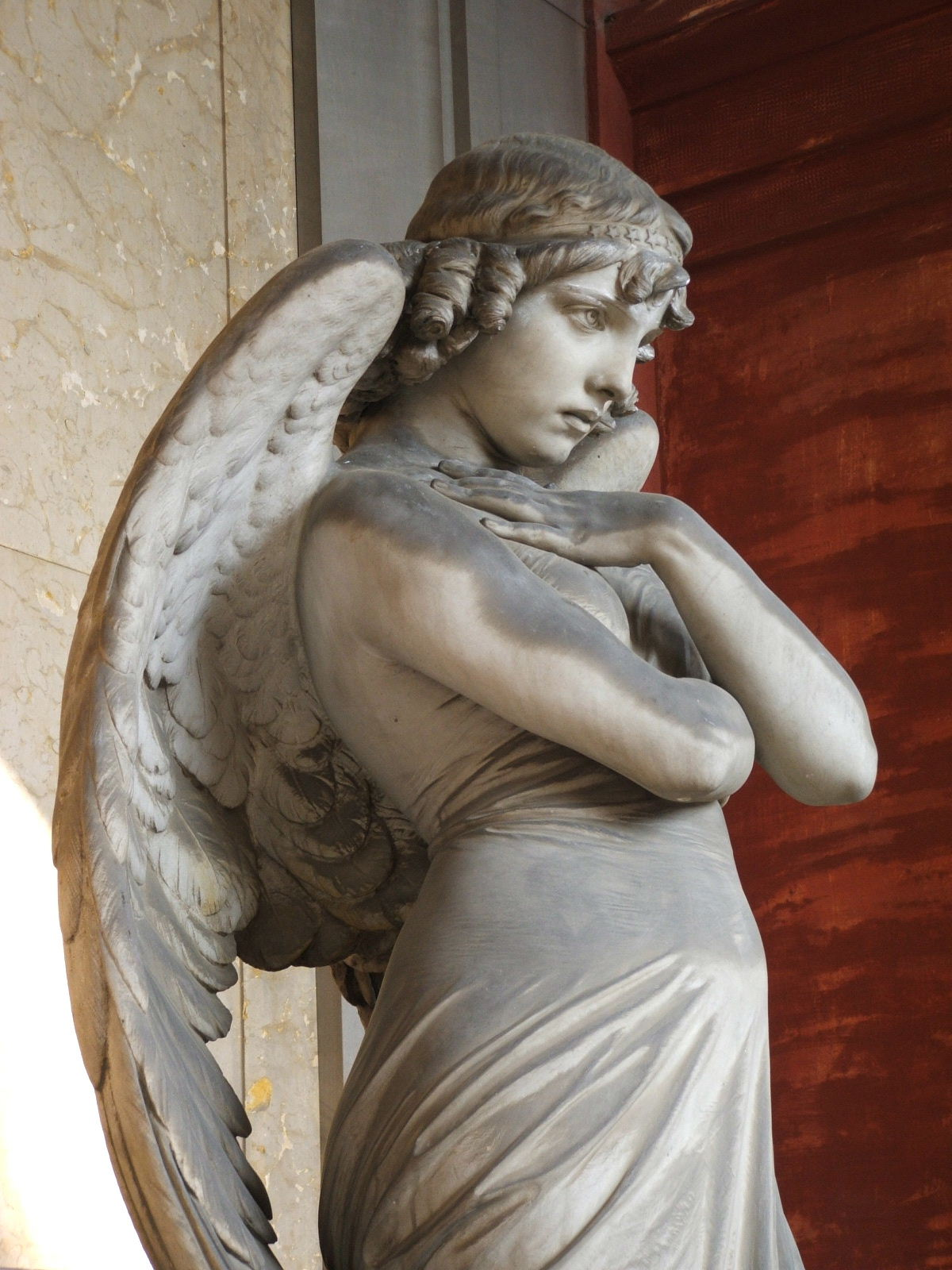

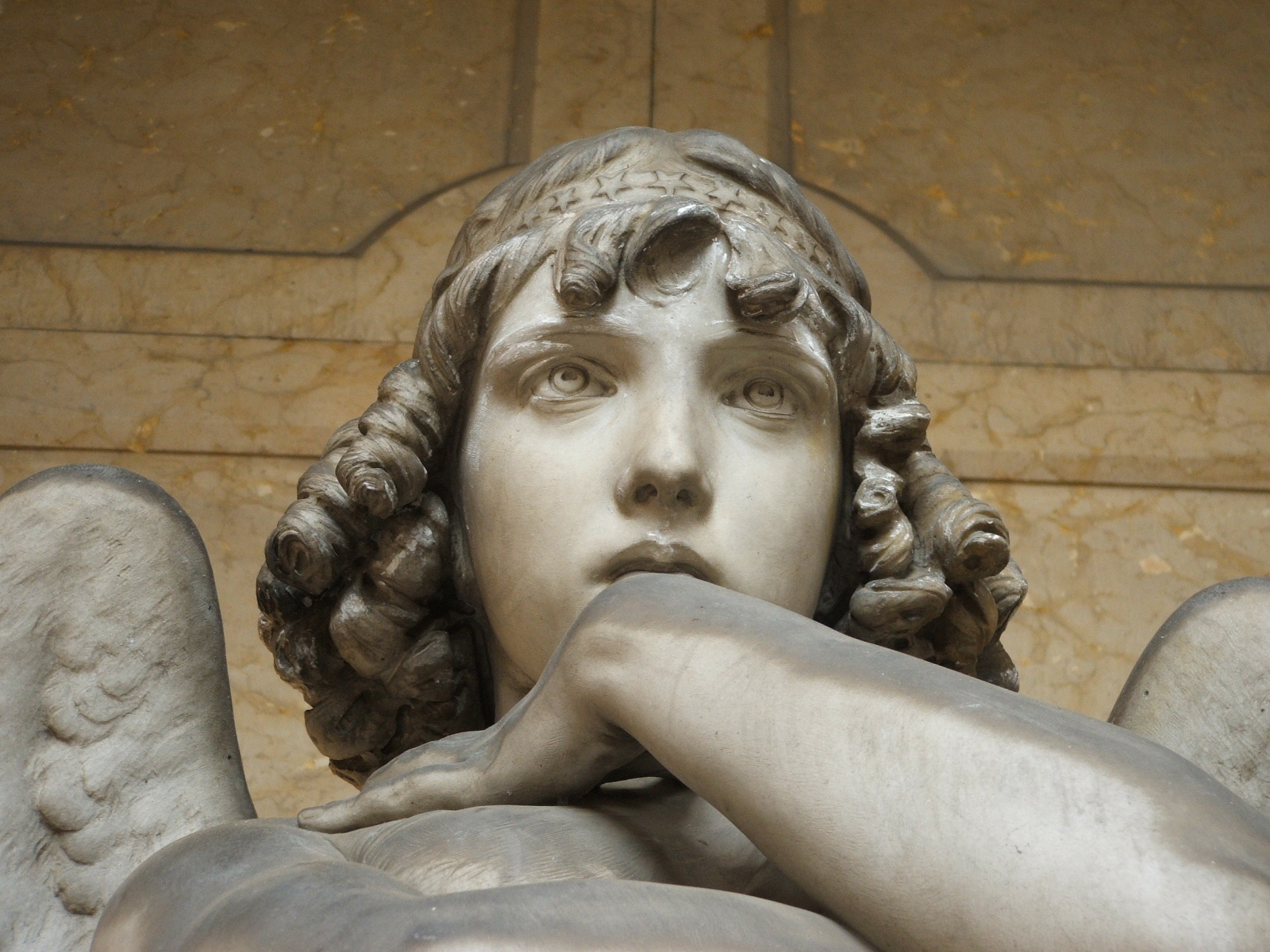

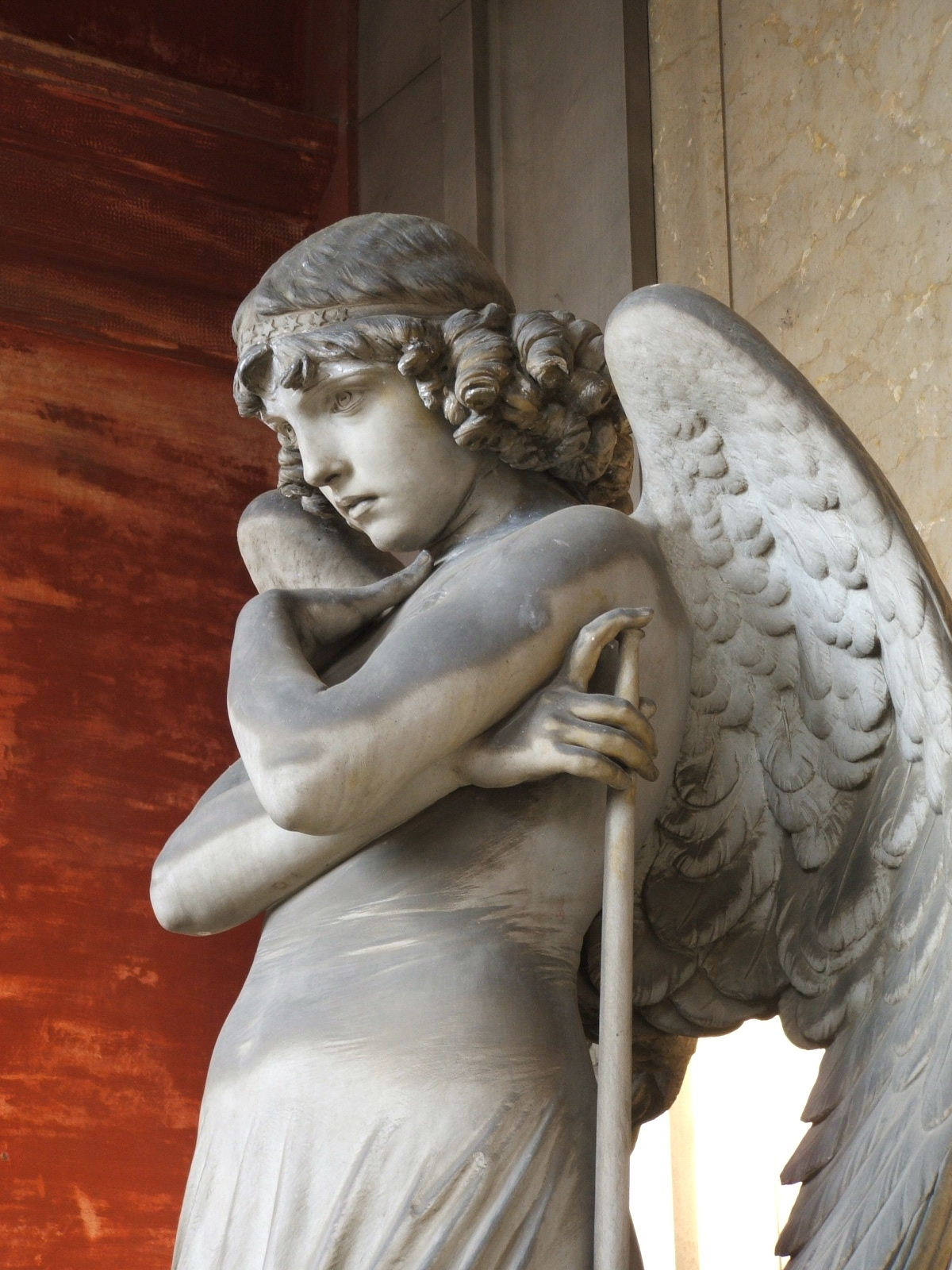

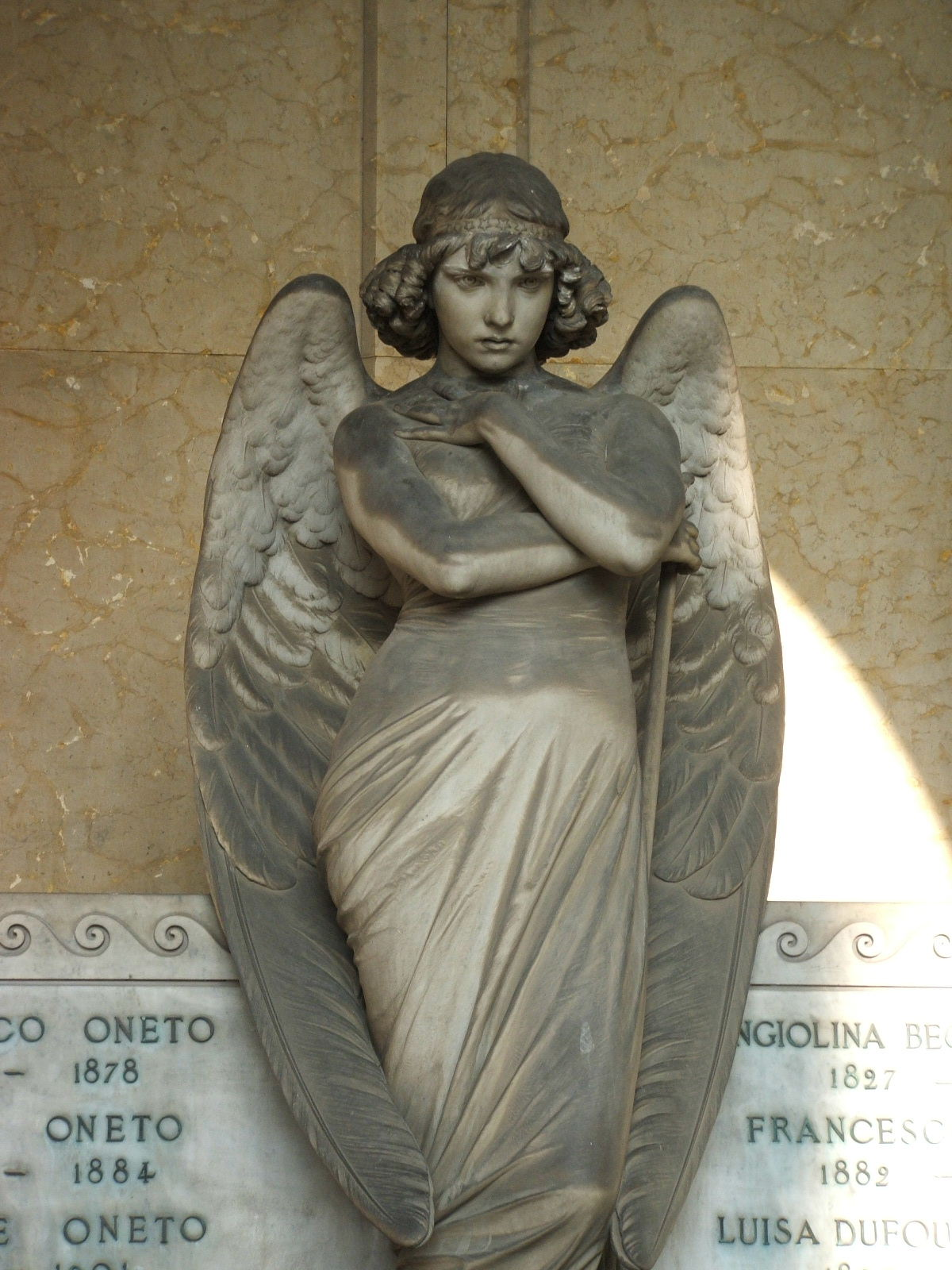

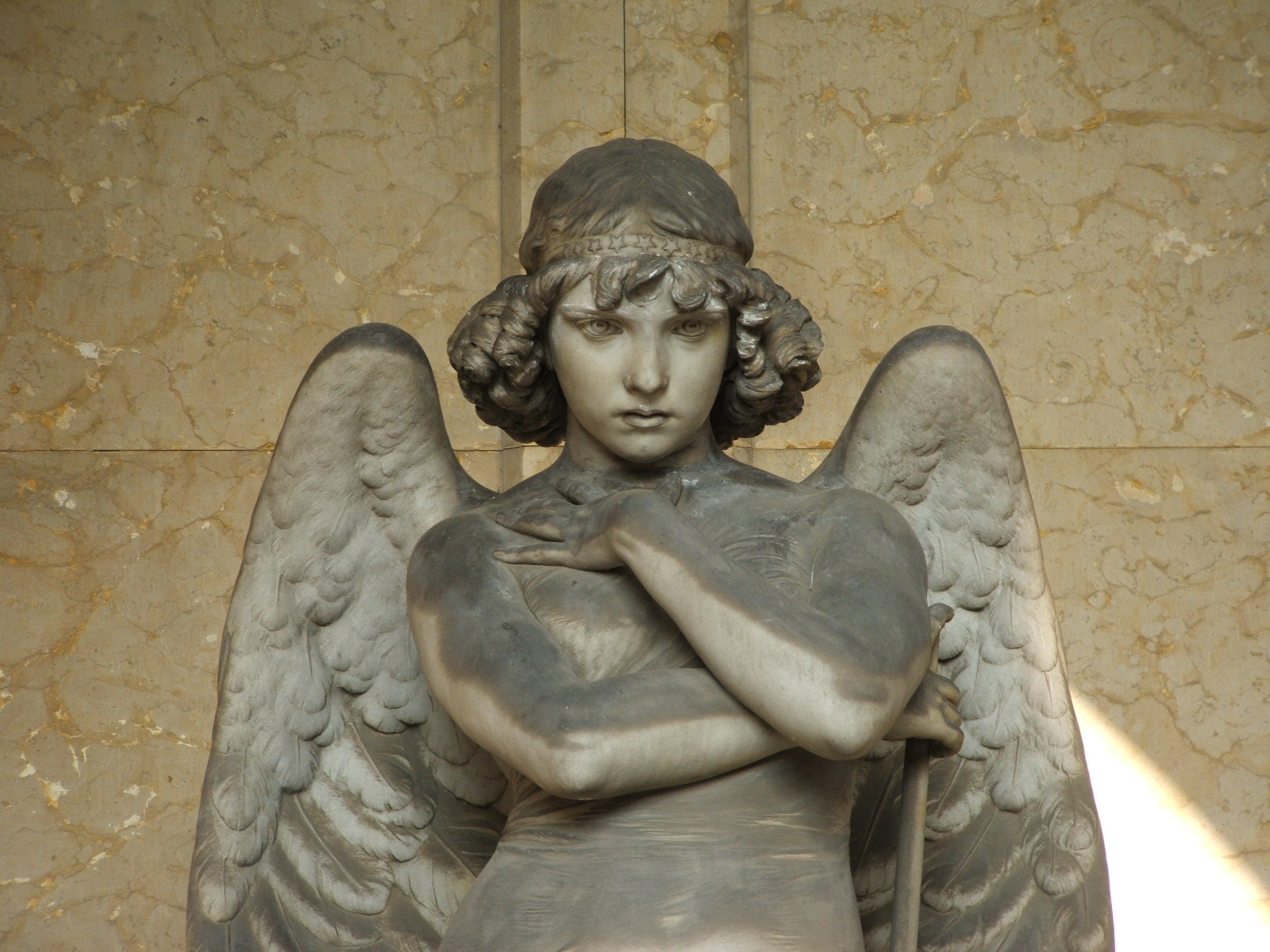

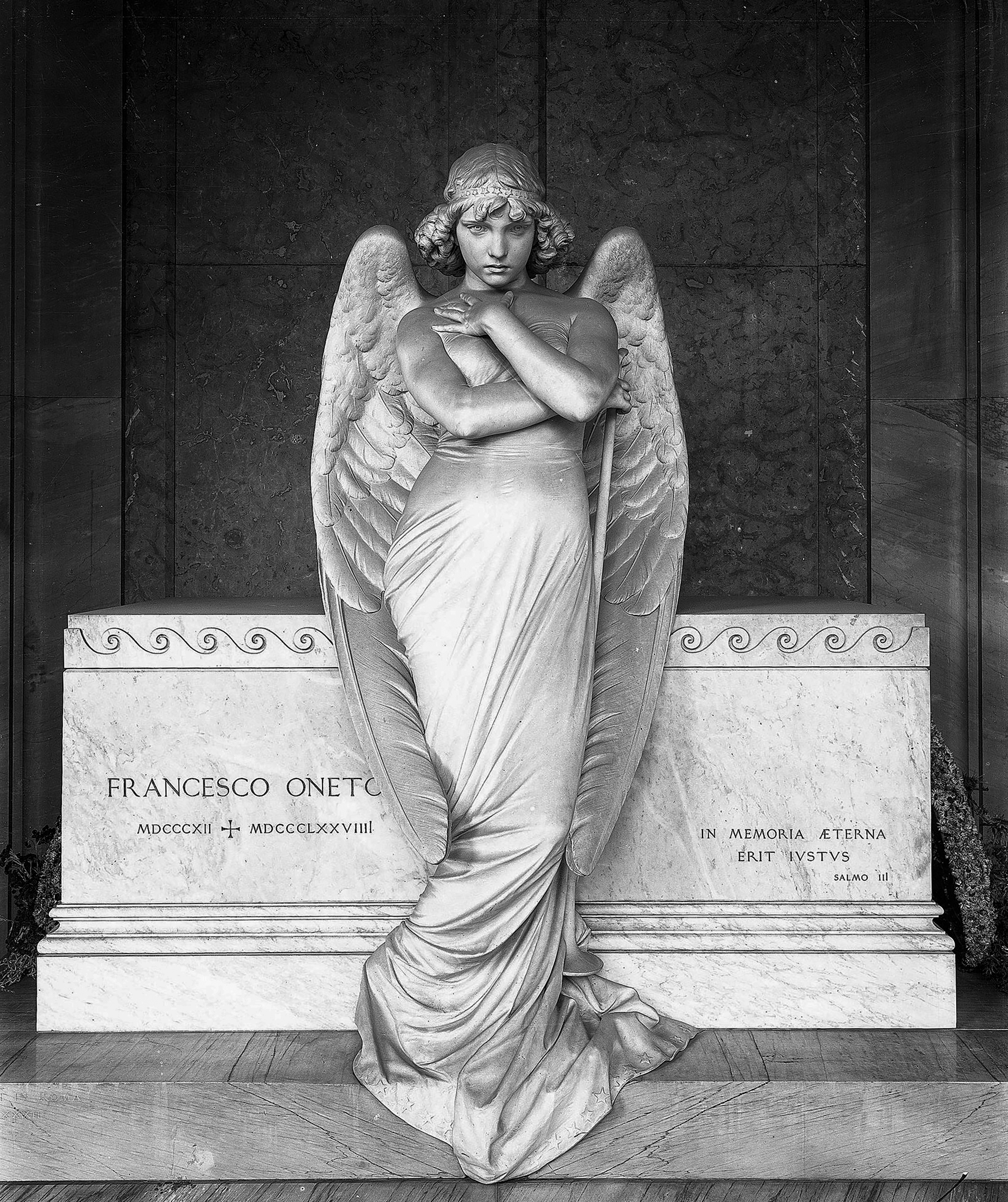

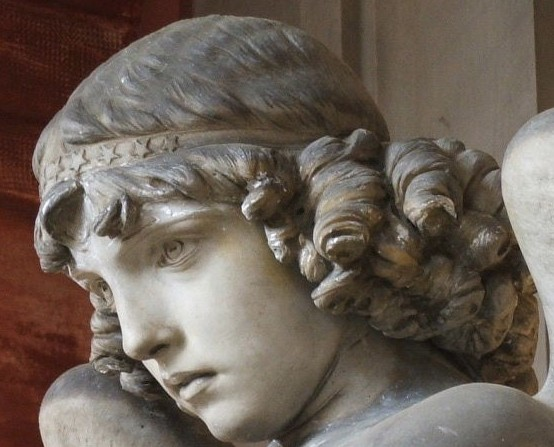

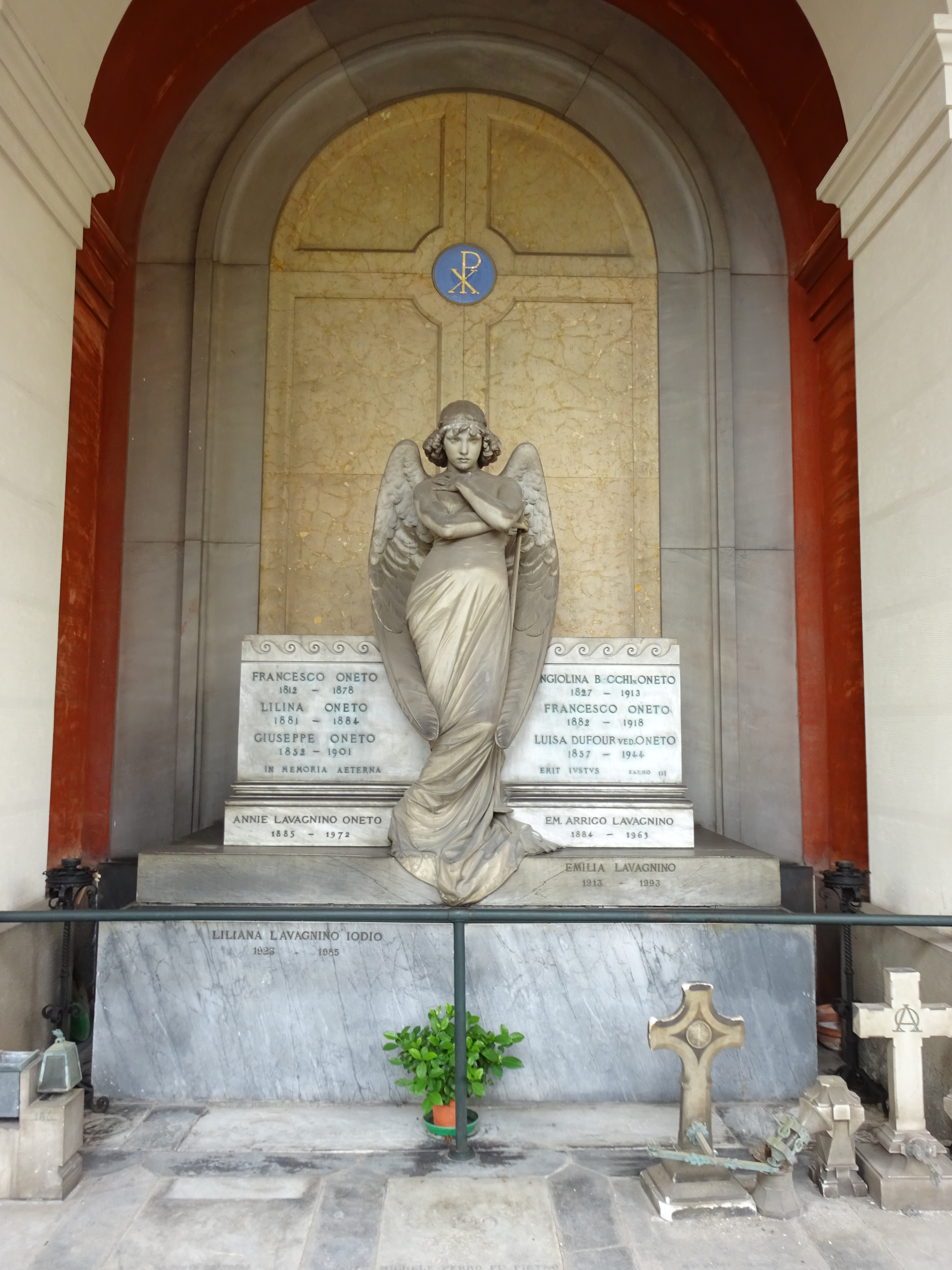

== Bibliography ==
- F.Resasco, La Necropoli di Staglieno, Genova 1892
- T.Crombie, The Sculptors of Staglieno, Genoese nineteenth-century funerary monuments, in Apollo 1973 n. 135
- R.Bossaglia-M.F.Giubilei, Cadaveri eccellenti, in Arte 1982, n. 124
- F.Sborgi (a cura di), L'Ottocento e il Novecento. Dal Neoclassicismo al Liberty, in La scultura a Genova e in Liguria. Dal Seicento al primo Novecento, Genova 1988
- G.Berengo Gardin-G.Nessi Parlato, Il giardino del tempo, Pomezia 1993
- F.Sborgi, Staglieno e la scultura funeraria ligure tra Ottocento e Novecento, Torino 1997
- S.Diéguez Patao-C.Gimènez (a cura di), Arte y architectura funeraria, Dublin, Genova, Madrid (XIX-XX), Torino, Electa España 2000
- G.Berengo Gardin-G.Nessi Parlato, Staglieno, Giganti di marmo. Marble Giants, Tormena 2002

== See also ==
- Copies of Monteverde's Oneto Angel outside of Genova (Commons Category)
