= The Last Innocent White Man in America =

- Author: John Leonard
- Language: English
- Genre: Non-fiction; Social criticism
- Published: 1993
- Publisher: New Press
- Publication place: United States
- ISBN: 9781565840720

The Last Innocent White Man in America is a 1993 collection of essays by John Leonard. The essays in the book cover a wide variety of topics, including HIV/AIDS, the United States Congress, New York City Mayor Ed Koch, and writer Salman Rushdie.

== Critical reception ==
The New York Times, "Includes long and provocative articles on the Rodney King riots, the Persian Gulf war and the 1960's, as well as expansive meditations on writers like Toni Morrison and Gabriel Garcia Marquez."

The Seattle Times, "Best of all, Leonard doesn't always say what we want to hear. "If you want congratulations," he argues, "buy a greeting card and mail it to yourself.""

== See also ==
- White guilt
