= Santo Varni =

Italian sculptor (1807–1885)

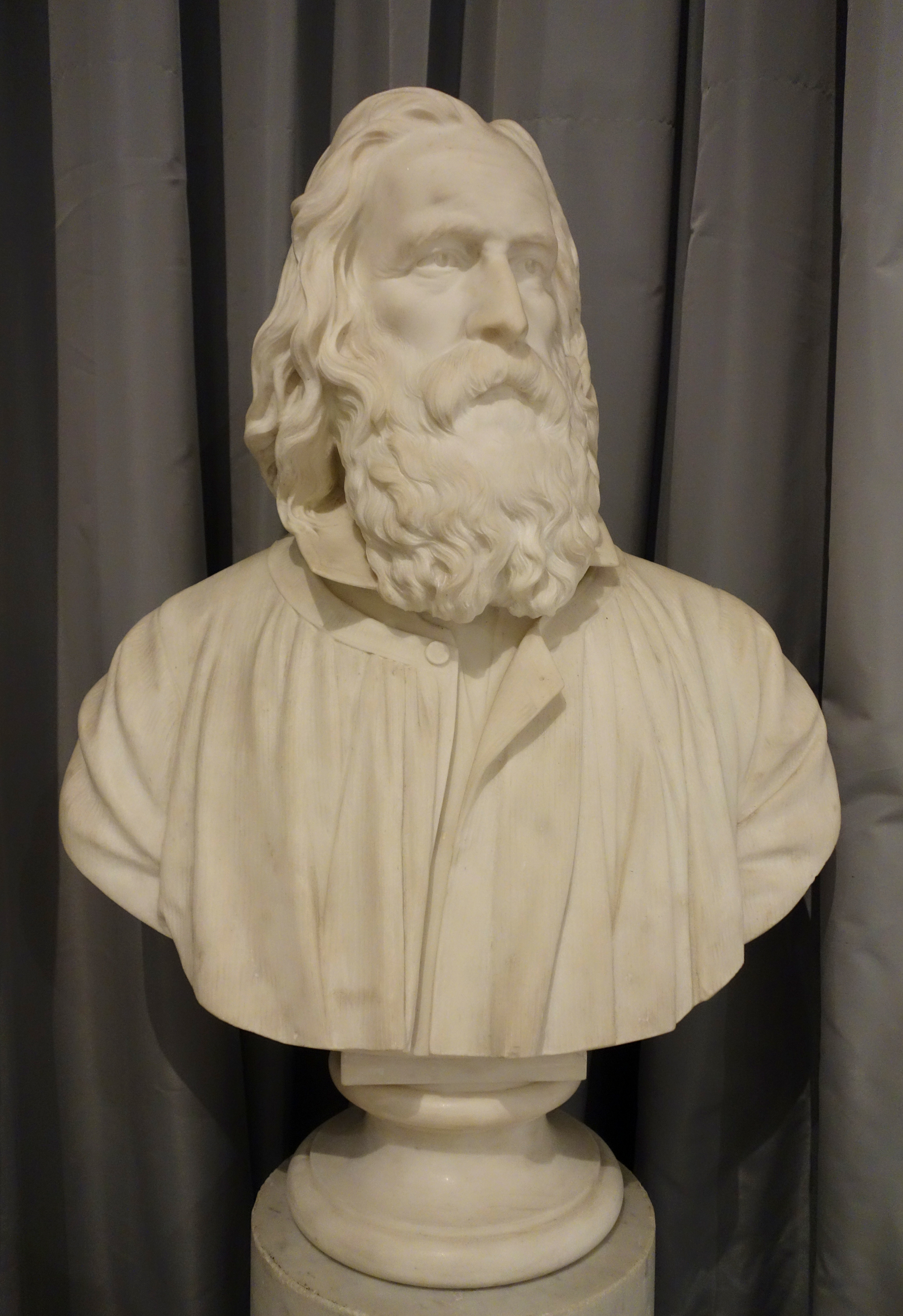
- Santo Varni by Maria Ighina Barbano, 1894
- Born: 1807
- Died: 1885 (aged 77–78)
- Known for: Sculpture

Santo Varni (1807–1885) was an Italian sculptor active mainly in Liguria.

He was born in Genoa and began his training at the Accademia Ligustica di Belle Arti, where he was a pupil of Giuseppe Gaggini. He moved to Florence, where he was a pupil of Lorenzo Bartolini. He is represented by more than forty works at the Monumental Cemetery of Staglieno in Genoa. These include the tomb of Bracelli Spinola (1864), the tomb of Andrea Tagliacane (1870), and the tomb of Asarta (1879). He began teaching at the Accademia Liguistica in Genoa in 1838, and when Gaggini left for Turin, Varni filled his post, serving until his death in 1885. His large collection of drawings and works of local artists was dispersed after his death. Among his pupils were Eugenio Baroni and Antonio Allegretti.

== Works ==
- Madonna and Saints, Basilica della Annunziata.
- Triumph of Marcellus.
- Statue of Religion at the base of the Columbus Monument at Piazza Acquaverde, Genoa.
- Laura Al Bagno (1858), private collection.
- Love taming Force (1858–1865), Palazzo Bianco, Genoa .
- Monument for the Giuditta (1875) .
- Portrait of Federico Peschiera, marble bust .
- Portrait of Eugenio Spinola, bust .
- Portrait of Francesco Cogorno, signed and dated bust: (1869).
- Mausoleum Francisco Girbau y Tauler (1874), mausoleum for the city of Lima .
- Polychrome marble fountain, apartment of the Princes in Palazzo Reale, Genoa .
- Tomb of Bracelli Spinola.
- Statue of Emanuele Filiberto (1866) at Royal Palace of Turin.
- Bust of Queen Maria Pia at Ajuda National Palace, Lisbon.

== Gallery ==
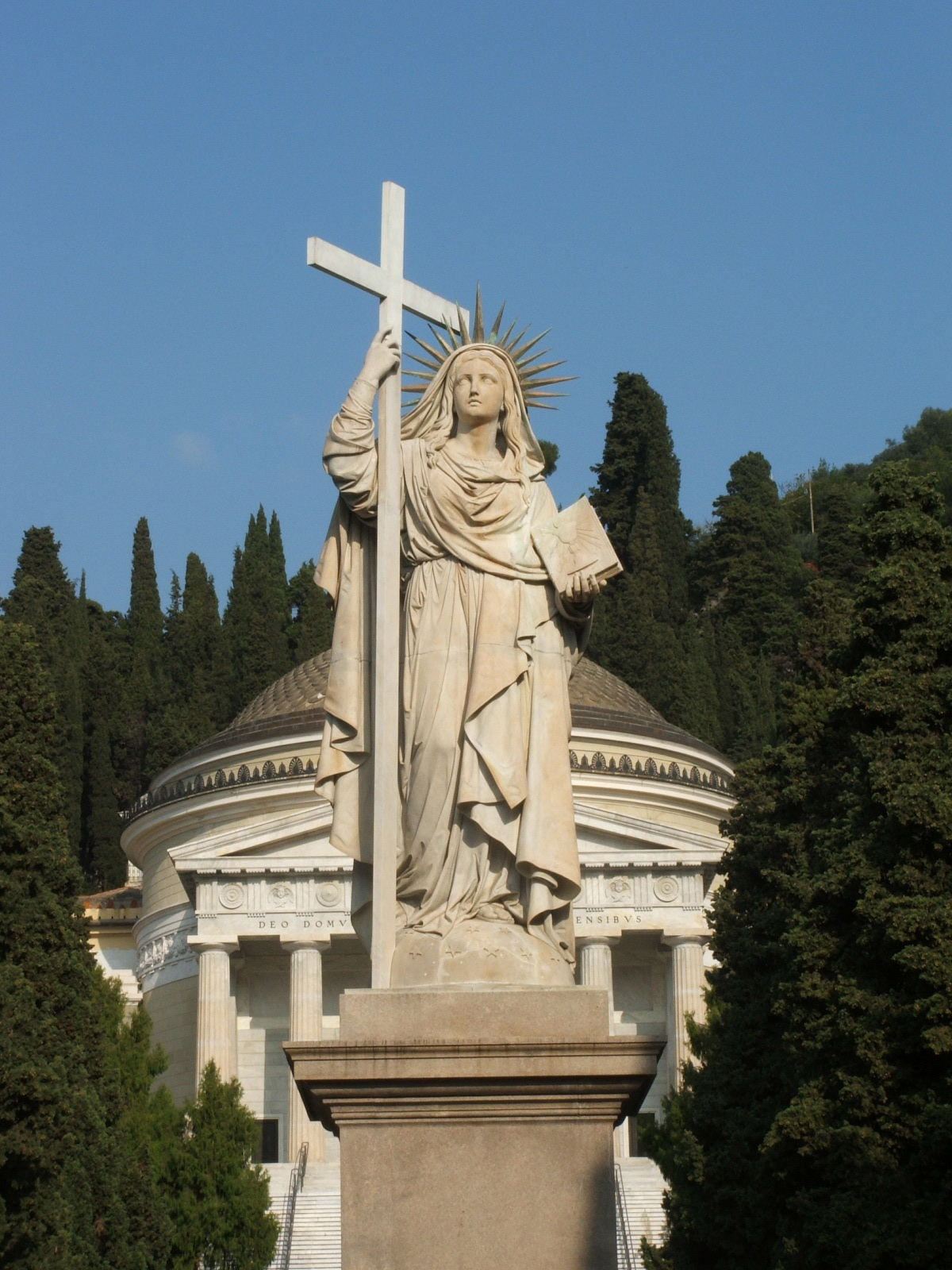
Statue of Faith at Monumental Cemetery of Staglieno

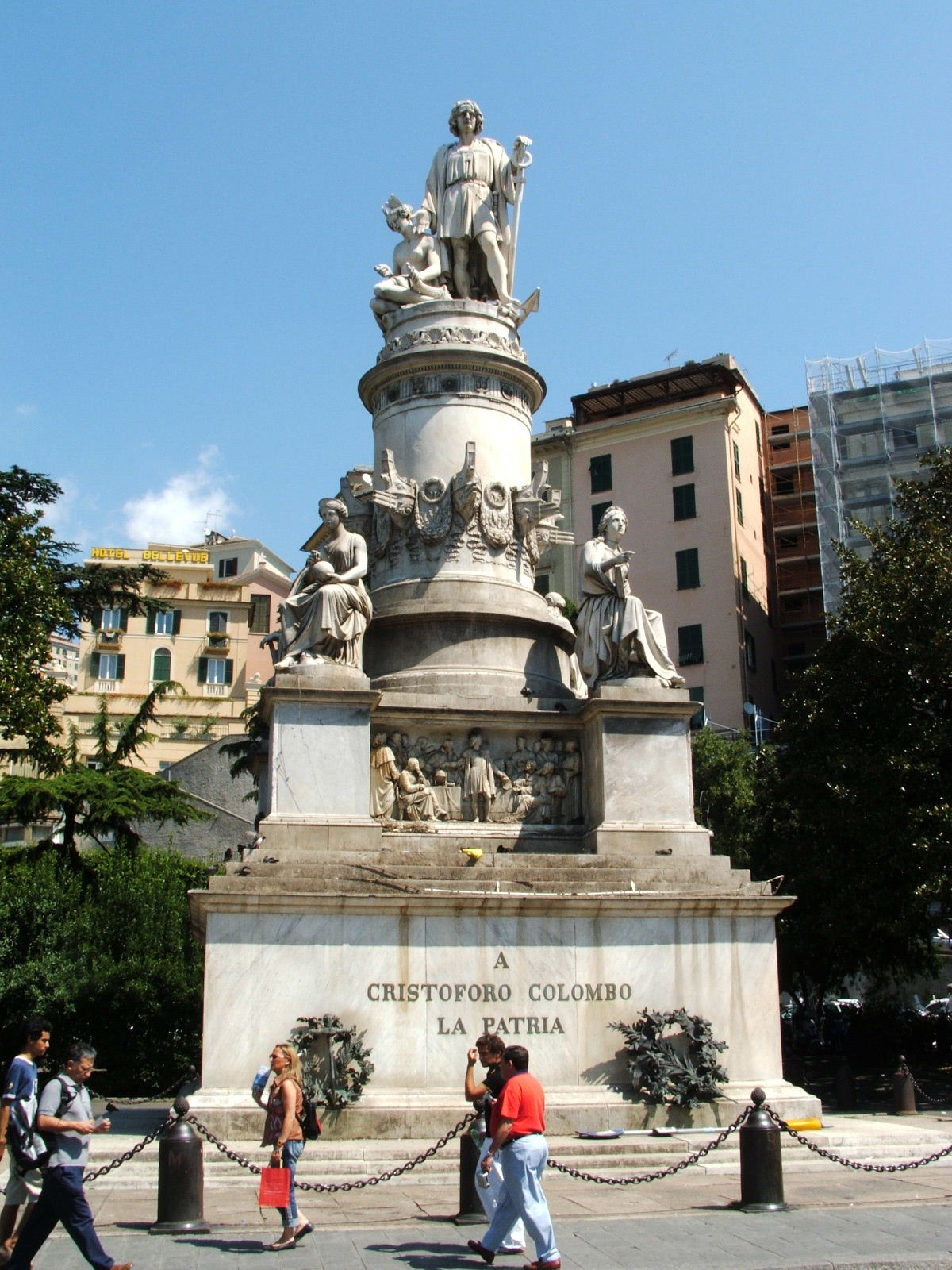
Statue of Christopher Columbus in the garden in Piazza Acquaverde

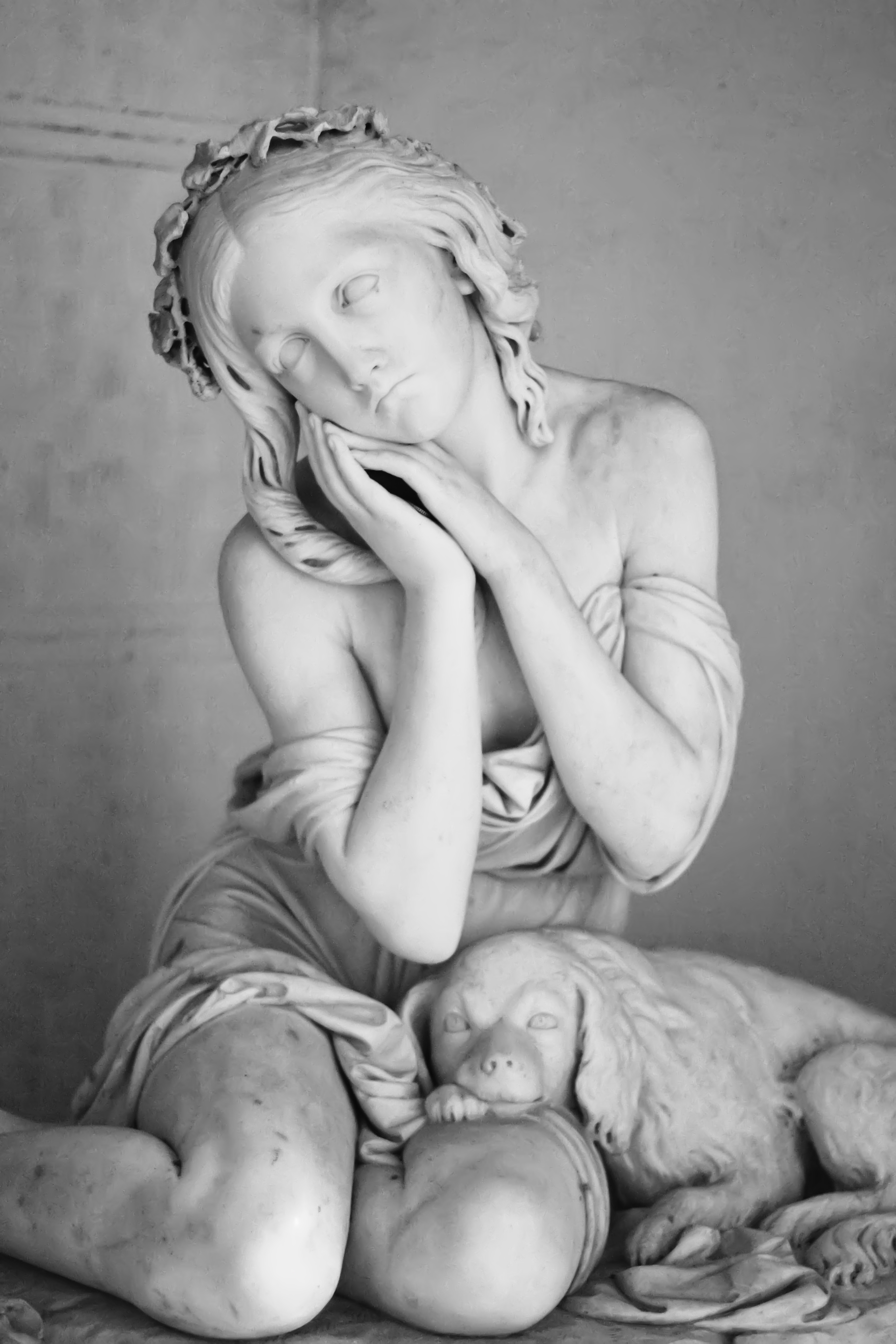
Tomb of his wife Giuditta Varni

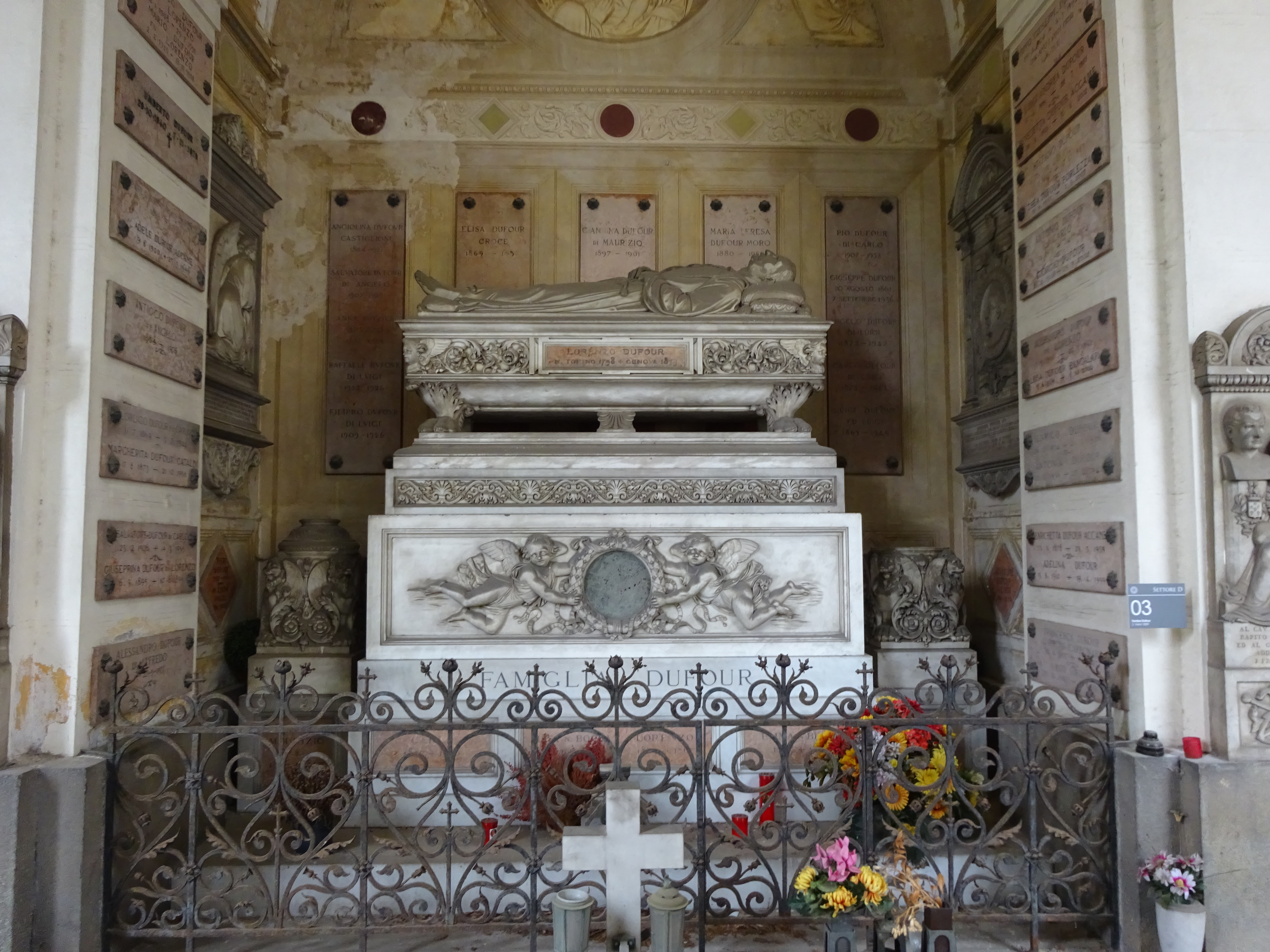
Tomb of the Dufour family at Monumental Cemetery of Staglieno in Genoa

== Sources ==
- Entry in Treccani Enciclopedia Italiana
- Rollins Willard, Ashton (1830). History of Modern Italian Art. Longmans, Green, and Co., 39 Paternoster Row, London, New York and Bombay, 1898. pp. 127–129.
