= Daniel Lysons =

Daniel Lysons may refer to:

- Daniel Lysons (antiquarian) (1762–1834), English antiquarian and topographer
- Daniel Lysons (British Army officer) (1816–1898), British general, son of the antiquarian
- Daniel Lysons (physician) (1727–1800), English academic and physician, uncle of the antiquarian
