= HD 40873 =

Star in the constellation Auriga

- Location of HD 40873 (circled)

Observation data Epoch J2000 Equinox ICRS
- Constellation: Auriga
- Right ascension: 06^{h} 04^{m} 29.12056^{s}
- Declination: +51° 34′ 24.2287″
- Apparent magnitude (V): 6.45

Characteristics
- Evolutionary stage: main sequence
- Spectral type: A7 V or A7 III
- U−B color index: +0.16
- B−V color index: +0.196±0.007

Astrometry
Radial velocity (R_{v})	19.6±2.9 km/s
Proper motion (μ)	RA: +1.390 mas/yr Dec.: −44.061 mas/yr
Parallax (π)	7.9421±0.01527 mas
Distance	410.7 ± 0.8 ly (125.9 ± 0.2 pc)
Absolute magnitude (M_{V})	0.76

Details
Mass	1.96 M_{☉}
Radius	3.43 R_{☉}
Luminosity	45 L_{☉}
Surface gravity (log g)	3.66 cgs
Temperature	8,074 K
Rotational velocity (v sin i)	134 km/s
Age	213 Myr

Other designations
- 35 Camelopardalis, NSV 2804, BD+51°1146, FK5 2463, HD 40873, HIP 28765, HR 2123, SAO 25548

Database references
SIMBAD	data

HD 40873 is a star in the northern constellation of Auriga, a few degrees to the south of Delta Aurigae. Located around 411 light-years distant, it shines with a luminosity approximately 45 times that of the Sun and has an effective temperature of 8,074 K. It is a suspected variable star and has a fairly rapid rotation rate, showing a projected rotational velocity of 134 km/s. Eggen (1985) suggested it is a probable member of the Hyades Supercluster.

Samuel Molyneux named this star Telescopica in Auriga. Flamsteed catalogued it as 35 Camelopardalis Heveliana, which is the name James Bradley continued to use, although it is within the borders of the modern constellation Auriga. Francis Baily reclassified it to Auriga as star 1924 in the British Association's 1845 Catalogue of 8377 Stars.

HD 40873 is considered to be an Am star, a chemically peculiar star with unusually strong absorption lines of metals. It has been given a spectral type of kA5mA7IV, although other catalogues have given more normal classifications such as A7 V or A7 III.

== Components ==
HD 40873 has a 9th magnitude class A5 companion about half an arc-minute away. It is designated as SAO 25549. The companion is itself a pair of stars, each of similar brightness, separated by 0.6".
