= Kroppedal =

Danish museum

Coordinates: 55°41′05″N 12°18′42″E

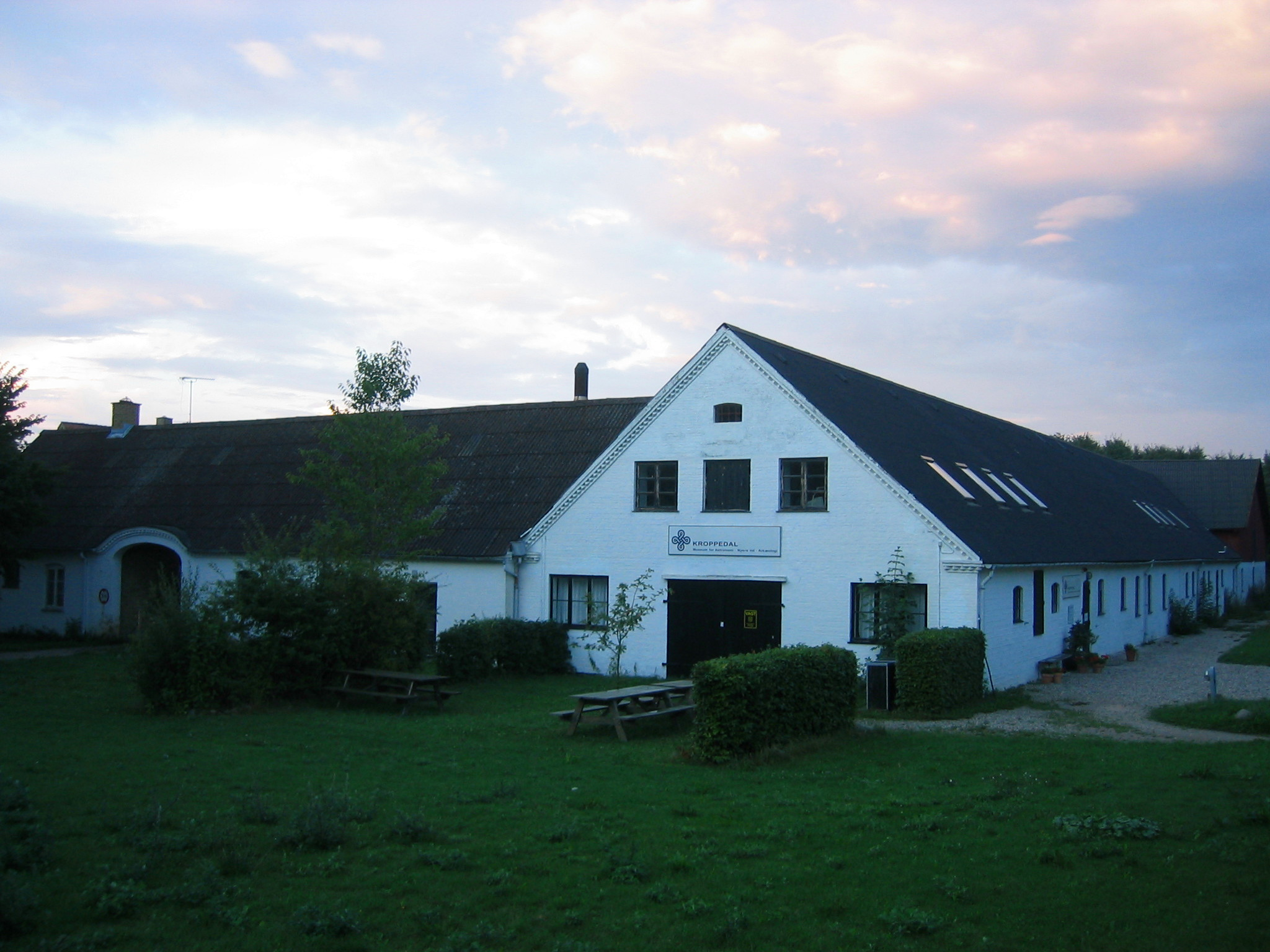
Kroppedal Museum in Vridsløsemagle, Denmark

Kroppedal is a cultural-historical and astronomical museum in Vridsløsemagle 20 km (12 mi) from Copenhagen, Denmark. Kroppedal is the national museum of Danish astronomy, has a large archaeological unit, and an ethnological unit specializing in modern society.

== History ==
Kroppedal was established in 2002 by an amalgamation of the Ole Rømer Museum and the Antiquarian Unit in Copenhagen County. The museum has a permanent exhibition centred on noted astronomer and engineer Ole Rømer (1644–1710). Kroppedal is located near the site of Ole Rømer's Tusculanum Observatory. Its collections include his only surviving pendulum clock.
