= Light-time correction =

Apparent position of an object due to the speed of light

Light-time correction is a displacement in the apparent position of a celestial object from its true position (or geometric position) caused by the object's motion during the time it takes its light to reach an observer.

Light-time correction occurs in principle during the observation of any moving object, because the speed of light is finite. The magnitude and direction of the displacement in position depends upon the distance of the object from the observer and the motion of the object, and is measured at the instant at which the object's light reaches the observer. It is independent of the motion of the observer. It should be contrasted with the aberration of light, which depends upon the instantaneous velocity of the observer at the time of observation, and is independent of the motion or distance of the object.

Light-time correction can be applied to any object whose distance and motion are known. In particular, it is usually necessary to apply it to the motion of a planet or other Solar System object. For this reason, the combined displacement of the apparent position due to the effects of light-time correction and aberration is known as planetary aberration. By convention, light-time correction is not applied to the positions of stars, because their motion and distance may not be known accurately.

== Calculation ==
A calculation of light-time correction usually involves an iterative process. An approximate light-time is calculated by dividing the object's geometric distance from Earth by the speed of light. Then the object's velocity is multiplied by this approximate light-time to determine its approximate displacement through space during that time. Its previous position is used to calculate a more precise light-time. This process is repeated as necessary. For planetary motions, a few (3–5) iterations are sufficient to match the accuracy of the underlying ephemerides.

== Discovery ==
The effect of the finite speed of light on observations of celestial objects was first recognised by Ole Rømer in 1675, during a series of observations of eclipses of the moons of Jupiter. He found that the interval between eclipses was less when Earth and Jupiter are approaching each other, and more when they are moving away from each other. He correctly deduced that this difference was caused by the appreciable time it took for light to travel from Jupiter to the observer on Earth.
