= James Bradley =

English astronomer (1692–1762)

The Reverend James Bradley FRS
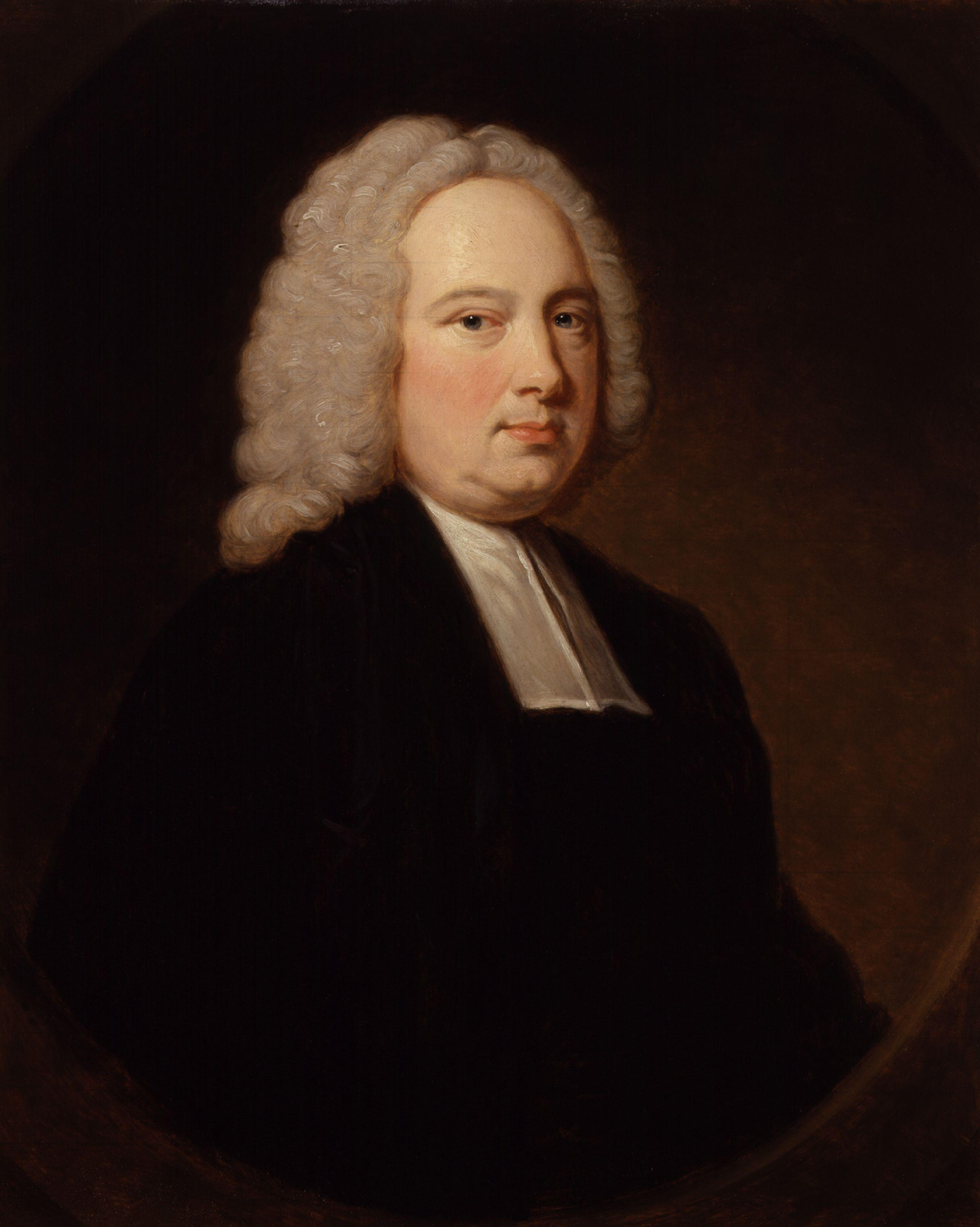
- Portrait by Thomas Hudson, c. 1744
- Born: September 1692; Sherborne, Gloucestershire, England
- Died: 13 July 1762 (aged 69); Chalford, Gloucestershire, England
- Education: Balliol College, Oxford
- Known for: Aberration of light; Astronomer Royal
- Children: 1 daughter
- Awards: Copley Medal (1748)
- Scientific career
- Fields: Astronomy
- Workplaces: University of Oxford; Ashmolean Museum

Ecclesiastical career
- Religion: Christianity (Anglican)
- Church: Church of England
- Ordained: 24 May 1719 (deacon); c. July 1719 (priest)

3rd Astronomer Royal
- In office 1742–1762
- Preceded by: Edmond Halley
- Succeeded by: Nathaniel Bliss

James Bradley (September 1692 – 13 July 1762) was an English astronomer and priest who served as the third Astronomer Royal from 1742. He is best known for two fundamental discoveries in astronomy, the aberration of light (1725–1728), and the nutation of the Earth's axis (1728–1748).

These two discoveries were called "the most brilliant and useful of the century" by Jean Baptiste Joseph Delambre, historian of astronomy, mathematical astronomer and director of the Paris Observatory. In his History of astronomy in the 18th century (1821), Delambre stated:

"It is to these two discoveries by Bradley that we owe the exactness of modern astronomy. ... This double service assures to their discoverer the most distinguished place (after Hipparchus and Kepler) above the greatest astronomers of all ages and all countries."

== Biography ==
Bradley was born at Sherborne, near Cheltenham in Gloucestershire, to William Bradley and Jane Pound in September 1692. (Note: The usually given date of birth of March 1693 (N.S.) is conjecture, as the parish register is missing. The Bishop's transcript records his baptism on 3 October 1692.) His nephew John was also an astronomer. After attending Westwood's Grammar School at Northleach in Gloucestershire, he entered Balliol College, Oxford, on 15 March 1711, and took degrees of Bachelor of Arts and Master of Arts in 1714 and 1717 respectively. His early observations were made at the rectory of Wanstead in Essex, under the tutelage of James Pound, his uncle and a skilled astronomer. Bradley was elected a fellow of the Royal Society on 6 November 1718.

He took orders on becoming vicar of Bridstow in Herefordshire in the following year, and a small sinecure living in Wales was also procured for him by his friend Samuel Molyneux. He resigned his ecclesiastical preferments in 1721, when appointed to the Savilian chair of astronomy at Oxford. As reader on experimental philosophy from 1729 to 1760, he delivered 79 courses of lectures at the Ashmolean Museum.

In 1742, Bradley was appointed to succeed Edmond Halley as Astronomer Royal; his reputation enabled him to apply successfully for a set of instruments costing £1,000; and with an 8-foot quadrant completed for him in 1750 by John Bird, he accumulated at Greenwich in ten years materials of inestimable value for the reform of astronomy. A crown pension of £250 a year was conferred upon him in 1752.

Bradley retired in broken health, nine years later, to the Cotswold village of Chalford in Gloucestershire. He had medical attention from a local doctor, and Daniel Lysons from Oxford. He died at Skiveralls House on 13 July 1762 and was buried in the churchyard of Holy Trinity church, Minchinhampton in Gloucestershire. His wife died before him, in 1757 and he was survived by one daughter.

== Works ==
In 1722, Bradley measured the angular diameter of Venus with a large aerial telescope with an objective focal length of 212 ft (65 m).

Bradley's discovery of the aberration of light was made while attempting to detect stellar parallax. Bradley worked with Samuel Molyneux until Molyneux's death in 1728, trying to measure the parallax of Gamma Draconis.

This stellar parallax ought to have shown up, if it existed at all, as a small annual cyclical motion of the apparent position of the star. However, while Bradley and Molyneux did not find the expected apparent motion due to parallax, they found instead a different and unexplained annual cyclical motion. Shortly after Molyneux's death, Bradley realised that this was caused by what is now known as the aberration of light. (Note: A Letter from the Reverend Mr. James Bradley Savilian Professor of Astronomy at Oxford, and F.R.S. to Dr. Edmond Halley Astronom. Reg. &c. Giving an Account of a New Discovered Motion of the Fix'd Stars. Philosophical Transactions 35 (406), no. 1727: 637–61.) The basis on which Bradley distinguished the annual motion actually observed from the expected motion due to parallax, was that its annual timetable was different.

Calculation showed that if there had been any appreciable motion due to parallax, then the star should have reached its most southerly apparent position in December, and its most northerly apparent position in June. What Bradley found instead was an apparent motion that reached its most southerly point in March, and its most northerly point in September; and that could not be accounted for by parallax: the cause of a motion with the pattern actually seen was at first obscure.

A story has often been told, probably apocryphally, that the solution to the problem eventually occurred to Bradley while he was in a sailing boat on the River Thames. He noticed that when the boat turned about, a small flag at the top of the mast (a telltale) changed its direction, even though the wind had not changed; the only thing that had changed was the direction and speed of the boat. Bradley worked out the consequences of supposing that the direction and speed of the Earth in its orbit, combined with a consistent speed of light from the star, might cause the apparent changes of stellar position that he observed. He found that this fitted the observations well, and also gave an estimate for the speed of light, and showed that the stellar parallax, if any, with extremes in June and December, was far too small to measure at the precision available to Bradley. (The smallness of any parallax, compared with expectations, also showed that the stars must be many times more distant from the Earth than anybody had previously believed.)

This discovery of what became known as the aberration of light was, for all realistic purposes, conclusive evidence for the movement of the Earth, and hence for the correctness of Aristarchus', Copernicus', and Kepler's theories; it was announced to the Royal Society in January 1729.

The theory of the aberration also gave Bradley a means to improve on the accuracy of the previous estimate of the speed of light, which had previously been estimated by the work of Ole Rømer and others. Bradley's published value for the speed of light, expressed as a time of 8 minutes 12 seconds for light to travel the distance between the Earth and the Sun, was only about 1.3% too high, and was the first accurate determination of this fundamental physical constant.

The earliest observations upon which the discovery of the aberration was founded were made at Molyneux's house on Kew Green, and were continued at the house of Bradley's uncle James Pound in Wanstead, Essex. After publication of his work on the aberration, Bradley continued to observe, to develop and check his second major discovery, the nutation of the Earth's axis, but he did not announce this in print until 14 February 1748, when he had tested its reality by minute observations during an entire revolution (18.6 years) of the moon's nodes.

The publication of Bradley's observations was delayed by disputes about their ownership; but they were finally issued by the Clarendon Press, Oxford, in two folio volumes (1798, 1805). The insight and industry of the German astronomer Friedrich Wilhelm Bessel were, however, needed for the development of their fundamental importance.
