= Daniel Lysons (antiquarian) =

English antiquarian (1762–1834)

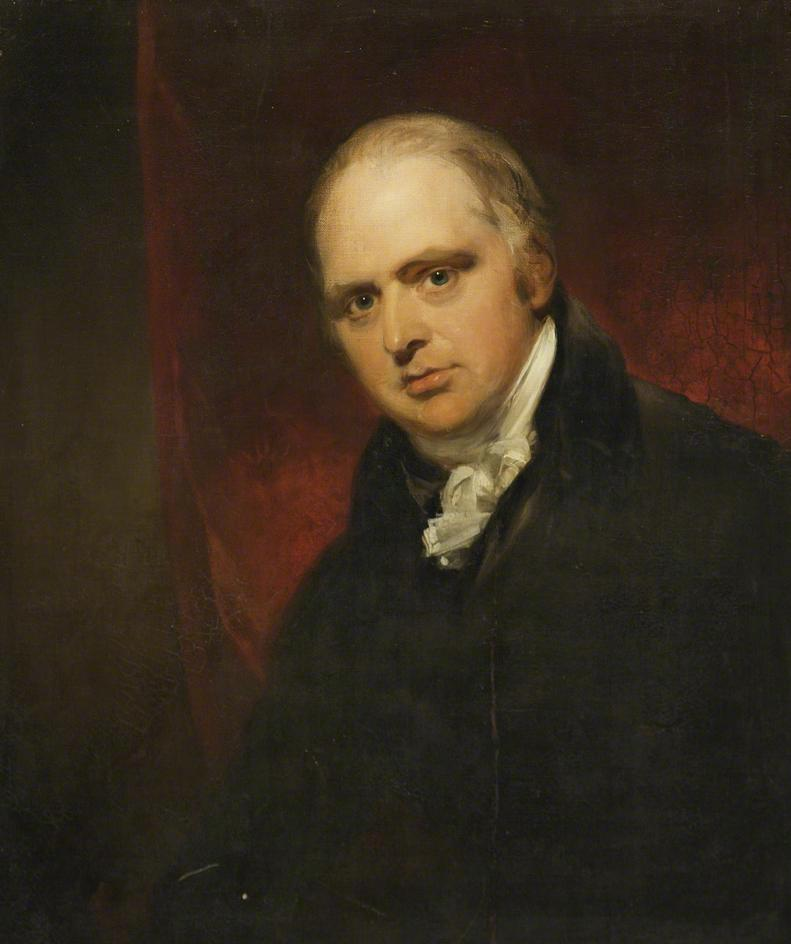
A portrait of Lysons from the collection of the Gloucester City Museum & Art Gallery

Daniel Lysons (1762–1834) was an English antiquarian and topographer, who published, amongst other works, the four-volume Environs of London (1792–96). He collaborated on several antiquarian works with his younger brother Samuel Lysons (1763–1819).

== Life ==
The son of the Reverend Samuel Lysons (1730–1804) and Mary Peach Lysons of Rodmarton, Gloucestershire, Lysons studied at Bath Grammar School and St Mary Hall, Oxford, graduating MA in 1785, and followed in his father's footsteps to become a curate in Putney, west London from 1789 to 1800. While at Putney, Lysons began his survey of the area around London, in which he was encouraged by Horace Walpole, who appointed him as his 'chaplain'.

In 1800, he inherited the family estates at Hempsted, near Gloucester, from his uncle Daniel Lysons (1727–1800).

=== First marriage and children ===
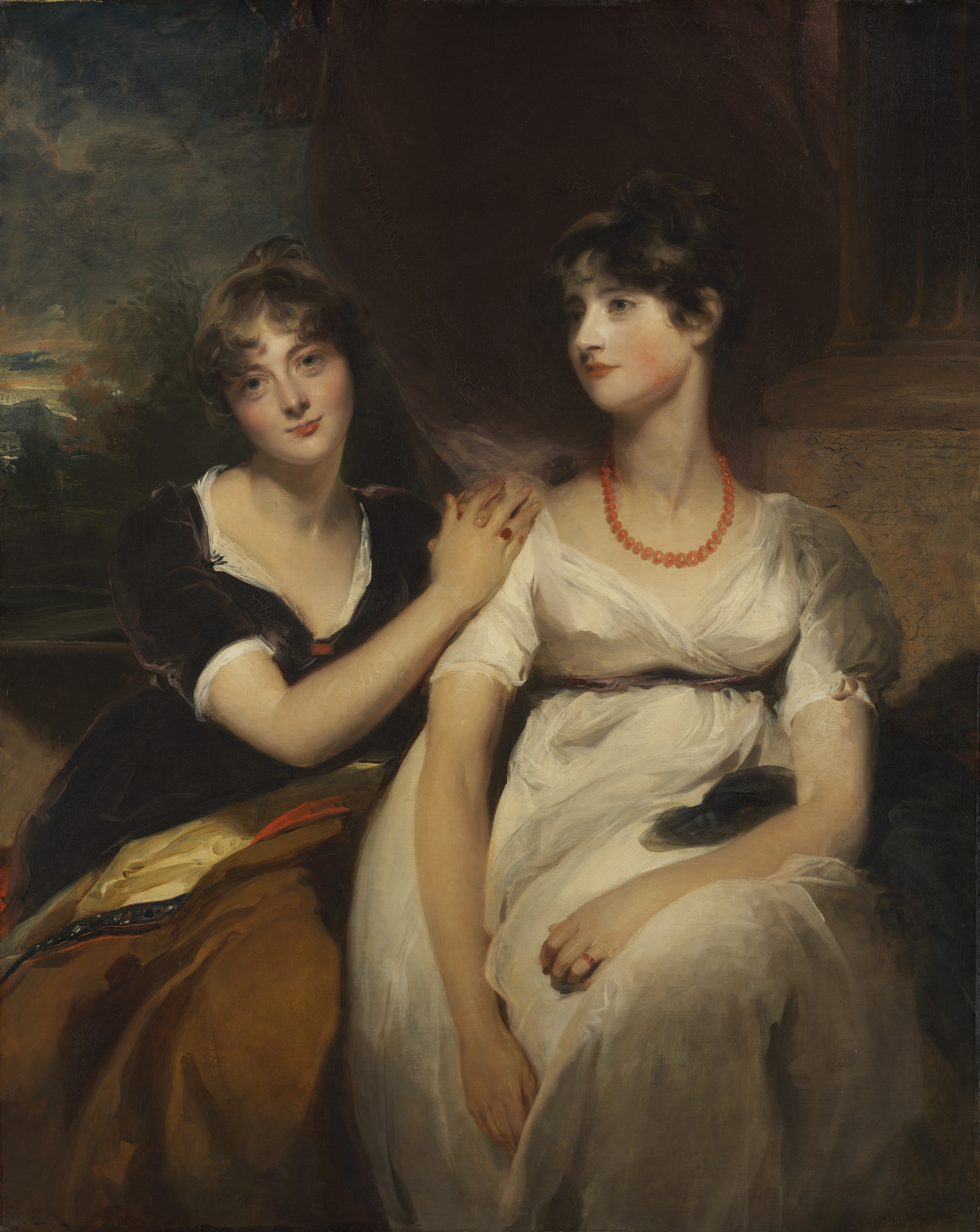
Charlotte & Sarah Carteret Hardy, by Sir Thomas Lawrence

Lysons married Sarah Carteret Hardy (c.1780–1808), the daughter of Lt Col Thomas Carteret Hardy, in Bath on 12 May 1801. A portrait of Sarah and her sister Charlotte was commissioned to be painted by Sir Thomas Lawrence just before the wedding. Although this picture was begun in 1801, it still was not finished in 1806 when a friend noted its presence in the artist's studio.

Their children included:

1. Daniel Lysons, born 9 May 1804.
2. Samuel Lysons, born 17 March 1806.
3. Charlotte Lysons, christened 6 Sep 1807. She went on to marry Sir James Carnegie, 5th Baronet (1799–1849).

Sarah died in 1808.

=== Second marriage ===
In 1813, Lysons married Josepha Catherine Susanna Cooper (c.1781–1868).

== Works ==
Lysons's major work is The Environs of London, being an Historical Account of the Towns, Villages and Hamlets within twelve miles of that Capital. With his brother Samuel, Lysons began Magna Britannia, being a concise Topographical Account of the several Counties of Great Britain (1806–1822), but after the first six volumes, covering the counties from B to D, Samuel died and the project was discontinued. Daniel Lysons also contributed views and illustrations to other works and published several pamphlets on religious and historical subjects.
