= Daniel Lysons (physician) =

English academic and physician (1727–1800)

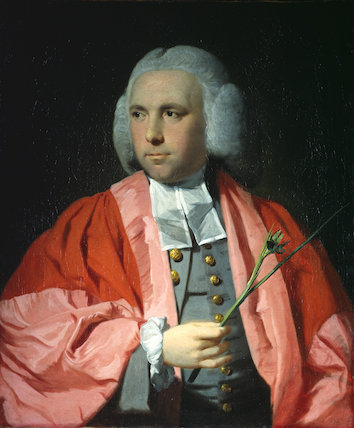
Dr Daniel Lysons

Daniel Lysons M.D. (1727–1800) was an English academic and physician.

== Life ==
Born on 21 March 1727, he was the eldest son of Daniel Lysons of Hempstead Court, Gloucestershire, by Elizabeth, daughter of Samuel Mee of Gloucester. He matriculated at Oxford as a gentleman-commoner of Magdalen College, Oxford on 2 March 1745, graduating B.A. in 1750, and M.A. in 1751; and was elected a Fellow of All Souls College, where he proceeded B.C.L. in 1755.

On 6 July 1756 Lysons was licensed to practise medicine, and in 1759 he became D.C.L., a degree he commuted for that of M.D. on 24 October 1769. He practised for a few years at Gloucester, and was physician to the infirmary there. About 1770 he settled at Bath, Somerset and in 1780 was elected one of the physicians to the Bath General Hospital. He died at Bath on 20 March 1800.

== Works ==
Lysons published:

- An Essay upon the Effects of Camphire and Calomel in Continual Fevers. ... To which is added an occasional Observation upon … Inoculation, London, 1771.
- Practical Essays upon Intermitting Fevers, Dropsies, Diseases of the Liver, Bath, 1772.
- Farther Observations on the Effects of Camphire and Calomel … Being an Appendix to Essays upon these Subjects formerly published, Bath, 1777.

== Family ==
By his marriage, on 6 December 1768, to Mary, daughter of Richard Rogers of Dowdeswell, Gloucestershire, Lysons had no issue. He left his fortune to Daniel Lysons (1762–1834), his nephew.

== Notes ==
Attribution

This article incorporates text from a publication now in the public domain: Lee, Sidney, ed. (1893). "Lysons, Daniel (1727-1800)". Dictionary of National Biography. Vol. 34. London: Smith, Elder & Co.
