= Vittorio =

- Pronunciation: Italian: [vitˈtɔːrjo]
- Gender: masculine
- Language: Italian

Origin
- Derivation: Latin victor
- Meaning: "winner", "conqueror"

Other names
- Variant form: Vittoria (female)
- Related names: Victor, Vittorino, Vittore

Vittorio is an Italian given name. It is derived from the Latin name Victor, meaning "winner" or "conqueror".

The feminine form of the name is Vittoria.

== Notable people with the name ==
- Vittorio Emanuele, Prince of Naples (1937–2024), pretender to the former Kingdom of Italy
- Vittorio Adorni (1937–2022), Italian road racing cyclist
- Vittorio Agnoletto (born 1958), European Parliament member
- Vittorio Alfieri (1749–1803), Italian dramatist and poet
- Vittorio Luigi Alfieri (1863–1918), Italian military officer
- Vittorio Algeri (born 1953), Italian cyclist and director
- Vittorio Alinari (1859–1932), Italian photographer
- Vittorio Allievi (born 1962), Italian gymnast
- Vittorio Amandola (1952–2010), Italian actor and voice actor
- Vittorio Ambrosini (1893–1971), Italian politician
- Vittorio Ambrosio (1879–1958), Italian general
- Vittorio Angelone (born 1996), Northern Irish stand-up comedian, actor and writer
- Vittorio Arminjon (1830–1897), Italian admiral
- Vittorio Arrigoni (1975–2011), Italian murdered journalist and peace activist
- Vittorio Avanzi (1850–1913), Italian painter
- Vittorio Avondo (1836–1910), Italian antiquarian and painter
- Vittorio Bachelet (1926–1980), Italian academic and politician
- Vittorio Badini Confalonieri (1914–1993), Italian politician and lawyer
- Vittorio Baldini (1575–1618), Italian printer and publisher
- Vittorio Ballio Morpurgo (1890–1966), Italian architect
- Vittorio Barazzotto (born 1958), Italian politician
- Vittorio Barzoni (1767–1843), Italian writer
- Vittorio Belmondo (1912–1962), Italian racing driver
- Vittorio Benussi (1878–1927), Austrian-Italian psychologist
- Vittorio Bernardo (born 1986), Italian football player
- Vittorio Bigari (1692–1776), Italian painter
- Vittorio Bissaro (born 1987), Italian competitive sailor
- Vittorio Blanseri, Italian painter
- Vittorio Bolaffio (1883–1931), Italian painter
- Vittorio Bolla (1932–2002), Italian ice hockey player
- Vittorio Bongiorno, Italian writer and musician
- Vittorio Bottego (1860–1897), Italian army officer and explorer
- Vittorio Brambilla (1937–2001), Italian Formula One racing driver
- Vittorio Emanuele Bressanin (1860–1941), Italian painter
- Vittorio Brumotti (born 1980), Italian television presenter
- Vittorio Calcina (1847–1916), Italian filmmaker
- Vittorio Calestani (1882–1949), Italian botanist
- Vittorio Camardese (1929–2010), Italian physician
- Vittorio Camerana (1855–1923), Italian general
- Vittorio Capellaro (1877–1943), Italian-Brazilian film director
- Vittorio Caprioli (1921–1989), Italian actor, director and screenwriter
- Vittorio Casaretti (born 1922), Italian footballer
- Vittorio Casarin (born 1950), Italian politician
- Vittorio Casatti (born 1938), Italian cyclist
- Vittorio Cassar, Maltese architect and military engineer
- Vittorio Stellin Castellani (1928–1969), Italian field hockey player
- Vittorio Castellano (1909–1997), Italian statistician
- Vittorio Catani (1940–2020), Italian writer
- Vittorio Cavalleri (1860–1938), Italian painter
- Vittorio Cavalotti (1893–1939), Italian cyclist
- Vittorio Cecchi Gori (born 1942), Italian film producer and politician
- Vittorio Chiarini (born 1937), Italian cyclist
- Vittorio Chierroni (1917–1986), Italian alpine skier
- Vittorio A. Ciani, Italian sculptor
- Vittorio Amedeo Cignaroli, Italian painter and architect
- Vittorio Cini (1885–1977), Italian industrialist and politician
- Vittorio Cioni (1900–1981), Italian rower
- Vittorio Coccia (1918–1982), Italian footballer
- Vittorio Coco (born 1939), Italian-Canadian journalist and politician
- Vittorio Colao (born 1961), Italian businessman
- Vittorio Colizzi (born 1949), Italian virologist
- Vittorio Colocci, Italian racing driver
- Vittorio Congia (1930–2019), Italian actor
- Vittorio Continella (born 2002), Italian footballer
- Vittorio Corbo (born 1943), Chilean bank governor
- Vittorio Matteo Corcos (1859–1933), Italian painter
- Vittorio Corona (1947–2007), Italian journalist
- Vittorio Cosma (born 1965), Italian composer and record producer
- Vittorio Cotesta, Italian social scientist
- Vittorio Cottafavi (1914–1998), Italian film director and screenwriter
- Vittorio Cristini (1928–1974), Italian footballer
- Vittorio Crivelli, Italian painter
- Vittorio Croizat, engineer inventor
- Vittorio Crosten, Italian carver
- Vittorio Crotta (born 1946), Italian tennis player
- Vittorio Cuniberti (1854–1913), Italian military officer and naval engineer
- Vittorio Curtoni (1949–2011), Italian writer
- Vittorio Dabormida (1842–1896), Italian general during Battle of Adwa
- Vittorio Dagianti (1919–1994), Italian footballer and coach
- Vittorio De Angelis (1962–2015), Italian voice actor
- Vittorio De Feo (1928–2002), Italian architect
- Vittorio De Marino (1863–1929), Italian priest and physician
- Vittorio De Seta (1923–2011), Italian director and screenwriter
- Vittorio De Sica (1901–1974), Italian director and actor
- Vittorio De Sisti (1940–2006), Italian film director and screenwriter
- Vittorio Di Prima (1941–2016), Italian voice actor
- Vittorio Duse (1916–2005), Italian actor, screenwriter and film director
- Vittorio Fabris (born 1993), Italian footballer
- Vittorio Emanuele Falsitta (born 1966), Italian politician and lawyer
- Vittorio Faroppa (1887–1958), Italian footballer
- Vittorio Feltri (born 1943), Italian journalist
- Vittorio Ferracini (born 1951), Italian basketball player
- Vittorio Paolo Fiorito (1941–2015), Italian basketball referee
- Vittorio Fiorucci (1932–2008), Italian-Canadian poster artist
- Vittorio Foa (1910–2008), Italian politician, trade unionist, journalist and writer
- Vittorio Folonari (1915–2010), Italian bobsledder
- Vittorio Fontanella (born 1953), Italian middle-distance runner
- Vittorio Fossombroni (1754–1844), Italian statesman, mathematician, economist and distinguished drainage engineer
- Vittorio Gallese, Italian physiologist
- Vittorio Gallinari (born 1958), Italian basketball player
- Vittorio Garatti (1927–2023), Italian architect
- Vittorio Gassman (1922–2000), Italian actor and director
- Vittorio Gelmetti (1926–1992), Italian composer
- Vittorio Giannini (1903–1966), American neoromantic composer
- Vittorio Giardino (born 1946), Italian comic artist
- Vittorio Giovanelli (1882–1966), Italian general
- Vittorio Gliubich (1902–1984), Italian rower
- Vittorio Gnecchi (1876–1954), Italian composer
- Vittorio Goretti (1939–2016), Italian astronomer
- Vittorio Gorresio (1910–1982), Italian writer and journalist
- Vittorio Gottardi (born 1967), Swiss footballer
- Vittorio Gregotti (1927–2020), Italian architect
- Vittorio Grigolo (born 1977), Italian operatic tenor
- Vittorio Grilli (born 1957), Italian economist and academic
- Vittorio Grünwald (1855–1943), Italian mathematician
- Vittorio Guerrieri (born 1958), Italian voice actor
- Vittorio Gui (1885–1975), Italian conductor, composer and musicologist
- Vittorio Guidano (1944–1999), Italian neuropsychiatrist
- Vittorio Hösle (born 1960), German philosopher
- Vittorio Iannuzzo (born 1982), Italian motorcycle racer
- Vittorio Jano (1891–1965), Italian engineer and car designer
- Vittorio Lastra (born 1996), Chilean rugby union player
- Vittorio Lattanzio (1926–2010), Italian politician
- Vittorio Lavezzari (1864–1938), Italian sculptor
- Vittorio Leonardi (born 1977), South African comedian and actor
- Vittorio Leonardo (born 1938), Italian colorist
- Vittorio Lingiardi (born 1960), Italian psychiatrist and psychoanalyst
- Vittorio Loi (1942–2015), Italian Paralympic wheelchair fencer
- Vittorio Lucarelli (1928–2008), Italian fencer
- Vittorio Lucchetti (1894–1965), Italian artistic gymnast
- Vittorio Maggioni (1930–2017), Italian middle-distance runner
- Vittorio Magnago Lampugnani (born 1951), Italian architect and academic
- Vittorio Magnelli (born 1957), Italian tennis player
- Vittorio Magni (1918–2010), Italian cyclist
- Vittorio Magni (footballer) (born 2006), Italian footballer
- Vittorio Malingri (born 1961), italian boat designer
- Vittorio Mancini, multiple people
- Vittorio Mangano (1940–2000), Italian mob boss
- Vittorio Maragliano, 19th-century Italian pioneer
- Vittorio Marcelli (born 1944), Italian cyclist
- Vittorio Marchi (1851–1908), Italian histologist
- Vittorio de Marco (1899–1988), Italian classical scholar
- Vittorio Mariani (1859–1946), Italian architect
- Vittorio Marzotto (1922–1999), Italian racing driver
- Vittorio Mathieu (1923–2020), Italian philosopher
- Vittorio Meano (1860–1904), Italian architect
- Vittorio Menzinger, Italian politician
- Vittorio Merloni (1933–2016), Italian businessman
- Vittorio Mero (1974–2002), Italian footballer
- Vittorio Messori (1941–2026), Italian journalist and writer
- Vittorio Metz (1904–1984), Italian screenwriter and film director
- Vittorio Mezzogiorno (1941–1994), Italian actor
- Vittorio Mibelli (1860–1910), Italian dermatologist
- Vittorio Micolucci (born 1983), Italian footballer
- Vittorio Miele (1926–1999), Italian painter
- Vittorio Missoni (1954–2013), Italian fashion designer and businessman
- Vittorio Moccagatta (1903–1941), Italian soldier
- Vittorio Monti (1868–1922), Italian composer, violinist and conductor
- Vittorio Morelli di Popolo (1888–1963), Italian footballer
- Vittorio Moroni, Italian director and screenwriter
- Vittorio Mussolini (1916–1997), Italian film critic and producer
- Vittorio Negri (1923–1998), Italian conductor, record producer and musicologist
- Vittorio Nino Novarese (1907–1983), Italian costume designer, writer and art director
- Vittorio Orlandi (born 1938), Italian equestrian
- Vittorio Emanuele Orlando (1860–1952), Italian politician
- Vittorio Orsenigo (1926–2025), Italian writer and director
- Vittorio Parigini (born 1996), Italian footballer
- Vittorio Parisi (born 1957), Italian conductor and teacher
- Vittorio Parrinello (born 1983), Italian boxer
- Vittorio Pellandra (born 1941), Sammarinese tennis player
- Vittorio Pezzutto (born 1966), Italian journalist, writer and politician
- Vittorio Pini (1859–1903), Italian anarchist
- Vittorio Piscopo (1913–2004), Italian painter and scenographer
- Vittorio Podestà (born 1973), Italian Paralympic cyclist
- Vittorio Pomilio (1933–2025), Italian basketball player
- Vittorio Pozzo (1886–1968), Italian football player and coach
- Vittorio Prodi (1937–2023), Italian politician
- Vittorio Pusceddu (born 1964), Italian footballer
- Vittorio Reggiani, Italian painter
- Vittorio Riccio (1621–1685), Italian Dominican missionary
- Vittorio Rieti (1898–1994), Italian and American composer
- Vittorio Roberto (born 1997), Sri Lankan cricketer
- Vittorio Roscio (born 1943), Italian sprinter
- Vittorio Rossi (born 1961), Canadian screenwriter
- Vittorio Rossi (philologist) (1865–1938), Italian philologist
- Vittorio G. Rossi, Italian journalist and writer
- Vittorio Rossi Pianelli (1875–1953), Italian film director
- Vittorio Rovelli (1916–1996), Italian footballer
- Vittorio Russo (born 1939), Italian footballer and manager
- Vittorio Sala (1918–1996), Italian screenwriter
- Vittorio Sanipoli (1915–1992), Italian actor
- Vittorio Sardelli (1918–2000), Italian footballer
- Vittorio Scantamburlo (1930–2016), Italian football scout
- Vittorio Scarpati, Italian artist and cartoonist
- Vittorio Scatola (born 1959), Italian motorcycle racer
- Vittorio Scialoja (1856–1933), Italian jurist and politician
- Vittorio Sega (1935–2022), Italian politician
- Vittorio Seghezzi (1924–2019), Italian racing cyclist
- Vittorio Sella (1859–1943), Italian photographer and mountaineer
- Vittorio Sentimenti (1918–2004), Italian football player
- Vittorio Sereni (1913–1983), Italian poet, author, editor and translator
- Vittorio Sgarbi (born 1952), Italian art critic and politician
- Vittorio Simonelli (1860–1929), Italian geologist and paleontologist
- Vittorio Sindoni (born 1939), Italian director and screenwriter
- Vittorio Sodano (born 1974), Italian make-up artist
- Vittorio Sogno (1885–1971), Italian general
- Vittorio Staccione (1904–1945), Italian footballer
- Vittorio Stagni (born 1937), Italian actor and voice actor
- Vittorio Francesco Stancari (1678–1709), professor of mathematics
- Vittorio Storaro (born 1940), Italian cinematographer
- Vittorio Claudio Surdo (born 1943), Italian diplomat
- Vittorio Tamagnini (1910–1981), Italian boxer
- Vittorio Emanuele Taparelli d'Azeglio (1816–1890), Italian diplomat and politician
- Vittorio Taviani (1929–2018), Italian director and screenwriter
- Vittorio Tomassetti (1930–2008), Italian bishop
- Vittorio Torcellan (born 1962), Italian rower
- Vittorio Torre (died 1921), Italian chess player
- Vittorio Tosto (born 1974), Italian footballer
- Vittorio Tracuzzi (1923–1986), Italian basketball player and coach
- Vittorio Trento, Italian composer
- Vittorio Triarico (born 1989), Italian footballer
- Vittorio Tur (1882–1969), Italian admiral
- Vittorio Valentinis, Italian rower
- Vittorio Valletta (1883–1967), Italian industrialist and president
- Vittorio Vaser (1904–1963), Italian stage and film actor
- Vittorio Vettori (1920–2004), Italian poet
- Vittorio Vidali (1900–1983), Italian politician
- Vittorio Vidotto (1941–2024), Italian historian
- Vittorio Villano (born 1988), Belgian footballer
- Vittorio Francesco Viola (born 1965), Italian Catholic prelate
- Vittorio Visini (born 1945), Italian racewalker
- Vittorio Zoboli (born 1968), Italian racing driver
- Vittorio Zonca (1568–1603), Italian engineer and writer
- Vittorio Zucca (1895–1943), Italian sprinter
- Vittorio Zucconi (1944–2019), Italian journalist and author
- Vittorio Italico Zupelli (1859–1945), Italian general and politician

=== Fictional Characters ===
- Vittorio Antonio "Vito" Scaletta, from Mafia
- Vittorio Toscano, from Dead by Daylight
- Vittorio Veneto, from Azur Lane

== See also ==
- Victor (name)
- Vittore
- Vittorino
- Vittoria
