= Bongiorno =

People with the surname Bongiorno include:

- Annette Bongiorno, see Participants in the Madoff investment scandal
- Bernard Bongiorno, Australian professor and former Court of Appeal justice
- Carmelo Bongiorno (born 1960), Italian photographer
- Francesco Manuel Bongiorno (born 1990), Italian racing cyclist
- Frank Bongiorno (born 1969), Australian historian, academic and author
- Giulia Bongiorno (born 1966) is an Italian lawyer and politician
- Guillermo Bongiorno (born 1978), Argentine former professional cyclist
- Leigh Bongiorno (born 1987), an American figurative artist
- María José Bongiorno, Argentine politician
- Marylou and Jerome Bongiorno, American filmmakers
- Mike Bongiorno (1924–2009), Italian television presenter
- Paul Bongiorno (born 1944), Australian political journalist and commentator
- Vito Bongiorno (born 1963), Italian artist
- Vittorio Bongiorno (born 1973), Italian writer and musician
- Frank Bongiorno Born 1959 Connecticut Businessman
