= Vittorino =

- Gender: masculine
- Language: Italian

Origin
- Derivation: Latin victor
- Meaning: "winner", "conqueror"

Other names
- Related names: Victor, Vittorio, Vittore

Vittorino is an Italian given name which is derived from the Latin name Victor, meaning "winner" or "conqueror". Notable people with the name include:

- Vittorino Colombo (1925–1996), Italian politician
- Vittorino da Feltre (1378–1446), Italian humanist and teacher
- Vittorino Mansi (died 1611), Roman Catholic prelate and bishop
- Vittorino Milanesio (born 1953), Italian sprinter
- Vittorino Veronese (1910–1986), Italian lawyer and activist

== See also ==
- San Vittorino, Cittaducale, Baroque former Roman Catholic church in Italy
- San Vittorino, village in the Abruzzo region of central Italy
- Vittorio, Italian given name
