= Giuseppe Perugini =

Italian architect

- Born: 17 March 1914; Buenos Aires, Argentina
- Died: 19 September 1995 (aged 81); Rome, Italy
- Education: Sapienza University of Rome
- Occupations: Architect, urban planner

Giuseppe Perugini (17 March 1914 – 19 September 1995) was an Argentine-Italian architect and urban planner.

== Life and career ==
Born in Buenos Aires, Argentina, Perugini moved to Rome in the early 1930s. He graduated in architecture from Sapienza University in 1941, where he studied under prominent figures such as Adalberto Libera, and soon after began teaching architectural composition at the same institution.

Following World War II, he contributed to national postwar reconstruction efforts, participating in several government commissions, including those for earthquake recovery in the Belice region, school building regulations, and urban planning for the Rome metropolitan area.

A founding member of the Association for Organic Architecture, Perugini served as president of the Rome and Lazio Architects' Association and of the Opera Universitaria from 1962 to 1966.

His personal archive is housed at the MAXXI Museum in Rome.

== Works (selection) ==
=== Buildings ===
- Fosse Ardeatine memorial, Rome (1944–46, with Nello Aprile and Mario Fiorentino)
- API gas station, EUR, Rome (1949)
- Italian pavilion at Expo 58, Brussels (1956–59, with Ignazio Gardella, Ludovico Quaroni, Adolfo De Carlo)
- Church in Piedimonte San Germano (1956–66)
- INA-Casa buildings, Acilia, Rome (1956–59)
- Rome Courthouse (Città Giudiziaria) in Piazzale Clodio (with Nicola Monteduro, 1958)
- Tre Fontane housing development, Rome (1963)
- Experimental house in Fregene (1968–1970)
- New Modern Art Gallery, Milan (1970)
- Florence Business District (1975)
- Consorzio Edilizio "Filippo Turati" buildings, Laurentino, Rome (1976–81)
- New Town Hall, Celano (1988–89)
- Natalino Sapegno memorial, Aosta (1991)

=== Urban planning ===
- Valle della Caffarella, Rome
- Macerata reconstruction plan
- Castel Madama master plan
- Ciampino master plan
- Racalmuto master plan

== Sources ==
- Giuseppe Perugini. Progetti e Ricerca. Rome: Nuova Dimensione. 1975.
- Ippolito, Achille Maria; Pagnotta, Mauro (1982). Roma costruita. Le vicende, le problematiche e le realizzazioni dell'architettura a Roma dal 1946 al 1981. Rome: Palombi. pp. 61, 100, 148.
- Guccione, Margherita (2017). MAXXI Architettura. Catalogo delle Collezioni. Macerata: Quodlibet. p. 127.
- Rossi, Pietro Ostilio (2000). Roma. Guida all'architettura moderna 1909-2000. Bari: Laterza. pp. 78, 92, 149.
