= Vittore =

- Pronunciation: Italian: [vitˈto.re]
- Gender: masculine
- Language: Italian

Origin
- Derivation: Latin victor
- Meaning: "winner", "conqueror"

Other names
- Related names: Victor, Vittorio, Vittorino

Vittore is an Italian given name, derived from the Latin name Victor, meaning "winner" or "conqueror".

== Notable people with the name ==
- Vittore Baroni (born 1956), Italian mail artist
- Vittore Belliniano (1456–1529), Italian painter
- Vittore Benedetto Antonio Trevisan de Saint-Léon (1818–1897), Italian botanist
- Vittore Bocchetta (1918–2021), Italian sculptor, painter, and academic
- Vittore Branca (1913–2004), Italian philologist, literary critic, and academic
- Vittore Capello (1588–1648), Roman Catholic prelate
- Vittore Carpaccio (c. 1460/65 – c. 1525), Italian painter
- Vittore de Franceschi, Roman Catholic prelate
- Vittore Gambello (1460–1537), Italian sculptor and medallis
- Vittore Ghiliani (1812–1878), Italian entomologist
- Vittore Gottardi (1941–2015), Swiss footballer
- Vittore Grubicy de Dragon (1851–1920), Italian painter, art critic and art gallery owner
- Vittore Martini (1912–1993), Italian footballer
- Vittore Soranzo (1500–1558), Italian bishop
- Vittore Stocchi (1895–1967), Italian rower
- Vittore Trincavelli (1496–1568), Italian physician
- Vittore Ugo Righi (1910–1980), Italian Catholic prelate
- Vittore Zanetti Zilla (1864–1946), Italian painter

== See also ==
- 2235 Vittore, minor planet
- San Vittore (disambiguation)
