= Gabriele Manfredi =

Italian mathematician (1681–1761)

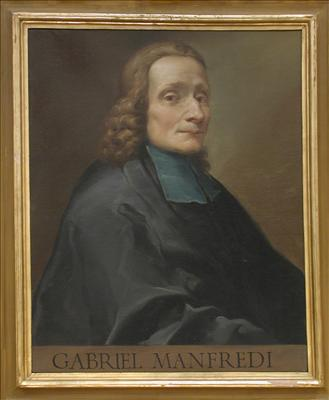
- Born: 25 March 1681; Bologna, Papal States
- Died: 13 October 1761 (aged 80); Bologna, Papal States
- Resting place: Santa Maria Maddalena, Bologna
- Occupation: Mathematician
- Employer: University of Bologna
- Known for: Theory of first-order differential equations

Academic background
- Education: University of Bologna

Academic work
- Notable students: Francesco Maria Zanotti

Notes
- He is the brother of Eustachio Manfredi.

Gabriele Manfredi (25 March 1681 – 13 October 1761) was an Italian mathematician who worked in the field of calculus.

== Early years ==
Gabriele Manfredi was born in Bologna, then in the Papal States, on 25 March 1681. He was the son of Alfonso Manfredi, a notary from Lugo, Emilia-Romagna, and Anna Maria Fiorini. His elder brother Eustachio studied law, then turned to science. Gabriele and his brother Eraclito studied medicine, while his fourth brother Emilio became a Jesuit preacher. His two sisters Maddalena and Teresa were also well educated, and later collaborated with their brothers in their work. Gabriele became uncomfortable with the study of anatomy, and turned to other subjects before he and Eustachio were introduced to the new subject of differential calculus by the physicist Domenico Guglielmini.

== Mathematician ==
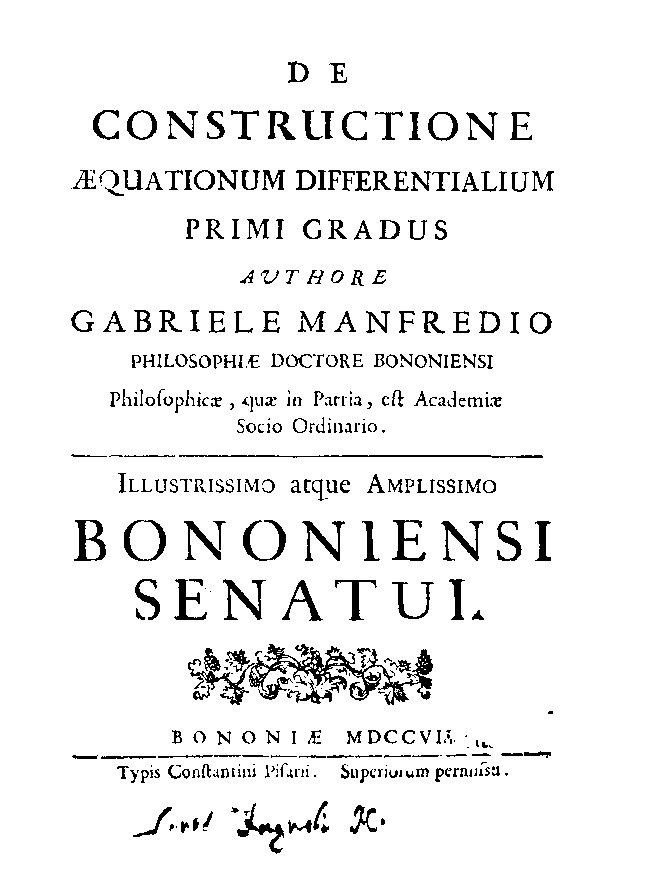
De constructione aequationum differentialium primi gradus, 1707

Manfredi was one of a group of young men at the University who became interested in the techniques of Cartesian geometry and differential calculus, and who engaged in experiments and astronomical observation. Others were his brother Eustachio, Vittorio Francesco Stancari and Giuseppe Verzaglia. Of these, Gabriele Manfredi developed the most advanced understanding of mathematics. Eustachio Manfredi became more interested in astronomy, but Gabriele persisted with mathematics, studying the works of Leibniz and of Johann and Jacob Bernoulli on infinitesimal calculus.

After graduating, Gabriele went to Rome at the end of 1702, where he became librarian to Cardinal Pietro Ottoboni, a historian, antiquarian and astronomer. He helped Ottoboni build a sundial at Santa Maria degli Angeli e dei Martiri and helped in the work of reforming the Gregorian calendar. He continued to study mathematics, including differential and integral calculus and logarithmic curves. In 1707, he returned to Bologna, where he published his best-known work on first-order differential equations. This was the first European work on differential equations. The book, praised by Leibniz and Johann Bernoulli and favourably reviewed by the Acta Eruditorum, quickly gained a great reputation throughout Europe. It was regarded as the equivalent in the subject of the integral calculus to Guillaume de l'Hôpital’s Analyse des infiniment petits pour l'intelligence des lignes courbes (1696) in the subject of the differential calculus. Despite this, Manfredi was not given a senior position in the university. He made further contributions to the theory of calculus, although his main contribution after 1715 was as a teacher.

== Later career ==
In 1708, Manfredi began working for the Chancellery of the Senate of Bologna, where he rose to the rank of first chancellor and remained until he retired in 1752. From 1720, he also taught at the University of Bologna. In 1742, he was made superintendent of water, replacing his brother Eustachio. This job, concerned with improving river navigation while avoiding flooding, proved to be difficult and politically controversial.

Manfredi married Teresa Del Sole, from the family of the painter Giovanni Gioseffo, and they had three children. He died in Bologna on 5 October 1761 at the age of 80, and was buried in the church of Santa Maria Maddalena, Bologna. The asteroid 13225 Manfredi was named in honour of him and his two brothers, Eustachio and Eraclito.

== Work ==
In his work De constructionae aequationum differentialium primi gradu (1707), Manfredi set forth the results he had obtained so far in solving problems related to differential equations and the foundations of calculus. His paper Breve schediasma geometrico per la costruzione di una gran parte delle equazioni differenziali di primo grado (1714) described the procedure commonly adopted for integrating first-order homogeneous differential equations.

== List of works ==
- Manfredi, Gabriello (1707). De constructione aequationum differentialium primi gradus (in Latin). Bononiae: typis Constantini Pisarii.
- Manfredi, Gabriello. Voto del sig. dottore Gabriello Manfredi pubblico professore di matematica nella Universita di Bologna sopra il parere de' due periti di Bologna e di Ravenna circa l'arginare il Po di Primaro da essi steso dopo la visita dello stesso Po fatta nel 1758. d'ordine della san. me. di Benedetto 14. [Bologna].
