= Rome Courthouse =

Judiciary complex in Rome, Italy

- Interactive map of the Rome Courthouse area

General information
- Location: Piazzale Clodio; Rome, Italy
- Coordinates: 41°54′59.5″N 12°27′05.4″E
- Construction started: 1958
- Completed: 1969

Design and construction
- Architects: Nicola Monteduro, Giuseppe Perugini

The Rome Courthouse (Uffici giudiziari, or Città giudiziaria) is located on Piazzale Clodio in Rome, Italy. The architectural complex, originally composed of three buildings and later expanded with a fourth, houses the Court of Rome, including the civil court, the criminal court, the public prosecutor's office, and the Court of Appeal.

== History ==
In 1957, the Municipality of Rome launched a design competition for the construction of a new judicial complex in the Piazzale Clodio area, intended to house the city's main judicial offices. The winning project was the result of a merger between two proposals that had tied for first place, led respectively by architects Giuseppe Perugini and Nicola Monteduro.

Construction began in 1961 but was quickly halted due to issues related to the building's foundations. Work resumed in 1963 and was completed in 1969. The overall design also involved numerous collaborators, including Fabrizio Bruno, Vittorio De Feo, Uga de Plaisant, Elio Giangreco, Franco Girardi, Manfredi Nicoletti, and Piero Reggiani.

Between 1988 and 1990, a new building for the Court of Appeal was constructed at the beginning of Via Antonio Varisco. The building, with a volume of approximately 20,000 cubic meters over five floors, includes six courtrooms, as well as office spaces and the offices of the Court's Presidency.

== Description ==
The complex consists of three main buildings, each between five and six stories tall, arranged around a two-level elevated platform designed to manage vehicular and pedestrian circulation. This platform acts both as a distribution hub and as a transitional space between the city and the judicial complex.

The façades are defined by cast concrete panels, shaped using metal formwork and later bush-hammered to achieve a textured finish. A distinctive feature of the design is the window system: a tripartite layout with a central section projecting 1.20 meters outward. This solution, supported by a mixed steel and anodized aluminum frame, was developed to ensure the privacy of judicial functions, given the proximity to surrounding residential buildings.

The internal layout follows a triple-bay scheme: two lateral wings for offices and a central corridor paved in porphyry cubes, resembling an internal street. The horizontal structures, with a thickness of 60 cm, feature flat ceilings that allow for high spatial flexibility in the layout of interior spaces.

== Sources ==
- Giuseppe Perugini. Progetti e Ricerca. Rome: Nuova Dimensione. 1975. pp. 47–62.
- Conforti, Claudia; Dal Co, Francesco (1986). Vittorio De Feo. Opere e progetti. Milan: Electa. pp. 53–55.
- Giorgio Muratore; Alessandra Capuano; Francesco Garofalo; Ettore Pellegrini, eds. (1988). Italia. Gli ultimi trent'anni. Bologna: Zanichelli. p. 331.
- Palma, Bruno (1968). "La città giudiziaria". Capitolium. No. 5. pp. 183–197.
- Rossi, Piero Ostilio (2000). Roma. Guida all'architettura moderna 1909-2000. Rome-Bari: Laterza.
- Sanfilippo, Mario (1994). La costruzione di una capitale. Roma 1945-1991. Vol. 3. Cinisello Balsamo: Silvana Editoriale. pp. 169–171.
