= Claudio Francesco Beaumont =

Italian painter (1694–1766)

Claudio Francesco Beaumont (4 July 1694 – 21 June 1766) was an Italian painter, active in a late baroque-style mostly in the Piedmont region.

== Life ==
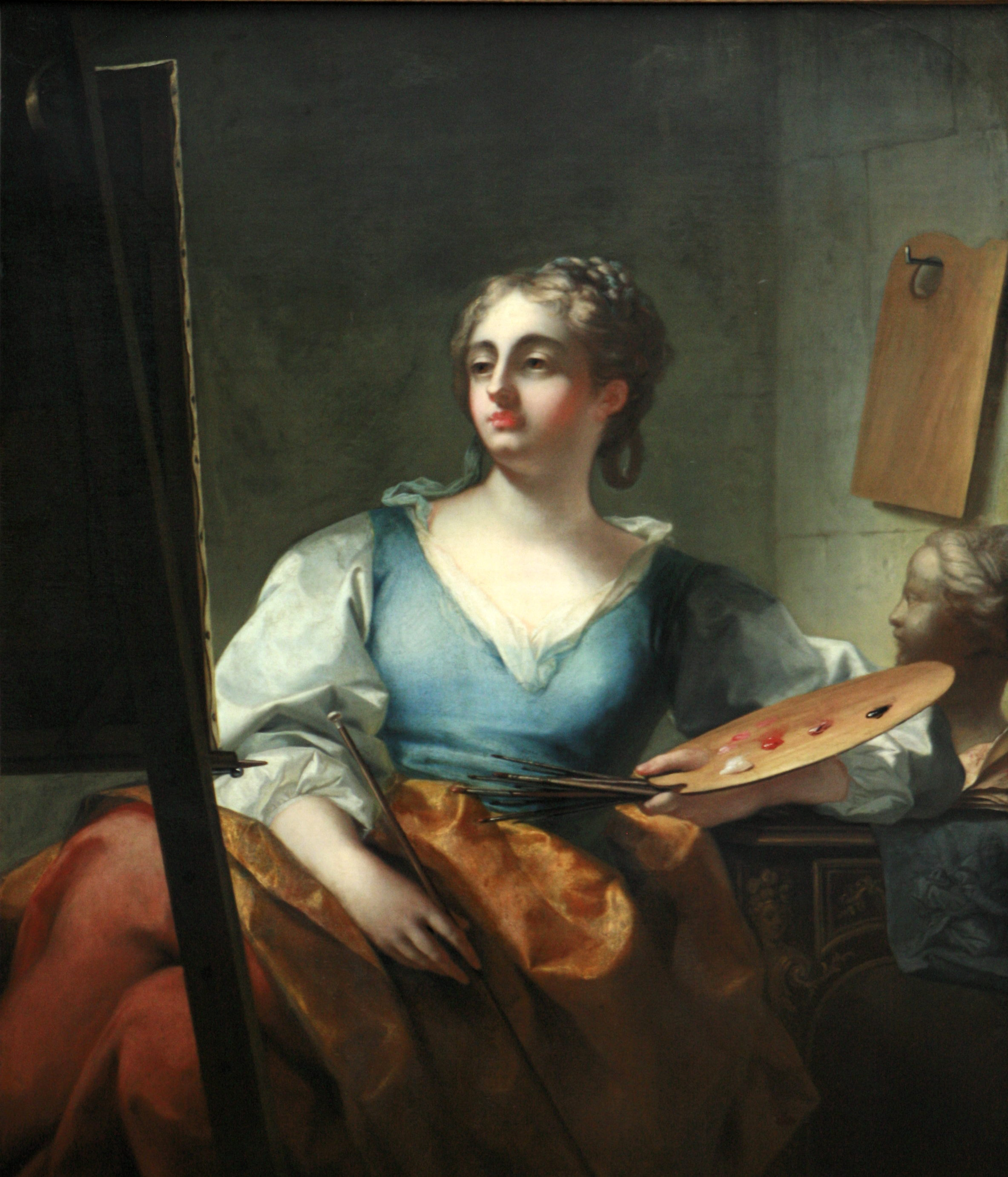
Beaumont's Allegory of Painting, at the Musée des Beaux-Arts de Brest.

Beumont was born in Turin, and little is known of his early youth, besides that he was educated in grammar, rhetoric, architecture and mathematics in a Jesuit school. There is documentation of travel to Bologna, where he stayed from February to December 1716, and where he was likely influenced by the school of late seventeenth-century painter Carlo Cignani. In December of the same year he was in Rome, and a letter addressed to his brother documented that he was at the school of Francesco Trevisani, who would have a great influence on him. In Rome, he is said to have copied the works of Raphael, the Carracci, and Guido Reni, but showed little respect for the Roman painters of his own time, except for Trevisani, whose manner he imitated in the vigor of his tints. The reports of the ministers in Rome to the king of Sardinia proved that he enjoyed, even in that city, the protection of the sovereign. In the interval between the return to Turin in 1719 and his second Roman stay in 1723, Beaumont completed the decoration of an Aurora fresco on a ceiling of the second floor room in the Turin Royal Palace. In 1724 the king of Sardinia recommended him to Wleughels, director of the French Academy in Rome, who was passing through. In 1725 he was admitted to the Accademia di San Luca in Rome. In 1727 he received a grant of 2000 lire per year from the Savoy Monarchy, first step for the nomination as court painter, which took place in 1731. In 1727 a serious illness obliged him to pause in his artistic work, but he continued to be supported by the Piedmontese monarchy. This year Elena (now lost) was documented for the castle of Rivoli. The repertoire of Beaumont was formed in these years, taking advantage of the iconography that was dear to Trevisani, as is recognized by the subjects of Sofonisba executed according to the style of Maratta (first sent from Rome in 1729, in Palazzo Madama, Turin, up to 1800, and then in private collection).

In 1730 the King attempted to recall the painter to Turin, to help in a number of decorative projects. But Beaumont stayed in Rome to complete a Blessed Margaret and a San Carlo Borromeo Meets Plague Victims destined for the church of Superga. Together with a Deposition for Santa Croce in Turin, the paintings for Superga recall the style of Maratta that was prevailing in the Roman and Neapolitan churches, with references to Giacinto Brandi, Sebastiano Conca and Trevisani. In July 1731 Beaumont was appointed a court painter. In 1736 the painter was made knight or Cavaliere of the Order of Saints Maurice and Lazarus. On 22 March 1737 the painter was sent to Venice to negotiate the purchase of paintings and here he made contact, most likely, with painters already active in the decoration of the Palazzo Reale, like Sebastiano Ricci and Giambattista Pittoni, who would influence the subsequent development of his style.

His fervent activity for Piedmontese castles included painting a San Giovanni Battista (1724-1725) and San Pietro for the Castello di Rivoli. Beaumont also painted for the churches of Piedmont, including the altarpiece representing the Blessed Chantal and Saint Francis de Sales (1740) for the monastery of the Visitation of Pinerolo. In 1755 Beaumont began his Blessed Amedeo, the main altarpiece installed in 1769 in the church of the Carmine of Turin. Beaumont died at the age of 72 and is buried in the church of Santa Teresa on 22 June 1766.

Among his pupils were Vittorio Blanseri and Giovanni Molinari.
