= Antonio Mosca =

Italian painter (1870–1951)

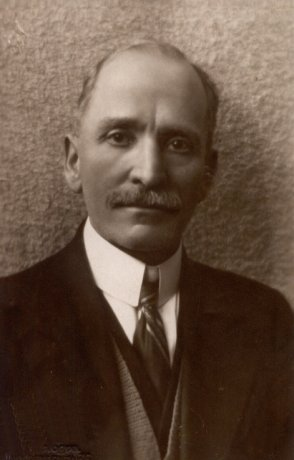
- Born: Antonio Mosca; 27 May 1870; Pieve di Cento, Bologna, Italy
- Died: 29 May 1951 (aged 81); Bologna, Italy
- Known for: Paintings
- Movement: Figurative art

Antonio Mosca (27 May 1870 – 29 May 1951) was an Italian painter.

== Biography ==
Mosca was born in Pieve di Cento, and died in Bologna. Born to a humble family, he obtained a stipend from the Pious Legacy or Endowment by the Melloni family to attend the Academy of Fine Arts of Bologna during 1894 to 1896. He refined his ability to paint portraits. By 1900, Antonio had moved to Bologna, and established friendships with Francesco Fabbri and Cesare Mauro Trebbi, with whom he would collaborate in the decoration of the cupola of the church of Church of San Pietro in Castello d'Argile. In 1905, he was employed in collaboration with Domenico Ferri, in the decoration of the cupola and apse of the church of Santa Maria Magdalena in Bologna. He pursued this work in a number of churches in Northeast Italy, including the parish church of Tuenno in Trentino-Alto Adige and in the Chapel of the Immaculate Conception in Borgo Valsugana, Trento. He wrote a treatise on perspective awarded at prizes in Milan, Paris, and Bologna in 1913. In 1912-1913 he painted a portrait of King Nikola I of Montenegro. Pieve di Cento in 1924 commissioned him to decorate the public clock in the Palazzo Comunale.
