= Eustachio Manfredi =

Italian mathematician, astronomer and poet (1674–1739)

Eustachio Manfredi FRS
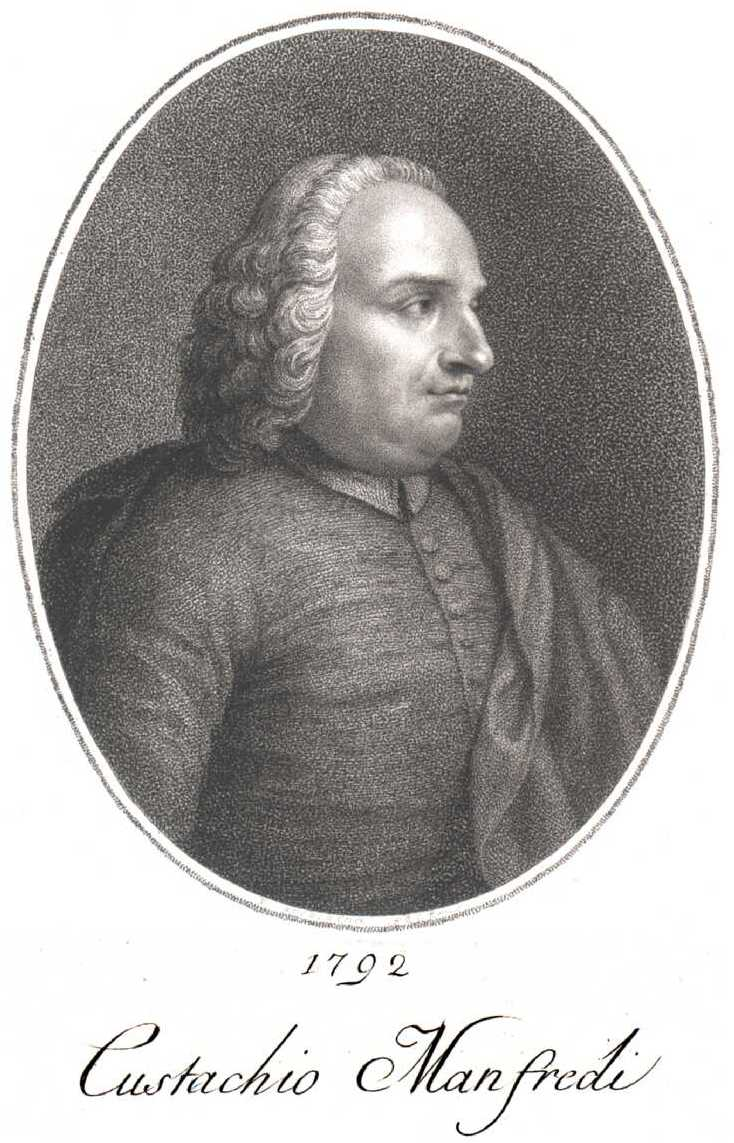
- Eustachio Manfredi in an engraving dated 1792 by Francesco Rosaspina
- Born: 20 September 1674; Bologna, Papal States
- Died: 15 February 1739 (aged 64); Bologna, Papal States
- Occupations: Mathematician astronomer poet
- Known for: Aberration of light
- Parent(s): Alfonso Manfredi and Anna Maria Manfredi (née Fiorini)

Academic background
- Education: University of Bologna

Academic work
- Discipline: Astronomy, Mathematics
- Institutions: University of Bologna

Notes
- He is the brother of Gabriele Manfredi.

Eustachio Manfredi FRS (20 September 1674 – 15 February 1739) was an Italian mathematician, astronomer and poet. Manfredi discovered, ten years earlier than James Bradley, the phenomenon of aberration.

== Biography ==
Eustachio Manfredi was born in Bologna on 20 September 1674. He attended Jesuit school, then studied at the University of Bologna, graduating with a degree in law in 1691. At the same time, he devoted himself to scientific studies in mathematics and astronomy, and to literature.

Manfredi founded the Accademia degli Inquieti (Academy of Restless) in Bologna around 1690 as a place where scientific topics could be discussed. At first, the academy held its meetings in Manfredi's house. After four years, it moved to Jacopo Sandri's house, which had more space, and in 1705 moved again to the palazzo of Conte Luigi Ferdinando Marsigli. The Accademia delle Scienze dell'Istituto di Bologna was formally inaugurated in 1714, and the Accademia degli Inquieti merged into it.

In 1698, Manfredi obtained the chair of mathematics at the University of Bologna. In 1704, he was named "Superintendent of the waters of Bologna", and was also made head of the college of Montalto, which educated young men destined for a clerical career. In 1711, he became director of the Astronomical Observatory of Bologna, a position he held until his death. He was a member of the French Academy of Sciences in Paris from 1726 and of the Royal Society of London from 1729. He died in Bologna on 15 February 1739.

== Scientific work ==
Manfredi's scientific work was impressive. On 29 November 1707 Manfredi and Vittorio Francesco Stancari discovered the comet C/1707 W1. Among his scientific works are Ephemerides motuum coelestium (1715–1725), which he completed with the help of his sisters Maddalena and Teresa; De transitu Mercurii per solem anno 1723 (1724), De gnomone meridiano bononiensi (1736) and Instituzioni astronomiche (1749), a posthumous work.

The asteroid 13225 Manfredi was named in honour of Eustachio Manfredi and his two brothers Gabriele Manfredi and Eraclito Manfredi. In 1719 Manfredi discovered, ten years earlier than James Bradley, the phenomenon of aberration. "The phenomenon is still known as the annual aberration of fixed stars, the name Manfredi gave it in the title of De annuis inerrantium stellarum aberrationibus (1729)."

The discovery provided "the first demonstration, though unsought, of the revolution of the Earth around the Sun, and thus the reality of a heliocentric system". As a result of this discovery, the Church admitted the scientific nature of the Copernican system and removed from the index many works of Galileo Galilei.

== Literary work ==
Manfredi was also a well-known poet in his day. He was a member of the Academy of Arcadia with the name of "Aci Delpusiano". The Rime of Manfredi was issued in 1713 and then published in the final edition posthumously in 1748 by his friend Giampietro Zanotti. It is generally about events of the period (births, marriages, deaths, etc.), according to the peculiar character of the Arcadian poetry, and is often weighed down by emphasis and intellectualism. His poetic vein shows itself in a group of poems called "for a nun," inspired by the closure of the convent of Giulia Caterina Vandi, a girl of Bologna with whom Manfredi had fallen in love. This group includes the song "Woman, they are your eyes", considered his masterpiece, and numerous sonnets in the style of Petrarch.

== Works ==
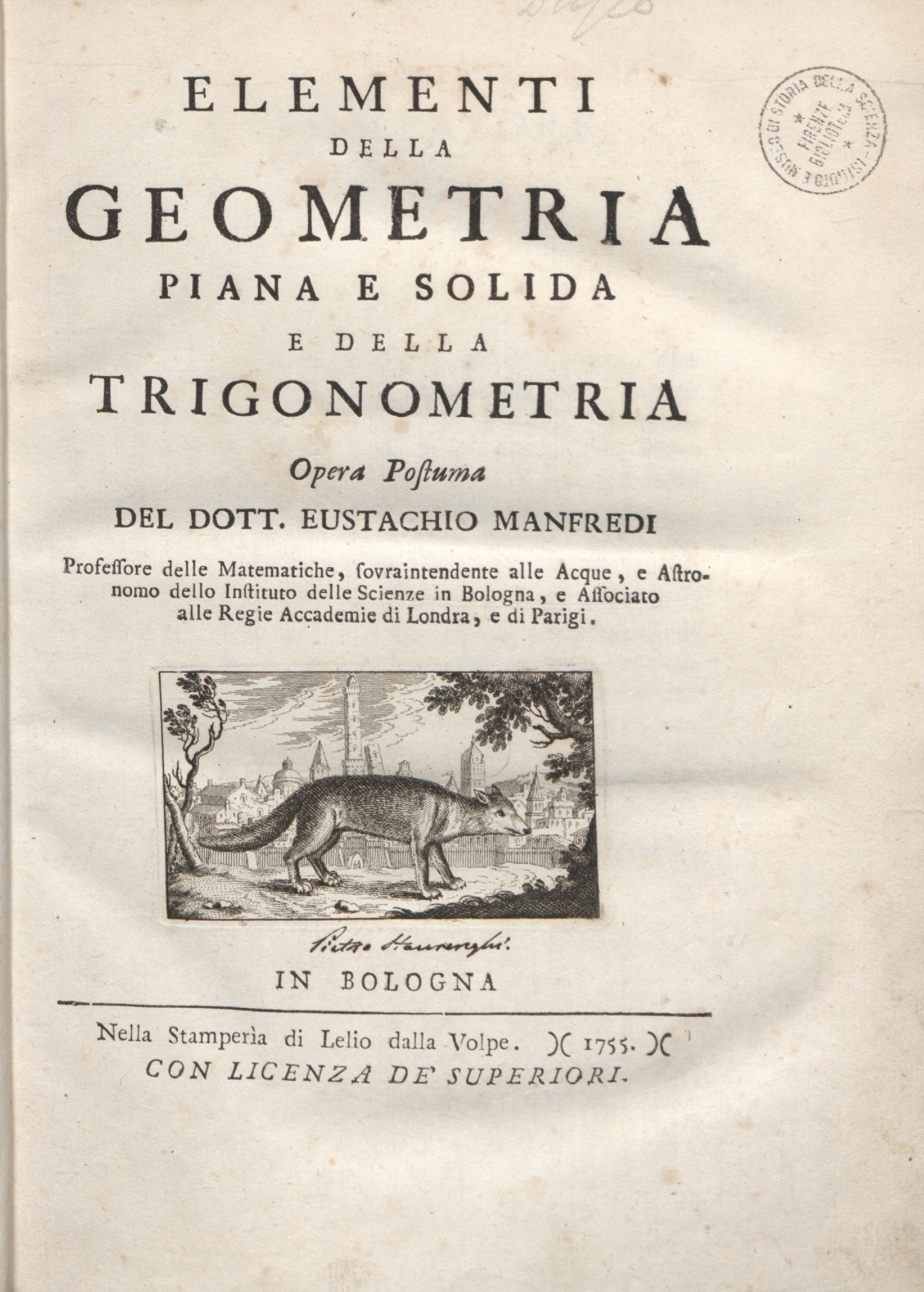
Elementi della geometria piana e solida e della trigonometria, 1755

- Epistola ad virum clarissimum Dominicum Quartaironium qua anonymi assertiones 16. pro reformatione calendarii ab illo impugnatae vindicantur (in Latin). Venezia: Antonio Bortoli. 1705.
- Manfredi, Eustachio (1715). Ephemerides Motuum Coelestium ex Anno 1715 – 25 (in Latin).
- Manfredi, Eustachio (1717). Replica de' bolognesi ad alcune considerazioni de' sig.ri ferraresi nella materia delle acque (in Italian). S. l.: sn.
- Manfredi, Eustachio (1717). Sopra le pretese variazioni seguite nel Reno e nel Panaro e nel Po' dopo l'anno 1693 (in Italian). S. l.: Conti Roma?.
- Manfredi, Eustachio (1718). Compendio et esame del libro pubblicato in Modena col titolo Effetti dannosi che produrrà il Reno se sia messo in Po' di Lombardia (in Italian). In Roma: Stamperia Camerale Roma.
- Manfredi, Eustachio (1724). Mercurii ac Solis congressus in astronomica specula Bononiensis Scientiarum Instituti observatus die 9. novembris 1723 (in Latin).
- Manfredi, Eustachio (1724). De transitu Mercurii per solem anno 1723. Bologna.
- Manfredi, Eustachio (1729). De annuis inerrantium stellarum aberrationibus (in Latin). Bononiae: Costantino Pisarri.
- Manfredi, Eustachio (1735). Compendiosa informazione di fatto sopra i confini della comunità ferrarese d'Ariano con lo stato veneto 1735 (in Italian). S.l.: sn.
- Manfredi, Eustachio (1736). De gnomone meridiano Bononiensi ad divi Petronii deque observationibus astronomicis eo instrumento ab ejus constructione ad hoc tempus peractis (in Latin). Bononiae: Lelio dalla Volpe.
- Guglielmini, Domenico; Manfredi, Eustachio (1739). Della natura de' fiumi – Nuova edizione con le annotazioni di Eustachio Manfredi (in Italian). Bologna: Lelio dalla Volpe.
- Manfredi, Eustachio (1748). Rime di Eustachio Manfredi con un ristretto della sua vita ed alcuni lugubri componimenti recitati in occasione della sua morte (in Italian). Bologna: Lelio dalla Volpe.
- Manfredi, Eustachio (1749). Instituzioni astronomiche (in Italian). In Bologna: nella stamperia di Lelio dalla Volpe.
- Manfredi, Eustachio (1755). Elementi della geometria piana e solida e della trigonometria (in Italian). In Bologna: Lelio dalla Volpe.
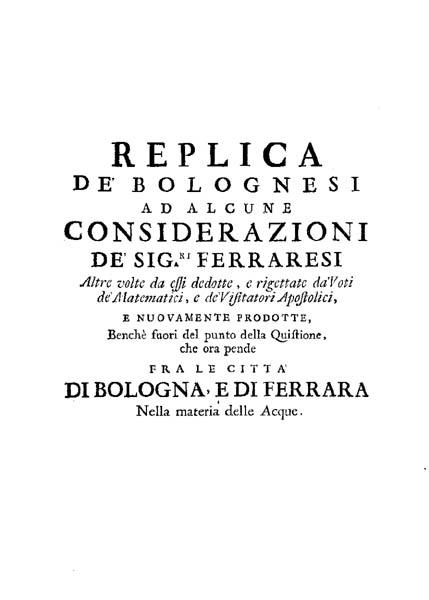
Replica de' bolognesi ad alcune considerazioni de' sig.ri ferraresi nella materia delle acque, 1717

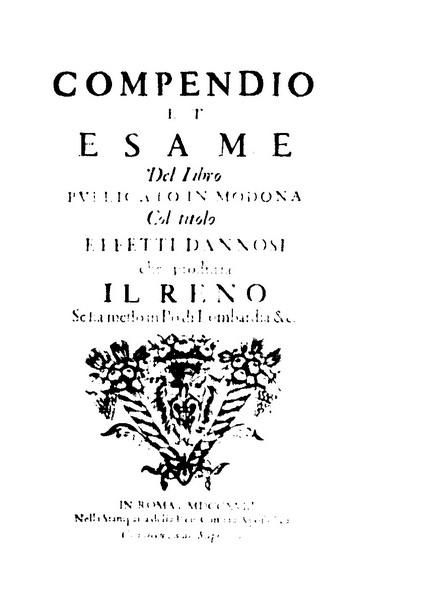
Compendio et esame del libro pubblicato in Modena col titolo Effetti dannosi che produrrà il Reno se sia messo in Po' di Lombardia, 1718

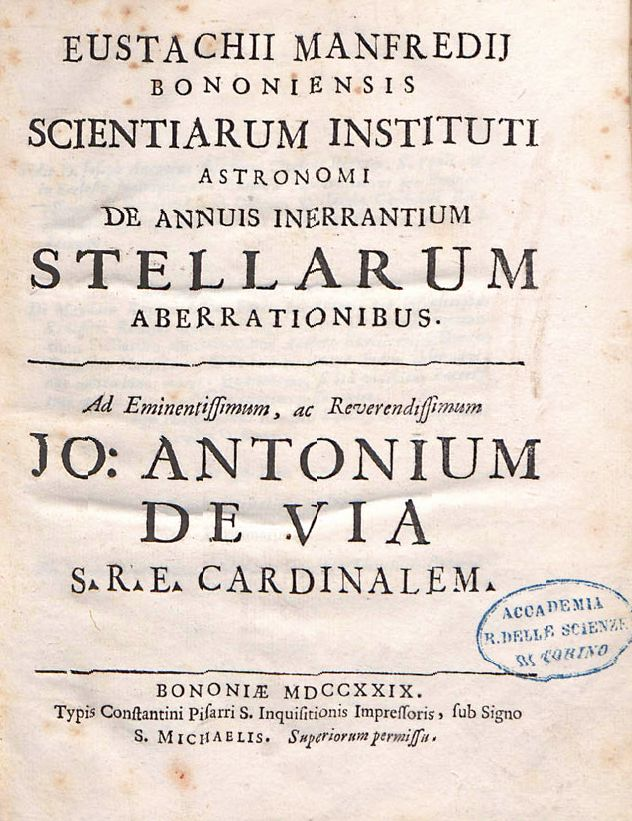
De annuis inerrantium stellarum aberrationibus, 1729

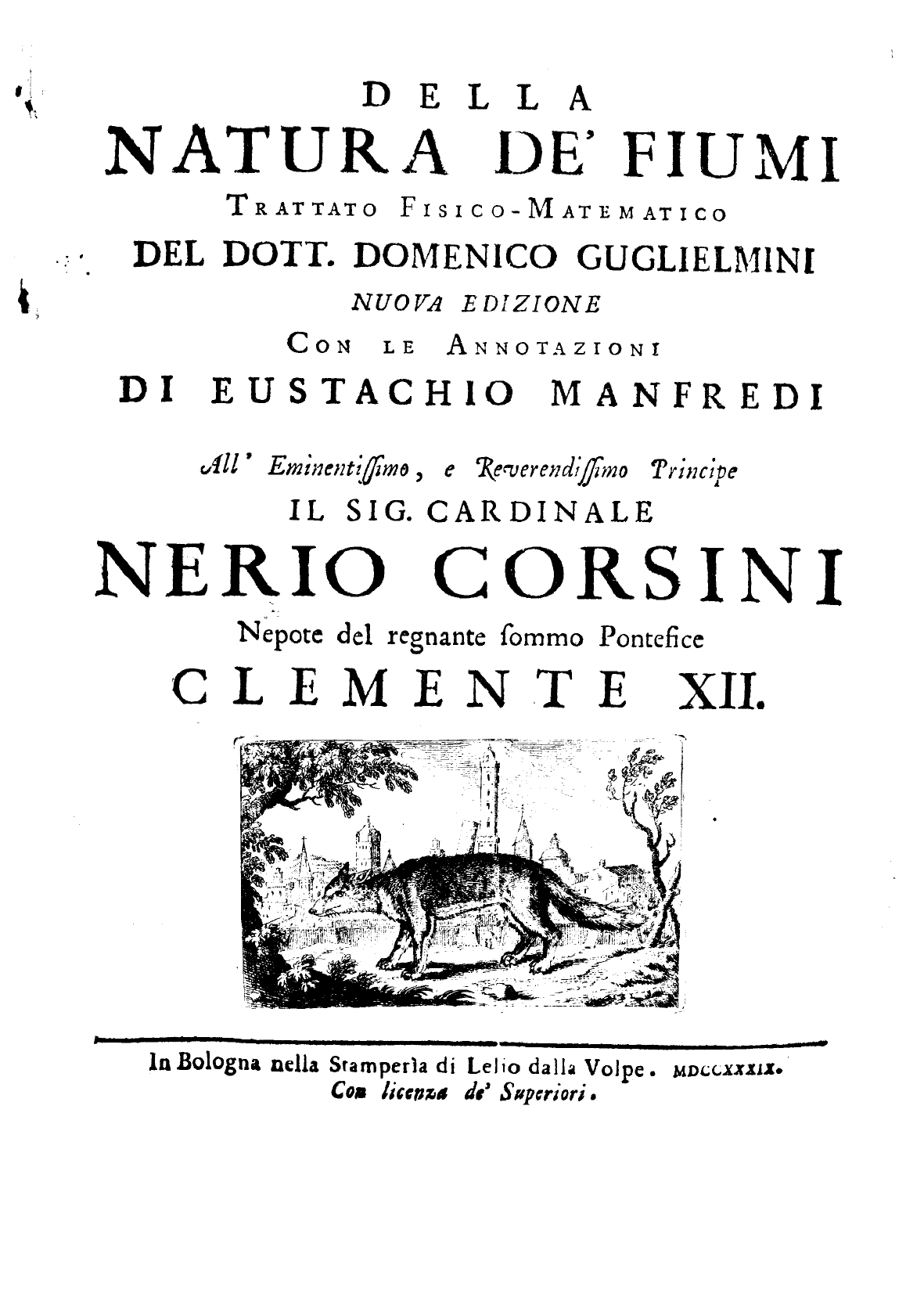
Domenico Guglielmini, Della natura de’ fiumi, trattato fisico-matematico. Nuova edizione con le annotazioni di Eustachio Manfredi, 1739

== Notes and references ==
Citations

Sources

- Tabarroni, Giorgio (1970). "Manfredi, Eustachio". In Charles Coulston Gillispie (ed.). Dictionary of Scientific Biography. Vol. 9. New York: Charles Scribner's Sons. pp. 77–8.
- O'Connor, John J.; Robertson, Edmund F., "Eustachio Manfredi", MacTutor History of Mathematics Archive, University of St Andrews
- "Accademia delle Scienze dell'Istituto di Bologna". Scholarly Societies Project. University of Waterloo. Archived from the original on 6 January 2013.
- Gualandi, Andrea; Bonoli, Fabrizio (2004). "Eustachio Manfredi e la prima conferma osservativa della teoria dell'aberrazione annua della luce" (PDF). Dipartimento di Astronomia, Università degli Studi di Bologna. Archived from the original (PDF) on 3 November 2014.
- Chalmers, Alexander (1815). "MANFREDI (Eustachio)". The General Biographical Dictionary: A New Edition.
- Weller, Emil Ottokar (1856). Index pseudonymorum. Leipzig: Falcke & Rössler.
- Bego, Meri (1979). "Cultura e accademie a Bologna per opera di Anton Felice Marsigli e di Eustachio Manfredi". Accademie e cultura. Aspetti storici tra Sei e Settecento. Florence: Casa Editrice Leo S. Olschki. pp. 95–116.
- Fisher, John (2010). "Conjectures and reputations: The composition and reception of James Bradley's paperon the aberration of light with some reference to a third unpublished version". The British Journal for the History of Science. 43 (1): 19–48. doi:10.1017/S0007087409990379. JSTOR 40731002. PMID 28974287.

Further reading

- Fontenelle, Bernard Le Bovier de (1739). "Éloge de Mr. Manfredi". Histoire de l'Académie royale des sciences pour l'année 1739. Paris: 59–72.
- Ambrosoli, Francesco (1832). Manuale della letteratura italiana. Vol. IV. Milan: per Antonio Fontana. pp. 305–313.
- Maier, Bruno (1973). "Manfredi, Eustachio". In Vittore Branca (ed.). Dizionario critico della letteratura italiana. Vol. 2. Turin: UTET. pp. 480–4.
- Gian Pietro Zanotti Cavazzoni, "Ritratto di Eustachio Manfredi" in Francesco Ambrosoli, Manuale della letteratura italiana, Milano: per Antonio Fontana, 1832, vol. IV pp. 477–81

External links

- Media related to Eustachio Manfredi at Wikimedia Commons
- Bònoli, F. (2007). "Manfredi, Eustachio". Biographical Encyclopedia of Astronomers. New York: Springer. pp. 733–735. doi:10.1007/978-0-387-30400-7_897. ISBN 978-0-387-31022-0.
- Baldini, Ugo (2007). "MANFREDI, Eustachio". Dizionario Biografico degli Italiani (in Italian). Vol. 68: Malatacca–Mangelli. Rome: Istituto dell'Enciclopedia Italiana. ISBN 978-88-12-00032-6.
- Bortolotti, Ettore (1934). "MANFREDI, Eustachio". Enciclopedia Italiana. Rome: Istituto dell'Enciclopedia Italiana.
