= Maddalena and Teresa Manfredi =

Italian astronomers and translators (1673 – 1744 and 1679 – 1767)

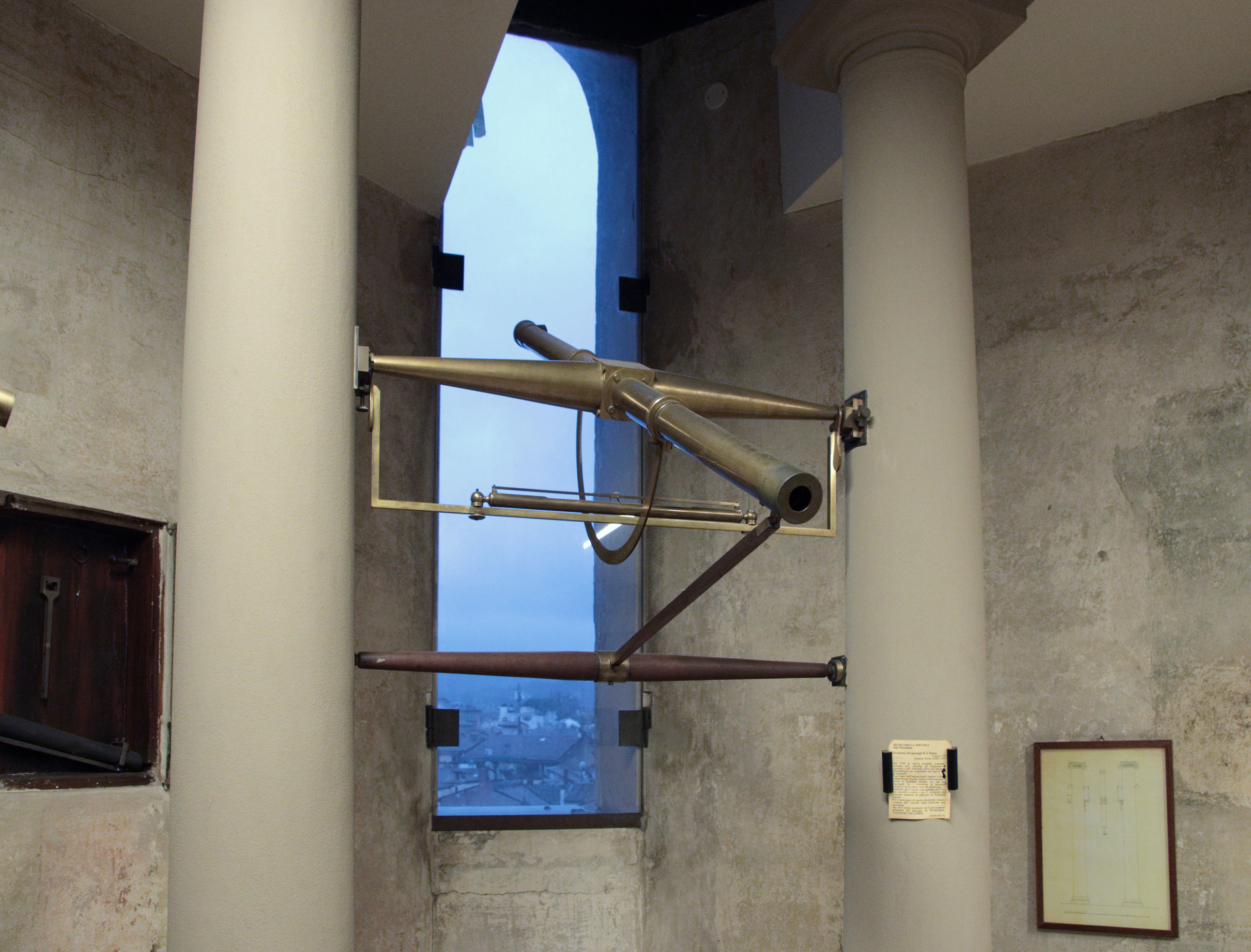
A meridian circle commissioned by Eustachio Manfredi. The Manfredi siblings used equipment including a five-metre-long telescope to carry out their astronomical measurements.

Maddalena and Teresa Manfredi (1673 – 1744 and 1679 – 1767) were Italian astronomers and translators. Their calculations contributed to the popular Ephemerides of Celestial Motion by their brother Eustachio Manfredi, and their translations of poetry and fairy-tales, in collaboration with Teresa and Angiola Zanotti, were significant in establishing conventions for the recording of the Bolognese dialect.

== Family ==
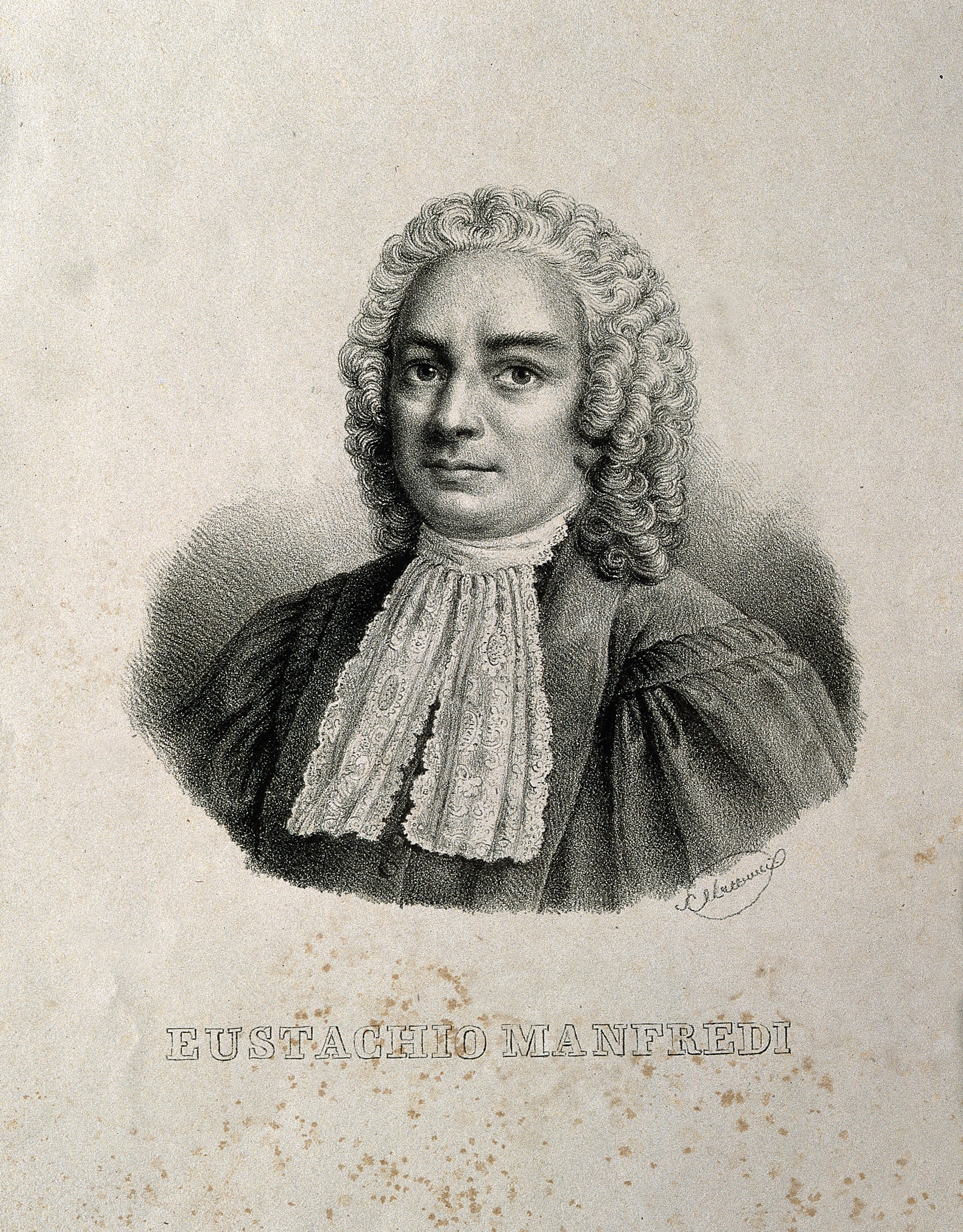
Eustachio Manfredi, Maddalena and Teresa's brother with whom they lived and carried out their astronomical work.

Maddalena and Teresa were the daughters of notary Alfonso Manfredi and his wife Anna Maria Fiorini. They had four brothers: Eustachio, Gabriele, Emilio and Eraclito; and another sister, Agnese. Three of their brothers studied at the University of Bologna and entered scientific professions. Eustachio, who became the head of the family, was a professor at the University from 1699.

== Astronomy ==
Educated in a convent of tertiary nuns, Maddalena and Teresa learned Latin, mathematics and astronomy from their family and their circle of learned friends, including the Accademia degli Inquieti ('Society of the Restless') formed by a teenage Eustachio to encourage discussions of literature and the sciences in their house.

In 1700, the family moved into the palace of Luigi Ferdinando Marsili. Maddalena and Teresa also moved with Eustachio when he became director of the Astronomical Observatory of Bologna in 1711.

The Manfredi family began making observations of the positions of astronomical objects at an astronomical dome that was prepared in their home in order to create ephemeris. The sisters carried out the computational work, which would have involved coming up with the best algorithm for the task and completing the calculations. Developments in computational techniques meant that some of the calculations could be carried out by non-specialists, meaning that their sister Agnese could also have collaborated in the work.

In 1715, Eustachio published his Ephemerides of celestial motion, which became a widely used reference for European astronomers. Eustachio credited his sisters with helping with the ephemeris since 1712, and particularly Maddalena with calculating the table of latitudes and longitudes included in the publication. She carried out the calculations 'in 1702 or 1703.'

The learning of the Manfredi sisters was acknowledged by Pope Benedict XIV and his friend Giovan Nicolò Bandiera, who praised their skill in 'suppositions of analysis, the meridian line, and ephemerides.'

== Translation ==
Il Pentamerone was one of the works translated by the sisters.

Maddalena and Teresa carried out translations in Bolognese with their friends Teresa and Angiola Zanotti, another pair of learned and wealthy sisters who were the daughters of the artist Giampietro Zanotti, a member of the Accademia degli Inquieti. In 1740–1, the Manfredi and Zanotti sisters published a three-volume translation of the poem Bertoldo con Bertoldino e Cacasenno from Italian to the Bolognese dialect. This became 'the Bolognese bestseller of the century,' running to five editions. In 1742, they translated part of the Pentamerone by Giambattista Basile, publishing it anonymously as La chiaqlira dla banzola (The Gossip on the Bench), which had gone through six editions by 1883. The translation was inspired by the sisters' interest in the dialect and proverbs of their region, and contributed to fixing the spellings of the Bolognese dialect. La chiaqlira became a model for all subsequent translations into Bolognese.
