= San Vittorino, Cittaducale =

Church in Cittaducale, Italy

Coordinates: 42.3764°N 12.9887°E

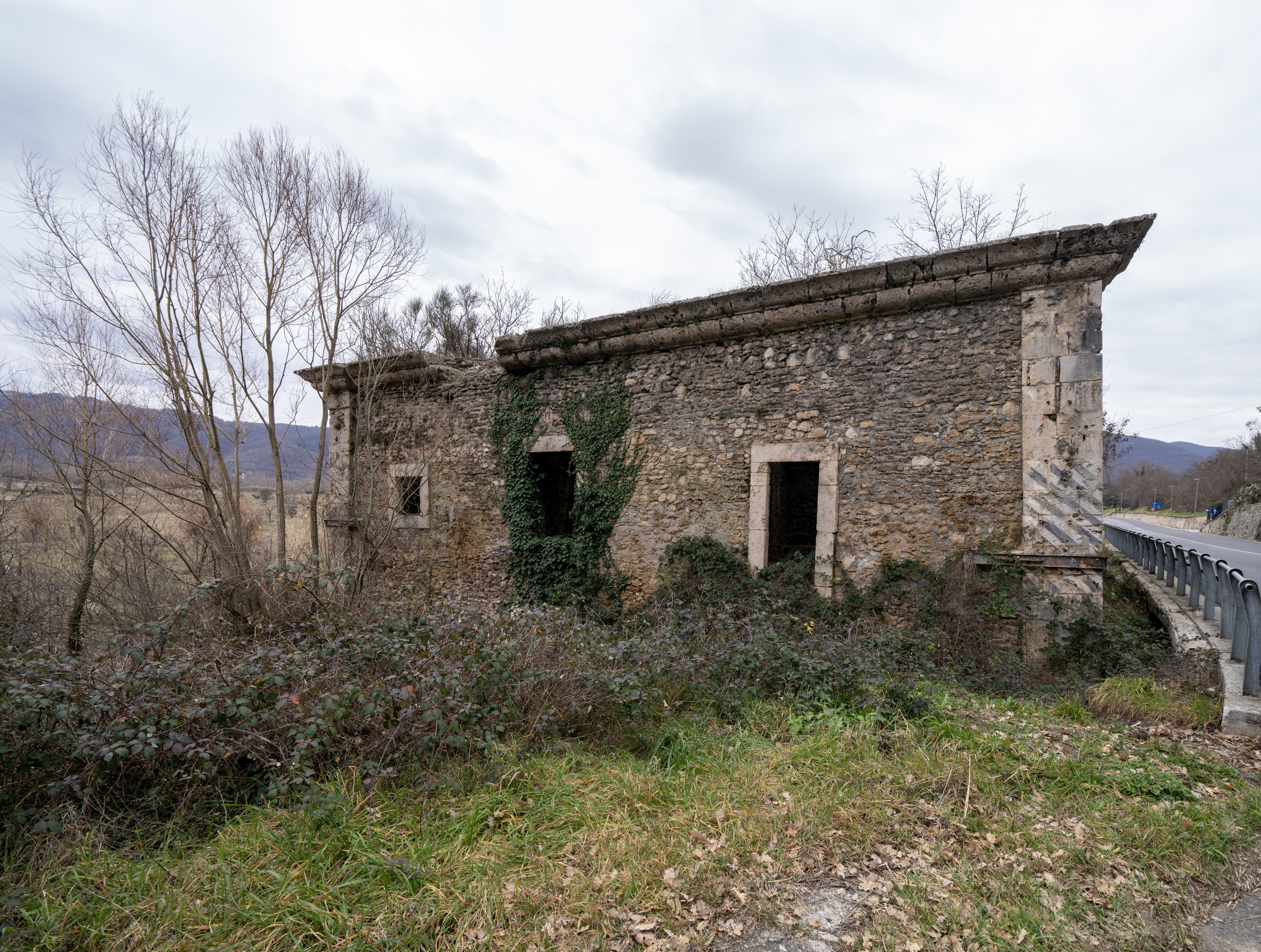
Ruins of the church in 2023

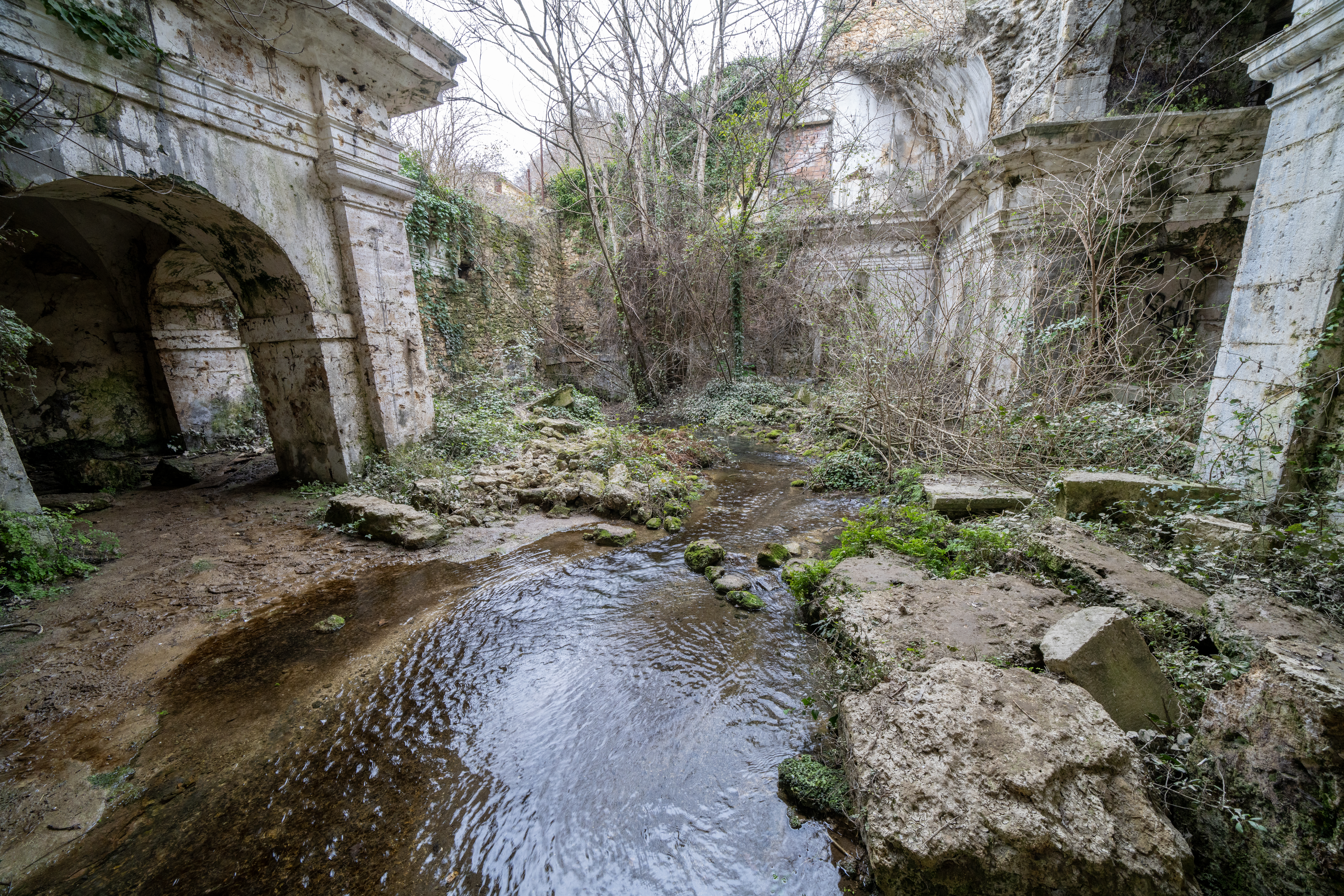
Interior

San Vittorino is a Baroque former Roman Catholic church in Cittaducale, province of Rieti, region of Lazio, Italy. Soon after completion in 1613, the church collapsed into a sinkhole, and the roofless ruins remain, with the facade sheltering a mineral-water pool that streams out the former portal. The combination of ruins and nature create an air of mystery; the church was used in some of the scenes of the movie Nostalghia.

The current address is 6 Strada Statale 4, Cittaducale, Italy. 42.376326, 12.988697.
