= Vittorio Mancini =

Vittorio Mancini may refer to:

- Vittorio Mancini (philatelist), Italian philatelist
- Vittorio Mancini (wrestler) (born 1936), Sammarinese wrestler
- Victor Mancini (born 2002), American ice hockey player
