= Vittorio Continella =

Italian footballer (born 2002)

Personal information
- Date of birth: 31 December 2002 (age 23)
- Place of birth: Turin, Italy
- Height: 1.78 m (5 ft 10 in)
- Position: Midfielder

Youth career
- Juventus
- Perugia
- –2020: Spezia
- 2020–2021: Torino

Senior career*
Years	Team	Apps	(Gls)
2021–2022	Casale	36	(2)
2022–2024	AEL Limassol	27	(2)
2024	Odra Opole	11	(1)
- * Club domestic league appearances and goals as of 31 May 2024

Vittorio Continella (born 31 December 2002) is an Italian former professional footballer who played as a midfielder.

== Club career ==
Born in Turin, Continella played in the youth sectors of Juventus, Perugia and Spezia, before joining Torino in the summer of 2020.

In August 2021, he joined Serie D side Casale on a permanent deal. Throughout the 2021–22 season, he made a total amount of 35 senior appearances and scored two goals, as the club finished third in their group.

On 19 July 2022, Continella officially joined Cypriot side AEL Limassol on a free transfer, signing a two-year contract, with an option for two more seasons. He subsequently made his debut for the club on 28 August 2022, starting in a 2–1 league defeat to Aris Limassol. On 30 April 2023, he scored his first professional goal in a 1–1 league draw against Olympiakos Nicosia.

On 5 January 2024, Continella terminated his contract with AEL by mutual consent. On 20 January, he signed a six-month deal with Polish club Odra Opole, with an extension option until the end of 2025. On 1 July 2024, it was announced he left the club after not extending his contract.

On 27 January 2025, Continella announced via his Instagram account that he had decided to retire from professional football, due to personal reasons.

== Style of play ==
Continella is a midfielder who can play in every position of a three-man midfield, but mainly acts in the box-to-box role; he has been mainly regarded for his passing range, as well as his positioning.

== Career statistics ==
As of match played 30 May 2024

Appearances and goals by club, season and competition
Club	Season	League			National cup (Note: Includes Cypriot Cup)		Europe		Other		Total	
Club	Season	Division	Apps	Goals	Apps	Goals	Apps	Goals	Apps	Goals	Apps	Goals
Casale	2021–22	Serie D	35	2	0	0	—		1 (Note: Appearance in Serie D promotion play-offs)	0	36	2
AEL Limassol	2022–23	Cypriot First Division	26	2	2	0	—		0	0	28	2
AEL Limassol	2023–24	Cypriot First Division	1	0	0	0	—		0	0	1	0
AEL Limassol	Total		27	2	2	0	—		0	0	29	2
Odra Opole	2023–24	I liga	10	1	—		—		1 (Note: Appearance in I liga promotion play-offs)	0	11	1
Career total			72	5	2	0	0	0	2	0	76	5
