= Vittorio Blanseri =

Italian painter

Vittorio Blanseri (c. 1735–1775) (or Blancheri) was an Italian painter, born at Venice. He trained with the Cavalière Claudio Beaumont, and succeeded him in the service of the court of Turin. He painted a St Louis fainting, supported by an angel for the church of San Pelagio.
