= Vittorio Reggiani =

Italian painter

Vittorio Reggianini (1853 or 1858 – 1939) was an Italian painter. He depicted upper-middle-class life in his works, and in many of his paintings, women and children occupy the main focus.

Vittorio Reggianini studied at the Academy of Fine Arts in Modena and was later elected professor there. He moved to Florence, where he exhibited from 1907 to 1911. He was influenced by the work of other Florentine contemporaries, such as Federico Andreotti and Francesco Vinea. Their works feature similar themes and sometimes the same model.

Reggianini's work was sensual and his depiction of textiles was masterful. On the other hand, he was also skilled in depicting the lives of peasants who lived in modest circumstances.

== Gallery ==
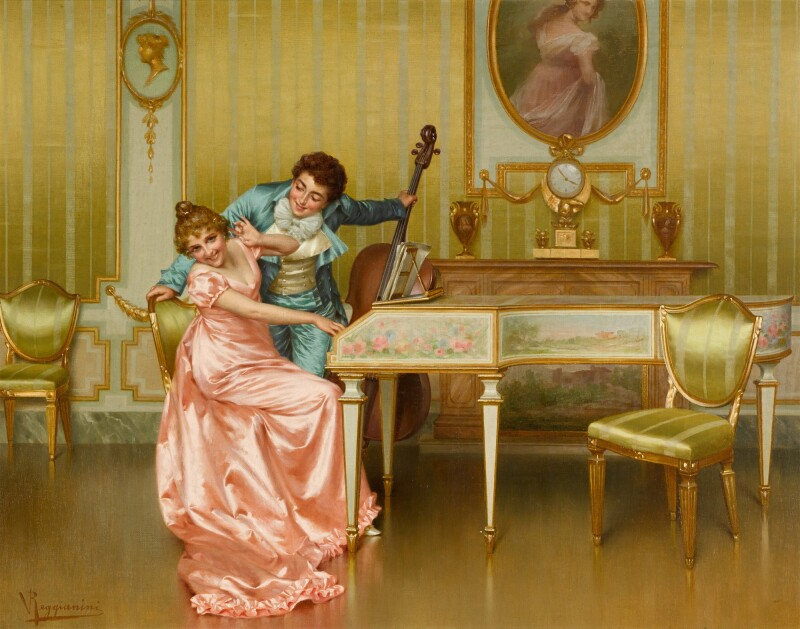
The Music Lesson

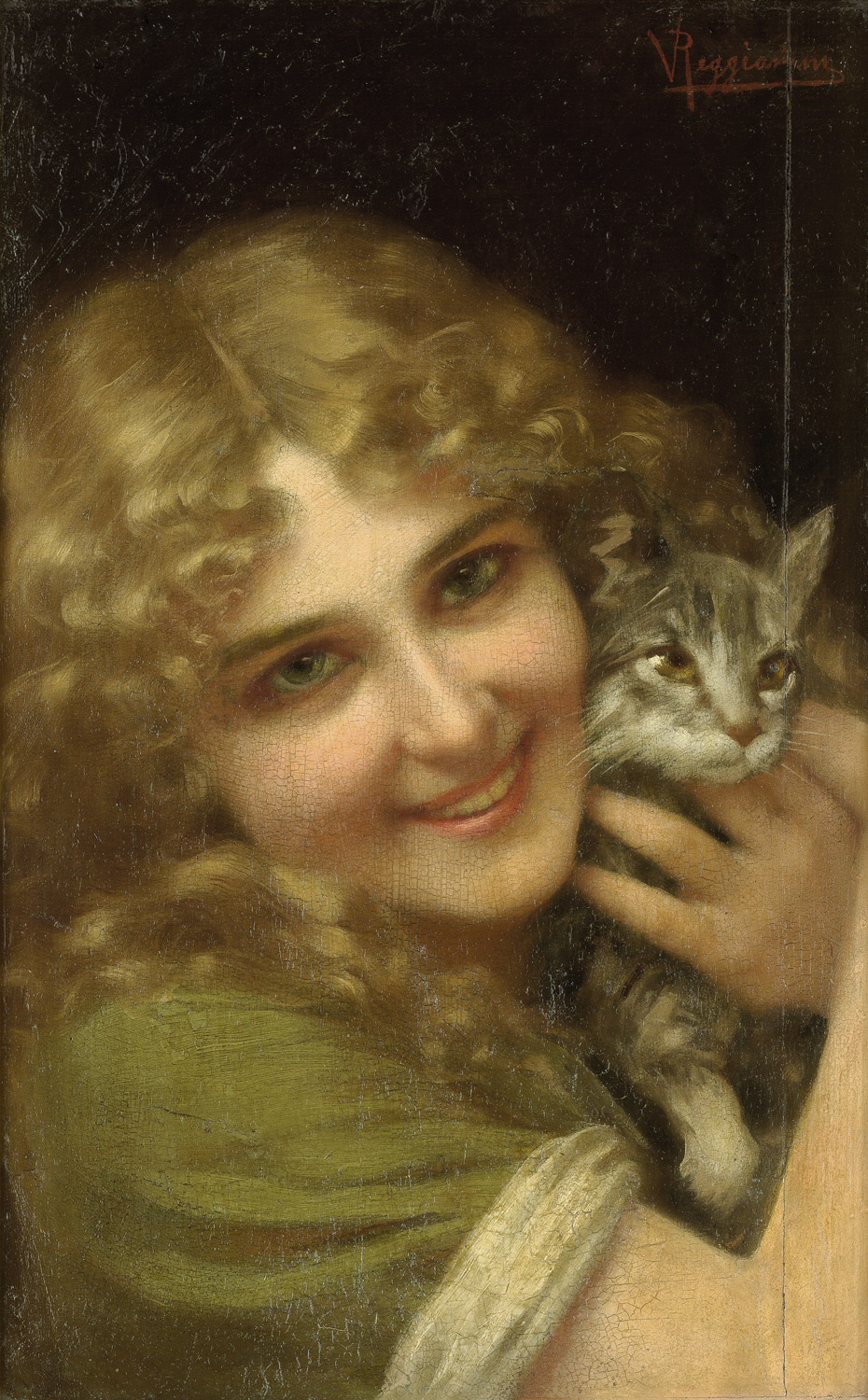
Young Woman with a kitten

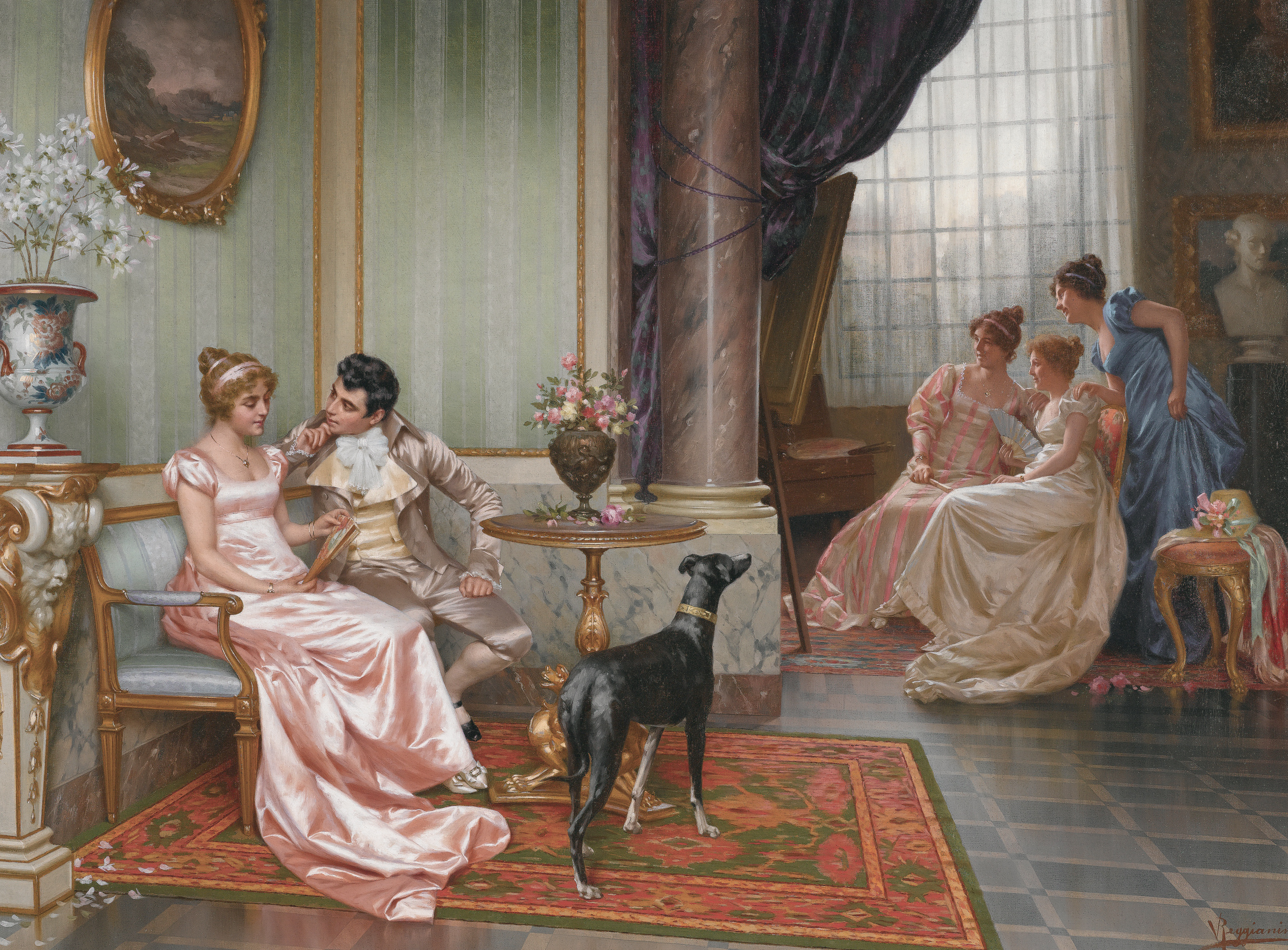
Admiration

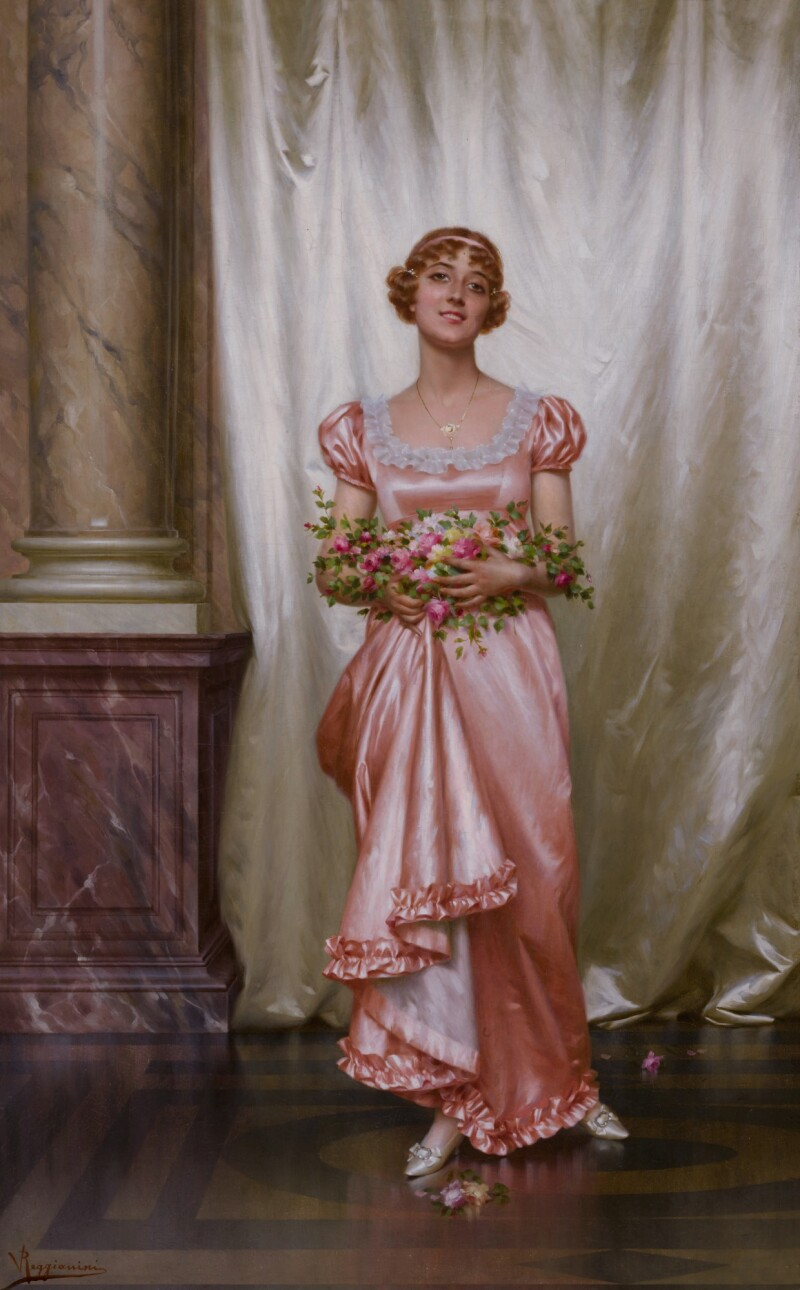
Roses

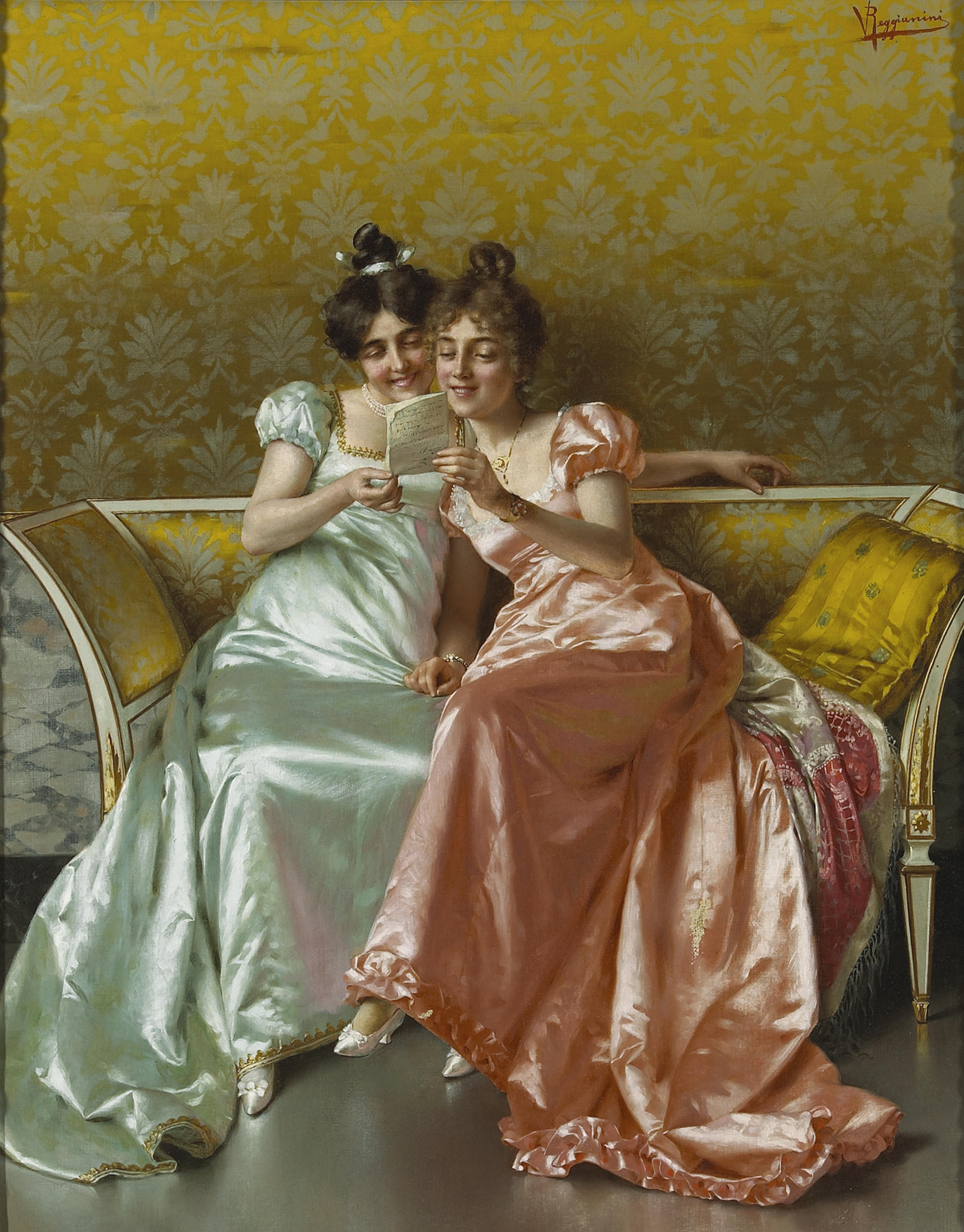
The Letter

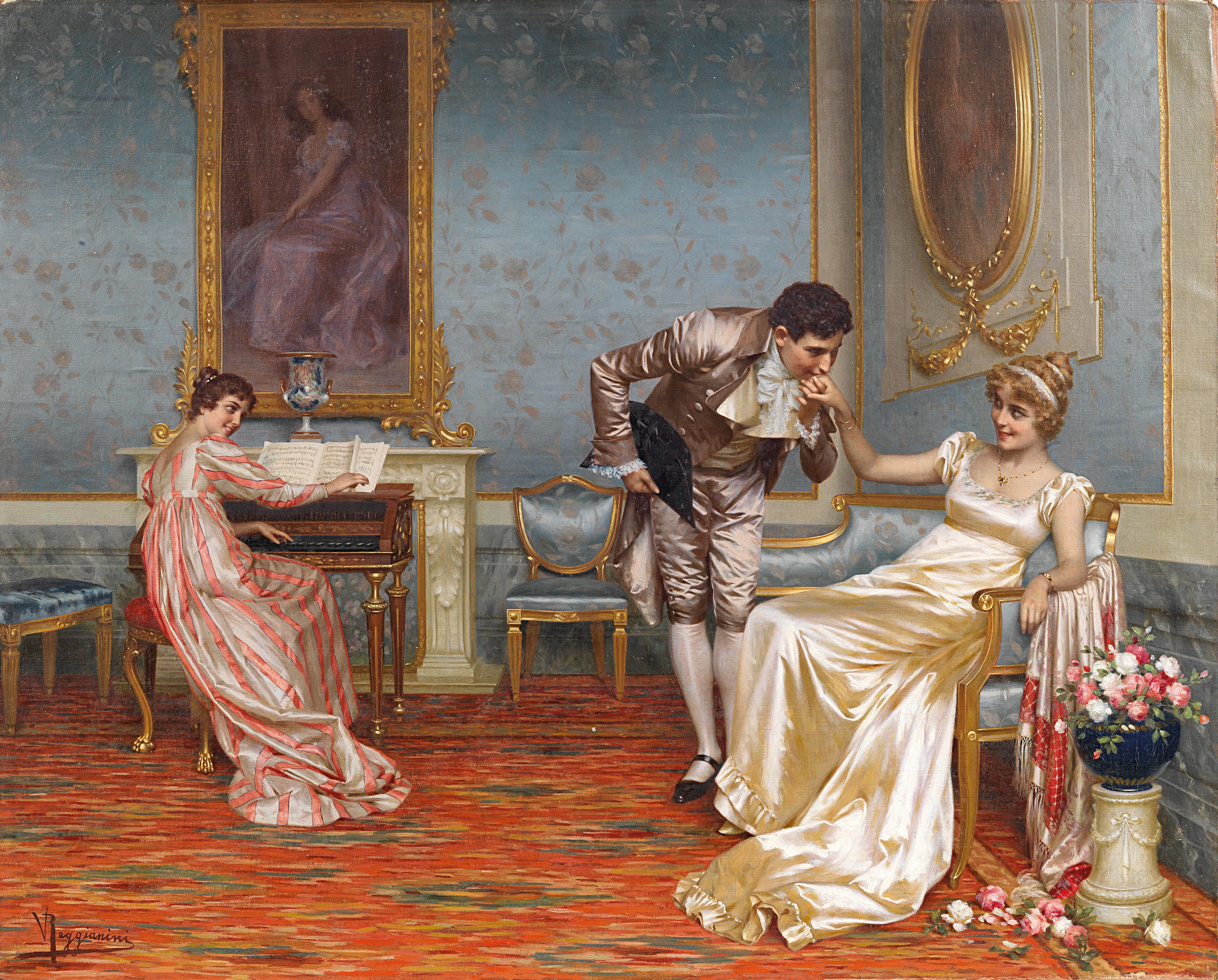
The Suitor

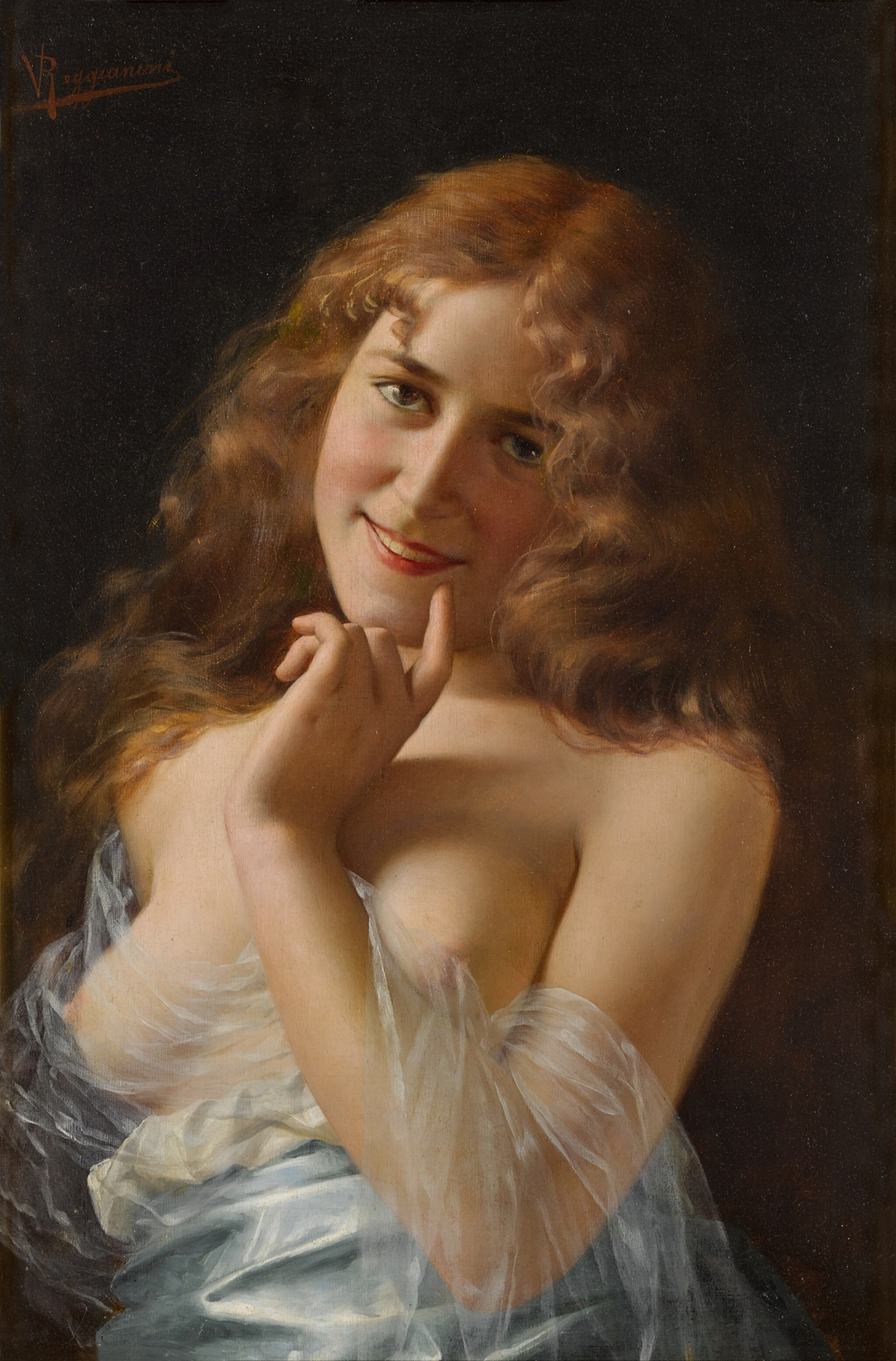
Flirtatious Glances

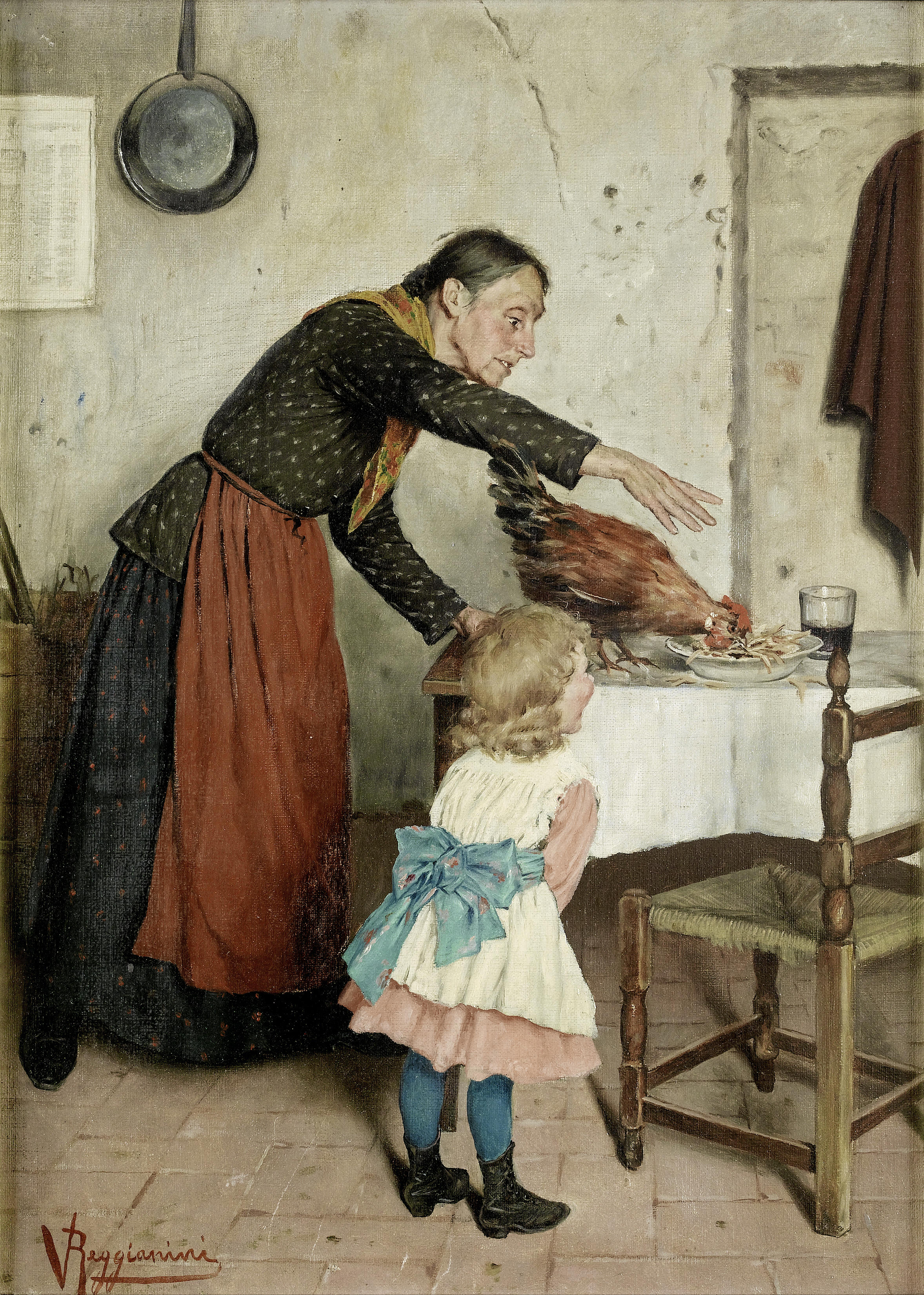
An Unwelcome Guest
