= Vittorio Emanuele Falsitta =

Italian politician and lawyer (born 1966)

Vittorio Emanuele Falsitta (born 7 June 1966) is an Italian lawyer and politician.

Falsitta was educated at the University of Milan, where he obtained his degree in law in 1991. He joined the Italian political party Forza Italia in 2001. In the same year, he was elected by majority system in District V (Lombardy) - Constituency: Lodi, and became a member of the Chamber of Deputies, a position he held for 5 years.

== Political career ==
From 2001 to 2006 Falsitta was a member of Forza Italia. He was the head of the VI Finance Commission of the Italian Parliament. During his time in office, he was the rapporteur for the reform of the state tax system. In January 2003, he took part in the World Social Forum in Porto Alegre, where he presented a tax reform manifesto based on the principles of ethical taxation. Due to differences on this issue, he left Forza Italia at the end of the legislature in 2006.

From 2003 to 2005, Falsitta was the first signatory of three tax bills presented to the Chamber of Deputies:

- C. 3774 - about ecological tax reform and the promotion of sustainable development (presented: 12 March 2003; withdrawn: 3 July 2003).
- C. 4130 - about ethical taxation and the promotion of sustainable development (presented: 2 July 2003).
- C. 5836 - about tax measures regarding sustainable competition among companies (presented: 11 May 2005).

== Other activities ==
Falsitta is a professor of Criminal Tax Law and former extraordinary professor of Tax Law at the European University of Rome. He is also the Scientific Director of the Research Center on Ethical Taxation. He currently works as a tax lawyer in Milan.

== Publications ==
He is the author of monographs and journalistic articles about tax law. After retiring from politics in 2006, Falsitta focused on ethical issues related to taxation and its impact on society through both non-fiction and fiction works.
