= Leigh Brooklyn =

American figurative artist

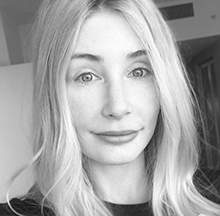
- Born: Cleveland, Ohio, U.S.
- Education: Cleveland Institute of Art
- Occupation: Figurative artist
- Years active: 2004–present
- Website: leighbrooklyn.com

Leigh Brooklyn is an American figurative artist.

== Life ==
Wendy Leigh Knapp was born and raised outside of Cleveland, Ohio. She currently lives and works in her hometown of Cleveland.

== Education ==
She began her formal studies in 2005 when she studied with a local portrait artist in Cleveland. In 2006, she received mention for her artwork in National VFW Women's Auxiliary Magazine. Brooklyn enrolled in the Columbus College of Art and Design in 2006 but later transferred to the Cleveland Institute of Art after being inspired by the work of forensic artists who helped officials solve a missing-person's case. Brooklyn earned a degree in Biomedical Illustration in 2011.

== Career ==
She explored biomedical illustration as a profession and worked with several hospitals, museums, and research facilities including the Cleveland Clinic. She ultimately decided not to pursue this career path, and instead she chose to explore oil painting with figurative or portrait subjects. She uses her art to showcase marginalized communities to uplift them and bring attention to their struggles, including portraits of transgender individuals or homeless people. She focuses her work on more controversial topics like gender, sex, race, and religion to encourage respect and appreciation for all communities.

In June 2018, as Leigh Brooklyn, she was chosen for an artistic project for the Cleveland RTA as a part of the Inter|Urban Art Project. The focus of her work shifted to women empowerment after tumultuous events in her personal life. She learned how to sculpt and weld to incorporate 3D elements into her works focusing on creating an army of women fighting for women.

In 2020, Brooklyn created a series of 10 drawings entitled Love Bomb.
