= Santa Maria Maddalena, Bologna =

Church in Bologna, Italy

The church of Santa Maria Maddalena is found in central Bologna, Italy.

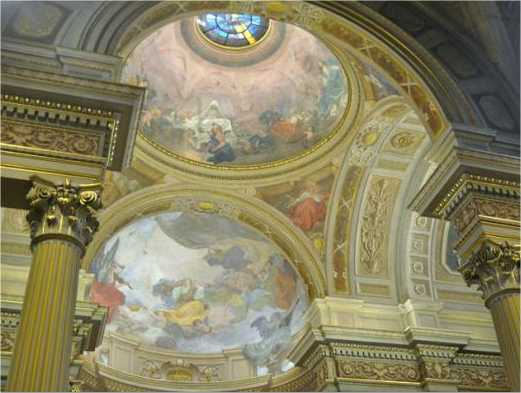
interior of cupola ceiling Santa Maria Maddalena Bologna painted by Domenico Ferri and Antonio Mosca

== History ==
A church at the site existed in the 11th century, but the structure was rebuilt over the centuries. During 1564, the anterior portico was designed by Giovanni Piccinini from Como. In 1758, a major reconstruction was designed by Alfonso Torreggiani. The church contains a Madonna delle Febbri attributed to Lippo di Dalmasio.

Other works once found in the church, included:

- Santa Caterina and Madonna and child by Bartolommeo Passarotti.
- La Concezione (relief) by Angelo Piò .
- Christ preaching to the Magdalen by Francesco Cavazzoni .
- Crucifix on the entrance painted by Lavinia Fontana.
- Virgin with St Joseph and John the Baptist painted by Francesco Monti.
- St Sebastian painted by Francesco Calza.
- A door leads to an internal church called Santa Croce, which has a facade painted with the Triumph of the Cross by Felice Torelli.
- A wall frescoed with Glory of Magdalen by Ercole Graziani.
- Via Crucis was painted by Giuseppe Marchesi, il Sansone.
- Christ mourned by the Maries was painted by Giuseppe Mazza .
- Interior of cupola ceiling and apse was painted in 1905 by Antonio Mosca (1870-1951) and Domenico Ferri (1857-1940).
