= San Vittore =

San Vittore may refer to:

== In places ==
- San Vittore, Switzerland, a municipality in Graubünden, Switzerland
- San Vittore del Lazio, a comune in Lazio, Italy
- San Vittore Olona, a comune in Lombardy, Italy
- San Vittore, a hamlet in the municipality of Fossano, Piedmont, Italy

== In buildings ==
- Basilica of San Vittore, Varese, a church in Varese, Lombardy, Italy
- Chiesa di San Vittore (Esino Lario), a church in Esino Lario, Italy
- Osservatorio San Vittore, an observatory in Bologna, Italy
- Santi Vittore e Carlo (Genoa), a church in Genoa, Italy
- San Vittore alle Chiuse, an abbey and church in Genga, Marche, Italy
- San Vittore Prison (Carcere di San Vittore), a prison in the city centre of Milan, Italy

== See also ==
- St. Victor (disambiguation)
