= Laurentino =

Municipality in southern Brazil

- Municipality
- Flag Coat of arms

- Location in Santa Catarina, Brazil

- Location in Brazil
- Coordinates: 27°13′01″S 49°43′58″W
- Country: Brazil
- Region: South
- State: Santa Catarina
- Mesoregion: Vale do Itajai

Government
  - Mayor: Gilberto Marchi

Area
  - Total: 30.631 sq mi (79.333 km^{2})

Population (2020)
  - Total: 7,063
  - Density: 230.6/sq mi (89.03/km^{2})
- Time zone: UTC -3
- Website: www.laurentino.sc.gov.br

Laurentino is a municipality in the state of Santa Catarina in the South region of Brazil.

== See also ==
- List of municipalities in Santa Catarina
