= Vittorio de Marco (classicist) =

Italian classical scholar (1899–1988)

Vittorio de Marco (6 April 1899 – 12 April 1988) was an Italian classical scholar, Professor in Greek and Latin grammar at the University of Milan.

== Biography ==
Vittorio de Marco was born in Naples from a noble family. He grew up in the family's mansion in Sant'Agata de' Goti, receiving private education, and enlisted as a volunteer in the Great War, being decorated with a silver medal for an act of courage during an offensive on 20 June 1918, which also left him with an injured leg.

In the interwar period, he moved to Rome and enrolled at first in the Scuola Superiore di Ingegneria (now Faculty of Engineering of the Sapienza University) graduating in 1925, then moved to the Faculty of Humanities, influenced by Benedetto Croce. Here he attended Cesare de Lollis' seminar in French literature, and studied ancient history under Julius Beloch, Ancient Greek literature under Nicola Festa, and Byzantine studies under Giuseppe Mercati.

De Marco graduated in 1927 defending a thesis in Ancient Greek literature, tutored by Festa, and immediately won an assistantship. In 1931 he was habilitated to high school teaching and became professor in Lanciano and later in Parma; in 1933 he was exempted from teaching and assigned to the Accademia dei Lincei, where he worked as secretary to the Comitato per l'Edizione Nazionale dei Classici Greci e Latini. In 1938 he became substitute professor in Ancient Greek literature at the University of Milan, replacing Achille Vogliano; from 1941 to 1943 he covered the same position at the University of Pavia. In 1953 he became Professor in Greek and Latin grammar at the University of Milan, where he also taught Latin literature and Greek palaeography and directed the Institute of Classical Philology, retiring in 1974. He was a Fellow of the German Archaeological Institute at Rome and correspondent (1962), then Fellow (1968), of the Istituto Lombardo.

After retiring, de Marco returned to Rome, where he lived with his wife Gemma Oddone (d. 1979) in a mansion in front of the Villa Borghese gardens. He died in 1988, a week after turning 89.

== Research activity ==
De Marco wrote on a number of ancient authors, from Mimnermus to Sextus Empiricus. His main topic of research was history of ancient scholarship, with particular interest for the scholia on Sophocles and Homer's Iliad.

He published the critical edition of the scholia on Oedipus at Colonus and part of the scholia Didymi on the Iliad. His edition of the Sophoclean scholia is regarded as a significant progress in studied on the reception of Sophocles and scholarship on Greek tragedy. His projected edition of the scholia minora on the Iliad wasn't completed, but an interim critical text for the first seventeen rhapsodies of the Iliad was prepared and shared with several colleagues, including his student Mario Geymonat, and Nigel Wilson. Following de Marco's expressed wish, his notes and preparatory unpublished researches were delivered to Franco Montanari (Emeritus, University of Genoa), for the edition to be completed.

== Publications ==
Bibliography up to 1970 in: AA. VV. (1970). Studi in onore di Vittorio de Marco. Acme, 23 (1–2). Milan: Giuffré. pp. 243–245.

- de Marco, V. (1932). "Sulla tradizione manoscritta degli Scholia minora all'Iliade". MAL. Series VI. 4 (4): 373–407.
- de Marco, V. (1936). "Sulla tradizione manoscritta degli scolii sofoclei". SIFC. Series II. 13: 3–44.
- de Marco, V. (1937). "De scholiis in Sophoclis Tragoedias quibusdam". MAL. Series VI. 6 (2): 105–229.
- de Marco, V. (1941). "Da un manoscritto degli Scholia Minora all'Iliade". ARAI. Series VII. 7 (2–Suppl): 125–145.
- de Marco, V. (1954). "La scienza in Roma". In Arnaldi, F.; Ussani, V. (eds.). Guida allo studio della civiltà romana antica. Naples: Istituto Editoriale del Mezzogiorno. pp. 537–568.
- de Marco, V., ed. (1946). Scholia minora in Homeri Iliadem. Vol. I.1. Vatican City: Typis Polyglottis Vaticanis.
- de Marco, V., ed. (1952). Scholia in Sophoclis Oedipum Coloneum. Rome: Breitschneider.
- de Marco, V. (1975). "Philostephanos ed Esiodo". PP. 165: 453–462.
- de Marco, V. (1984). "Frammenti di Teopompo, Teofrasto, Callimaco". SIFC. Series III. 2: 193–201.

== Bibliography ==
- Geymonat, M. (1989). "Vittorio de Marco †". Gnomon. 61 (2): 188–190. JSTOR 27690116.
- Grilli, A. (1989). "Ricordo di Vittorio de Marco". RIL. Parte generale e atti ufficiali. 123: 105–112.
- Lehnus, L. (2007). Appunti di storia degli studi classici (2nd ed.). Milan: CUEM.
- Montanari, F. (2023). "Note sulla tradizione manoscritta degli scholia D in Iliadem: Un caso di errore di archetipo". In Rengakos, A. (ed.). In the Company of Many Good Poets. Collected Papers of Franco Montanari. Vol. I. Berlin – Boston: De Gruyter. pp. 482–487. ISBN 978-3-11-077218-0. LCCN 2023939389.
- Xenis, G. A., ed. (2018). Scholia vetera in Sophoclis Oedipum Coloneum. Berlin – Boston: De Gruyter. ISBN 978-3-11-044733-0.
