= Vittorio Francesco Stancari =

Professor of mathematics at the University of Bologna

- Born: July 29, 1678; Bologna, Papal States
- Died: March 28, 1709 (aged 30); Bologna, Papal States
- Occupation: Mathematician
- Employer: University of Bologna
- Known for: Measurement of the pitch of sounds

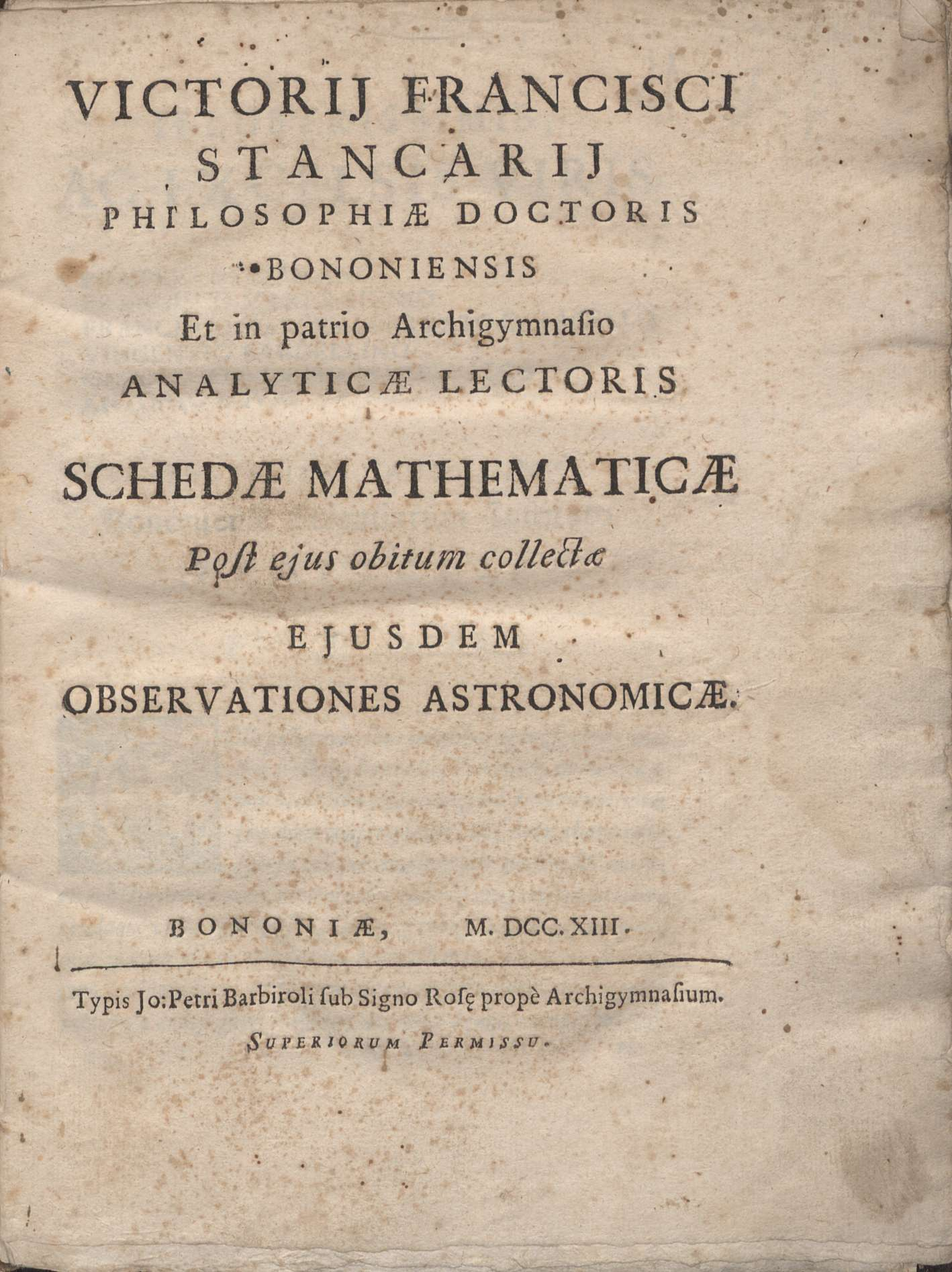
Schedae mathematicae post ejus obitum collectae ejusdem Observationes astronomicae, 1713

Vittorio Francesco Stancari (29 July 1678 – 28 March 1709) was a professor of mathematics at the University of Bologna who undertook research into the measurement of sounds, and into optics and hydrostatics.

== Career ==
Vittorio Francesco Stancari was born in Bologna in 1678. In 1698 he became a professor of mathematics at the University of Bologna. Stancari was one of a group of young men at the University who became interested in the techniques of Cartesian geometry and differential calculus, and who engaged in experiments and astronomical observation. Others were Eustachio Manfredi, his brother Gabriele Manfredi and Giuseppe Sentenziola Verzaglia. Of these, Gabriele Manfredi developed the most advanced understanding of mathematics. Stancari was awarded the chair of infinitesimal calculus in Bologna in 1708. He died in Bologna in 1709, aged about 31.

== Work ==
Stancari's dissertations and manuscripts show that he applied Leibnizian calculus to problems of physics, hydrodynamics, meteorology and mechanics. He was also aware of Sir Isaac Newton's Principia Mathematica, and discussed Newton in lectures before the Accademia degli Inquieti in Bologna.

Stancari developed a method of measuring the pitch of sound in 1706, using foil that was excited into vibration by rotating toothed wheels. Working in the observatory founded by Count Marsigli, Stancari and Eustachio Manfredi discovered the comet C/1707 W1 in the evening of 25 November 1707. They described it as visible to the naked eye, white, irregular and with a short, faint tail. It had the same apparent size as Jupiter.

Stancari experimented with Guillaume Amontons' air thermometer, where air in the bulb pushes up a column of mercury as it expands due to rising temperature. He discovered that the humidity of the air in the bulb had a significant effect on the readings.

== Bibliography ==
- Stancari, Vittorio Francesco; Manfredi, Eustachio (1713). Victorij Francisci Stancarij philosophiae doctoris Bononiensis et patrio archigymnasio analyticae lectoris Schedae mathematicae: post ejus obitum collectae ejusdem observationes astronomicae. Typis Jo: Petri Barbiroli sub signo Rose propè Archigymnasium.
- Stancari, Vittorio Francesco (1733). Lettera del signor Vittorio Francesco Stancari ... in cui parla della figura del seme del GebelIndi guardata e disaminata col microscopio, dell'ovaja delle anguille, del camaleonte e suoi occhi, come le uova empiatrate poco o nulla traspirino de'fonti o pozzi osservati sulle cime de'monti.
