= Vittorio De Feo =

Italian architect

- Born: 7 July 1928; Naples, Kingdom of Italy
- Died: 16 December 2002 (aged 74); Rome, Italy
- Education: Sapienza University of Rome
- Occupation: Architect

Vittorio De Feo (7 July 1928 – 16 December 2002) was an Italian architect.

== Life and career ==
De Feo graduated in architecture in 1955 and began his academic career the following year, teaching architectural composition at the IUAV in Venice, at the Sapienza University of Rome, and later at the Faculty of Engineering at the University of Rome Tor Vergata, where he was also one of the founding members.

Initially interested in Soviet constructivism (on which he was among the first scholars in Italy), De Feo developed a design research focused on "the formal experimentation of simple geometric solids and their expressive potential". Among his notable works are the RAI Club in Rome (1965), the Technical Institute for Surveyors in Terni (1969, with Errico Ascione), the cafeteria and student housing for the Faculty of Engineering in Rome (1984), the residential complex in Ponte della Pietra in Perugia (1984–89), the reconstruction of the San Giovanni district in Naples (1982–90), the renovation of the Italian Embassy in Berlin (from 1991), the headquarters of the Province of Pordenone (1998), and the university chapel at Tor Vergata (1999).

Alongside his design practice, he led research projects for the Ministry of Public Education and the National Research Council (CNR) on topics related to architectural composition and history. A member of the Accademia di San Luca, he played an active role in national and international architectural discourse, participating in conferences, exhibitions (including the Venice Biennale and the Milan Triennial), and publishing essays and books. Among these are two studies dedicated to the Jesuit architect Andrea Pozzo, as well as contributions to the urban history of Rome, such as La piazza del Quirinale (1973) and Itinerari per Roma (1985).

His personal archive is housed at the MAXXI Museum in Rome.

== Sources ==
- Conforti, Claudia; Dal Co, Francesco (1986). Vittorio De Feo. Opere e progetti. Milan: Electa.
- De Seta, Cesare (1981). L'architettura del Novecento. Turin: UTET.
- Ippolito, Achille Maria; Pagnotta, Mauro (1982). Roma costruita. Le vicende, le problematiche e le realizzazioni dell'architettura a Roma dal 1946 al 1981. Rome: Palombi. p. 98.
- De Guttry, Irene (1989). Guida di Roma moderna dal 1870 ad oggi. Rome: De Luca. p. 124.
- Polano, Sergio (1991). Guida all'architettura italiana del Novecento. Milan: Electa. p. 579.
- Rossi, Piero Ostilio (1984). Roma. Guida all'architettura moderna (1909-1984). Bari: Laterza. pp. 250–251, 271–272.
