= Vittorio Bongiorno =

Italian writer and musician

- Born: 1973 (age 52–53); Palermo, Italy
- Website: http://vittoriobongiorno.blogspot.it/

Vittorio Bongiorno (born Palermo, 1973) is an Italian writer and musician.

== Biography ==
Vittorio Bongiorno debuted quite young with the novel La Giovane Holding, the psychedelic noir In Paradiso (DeriveApprodi, 2001), and the Bildungsroman Il Bravo Figlio (Rizzoli, 2006), receiving rave reviews by Fernanda Pivano in the Corriere della Sera newspaper. The novel Il Duka in Sicilia was published by Einaudi Stile libero in 2011.

He wrote the screenplays Il Duka (Sacher Prize, 2003), which was published as a short story in Alias, the weekly supplement to Il Manifesto newspaper, and Alma (prize for Best Screenplay at BAFF 2010). He has written and directed music videos and documentaries: Buia era la Notte (Dark Was The Night, 2010) and Songs With Other Strangers (2010).

He contributes to music magazines Il Mucchio Selvaggio and Mucchio Extra, which released in 2014 the two music reportages Los Angeles: the sound of the desert and The sound of Berlin. In January 2015 Mucchio Extra released the reportage The sound of Detroit.

In 2012 he produced a musical reading of Il Duka in Italy and New York, and in 2013 he performed the new musical novel No Strangers Blues, reading pages of the book and playing a self-built cigar box guitar as used in Mississippi Delta blues.

Vittorio Bongiorno lives in Bologna.
