= Angelo Nocchiero =

Sculpture by Giovanni Scanzi

L'Angelo Nocchiero, 'The Angel-Helmsman' is a marble sculpture in the symbolist style by Genovese sculptor Giovanni Scanzi, completed in 1886. It was commissioned by Giacomo Carpaneto, Cav. Mauriziano (1811–1878) as a monument for his family tomb in the Monumental Cemetery of Staglieno in Genova, Italy. Along with the sculpture for the Oneto Family sculpted by Giulio Monteverde in 1882, the Carpaneto monument has become one of the most recognisable icons of Staglieno, appearing on an official cemetery brochure in 2014. Famous people of the 19th century visited Staglieno and commented on the work, which depicts an angel, standing astride a small boat, beginning to secure the sails at the end of a journey.

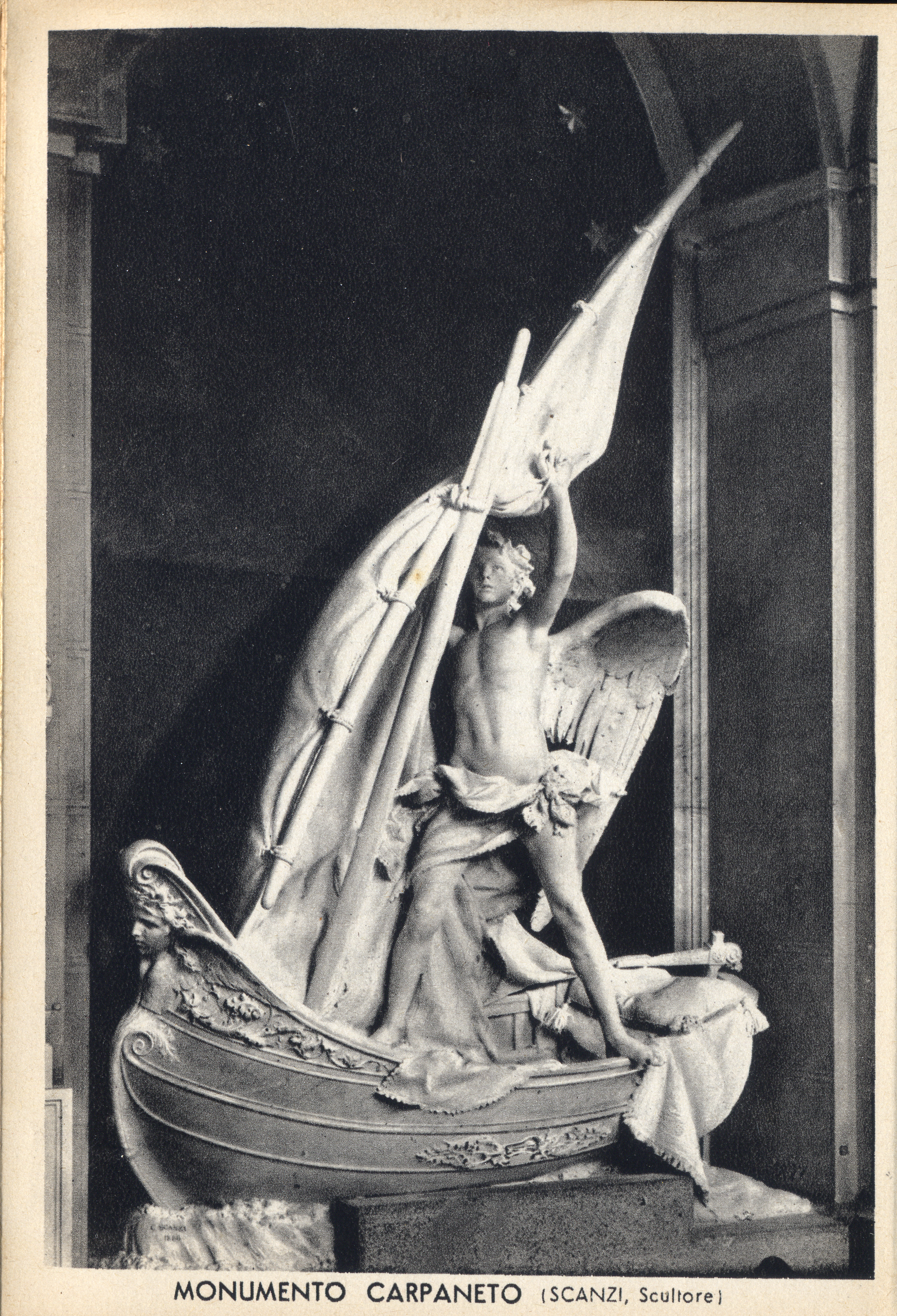
Angelo Nocchiero (1886), Giovanni Scanzi, sculptor (early photograph, ca.1895)

== Description ==
L'Angelo Nocchiero is a marble sculpture completed in 1886 by the Genovese sculptor Giovanni Scanzi (1840–1915). It is in the symbolist style. The work was commissioned by Giacomo Carpaneto, Cav. Mauriziano (1811–1878) as a monument for his family tomb in the Monumental Cemetery of Staglieno in Genova, Italy.

== The artist, his patron, and his model ==
Giovanni Scanzi was 38 years old when his patron Cav. Giacomo Carpaneto died, and he began work on the Carpaneto family tomb at Staglieno. Scanzi's early work was in the Realist style, and by this time he had also incorporated Symbolism (or, perhaps more accurately, "l'iperdecorativismo eclettico"), as seen in his sculptures of the Angelo della Resurrezione (Angel of Resurrection) on the Carlo di G.B. Casella family tomb (1877), the later relief for the tomb of Elisa Falcone (1893), and other works at Staglieno.

Giacomo Carpaneto, Cav. Mauriziano (1811–1878) was a respected merchant, part of a family originally from Sampierdarena (S. Petri ad Arenaria) where the Palazzo Centurione-Carpaneto still stands. Signora Carpaneto also is interred in the family tomb.

The model for the Angelo Nocchiero sculpture was Antonio Dellapiane (1868–1942). After school, he worked as a shop-boy in a joiner's workshop in Sampierdarena, where Scanzi met him. Later, he started his own workshop, becoming a successful carpenter and wood carver.

== Symbolism ==
The sculpture depicts an angel, standing astride a small boat, beginning to secure the sails at the end of a journey. His garments are streaming behind him, suggesting a strong wind. The prow of the boat is the stoic face of a woman, and under the prow the water swirls. Ropes are coiled in minute detail inside the boat (even though the average cemetery visitor would not be able to see them), and at the back of the boat is an embroidered cushion, slightly dented from a head resting there until a moment earlier.

The boat would be a familiar symbol to anyone in 19th century Genova, a seaport town, and the Angelo Nocchiero—Angel Helmsman—reminds the viewer of the spiritual boatmen of ancient mythology, whose job it was to transport the departed into the afterlife. The imagery of the Guiding Angel is underscored by the epigraph in bronze lettering on the pedestal: "AVVENTURATO CHI NEL MARE DELLA VITA EBBE NOCCHIERO SÌ FIDO" - "Blessed is he who on the sea of life had so sure a guide".

== History ==
Many famous people of the 19th century visited Staglieno, including Friedrich Nietzsche, Guy de Maupassant, and Mark Twain, who wrote about it in glowing terms in his Innocents Abroad (1868). The visit in March 1893 of Empress Elisabeth of Austria, fondly known as "Sissi", is legendary. Periodicals of the time reported that she arrived incognito as "Lady Parker", and walked from the Principe to Staglieno, visiting a number of significant places along the way. When she came before Scanzi's Nocchiero, she paused, apparently moved, and after a period of contemplation, had the epigraph copied into her personal notebook. Along with the sculpture for the Oneto Family sculpted by Giulio Monteverde in 1882, the Carpaneto monument has become one of the most recognisable icons of Staglieno, appearing on an official cemetery brochure in 2014.

=== Restoration ===
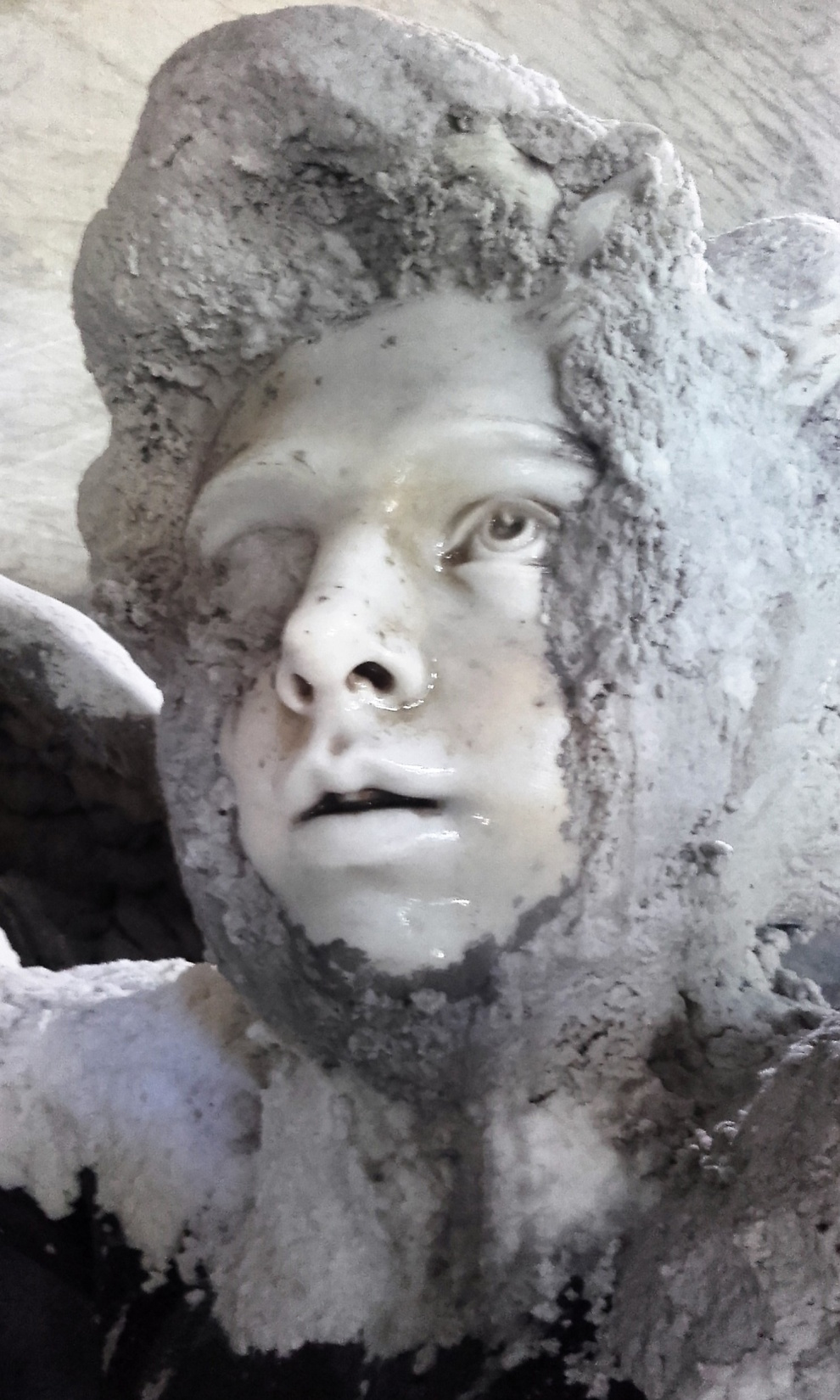
Angelo Nocchiero (1886), during the 2016 restoration process

Mark Twain described the monuments at Staglieno as "exquisitely wrought . . . full of grace and beauty. They are new, and snowy; every outline is perfect." After a century and a half, Twain's description would not be quite the same, as the dust, mildew, and pollution of an industrial city settled on the marble surfaces, thieves have removed valuable bronze and other materials, and vandals have broken or otherwise defaced some of the monuments.

Through the work of local restoration experts and societies and individuals dedicated to the preservation of "the largest outdoor sculpture museum in Europe", Scanzi's Angelo Nocchiero underwent a complete restoration in 2016. Beginning with a spolveratura—the removal of dust to allow a complete assessment of the restoration work necessary—local experts worked for several months to remove the effects of time and abuse.

== Gallery ==
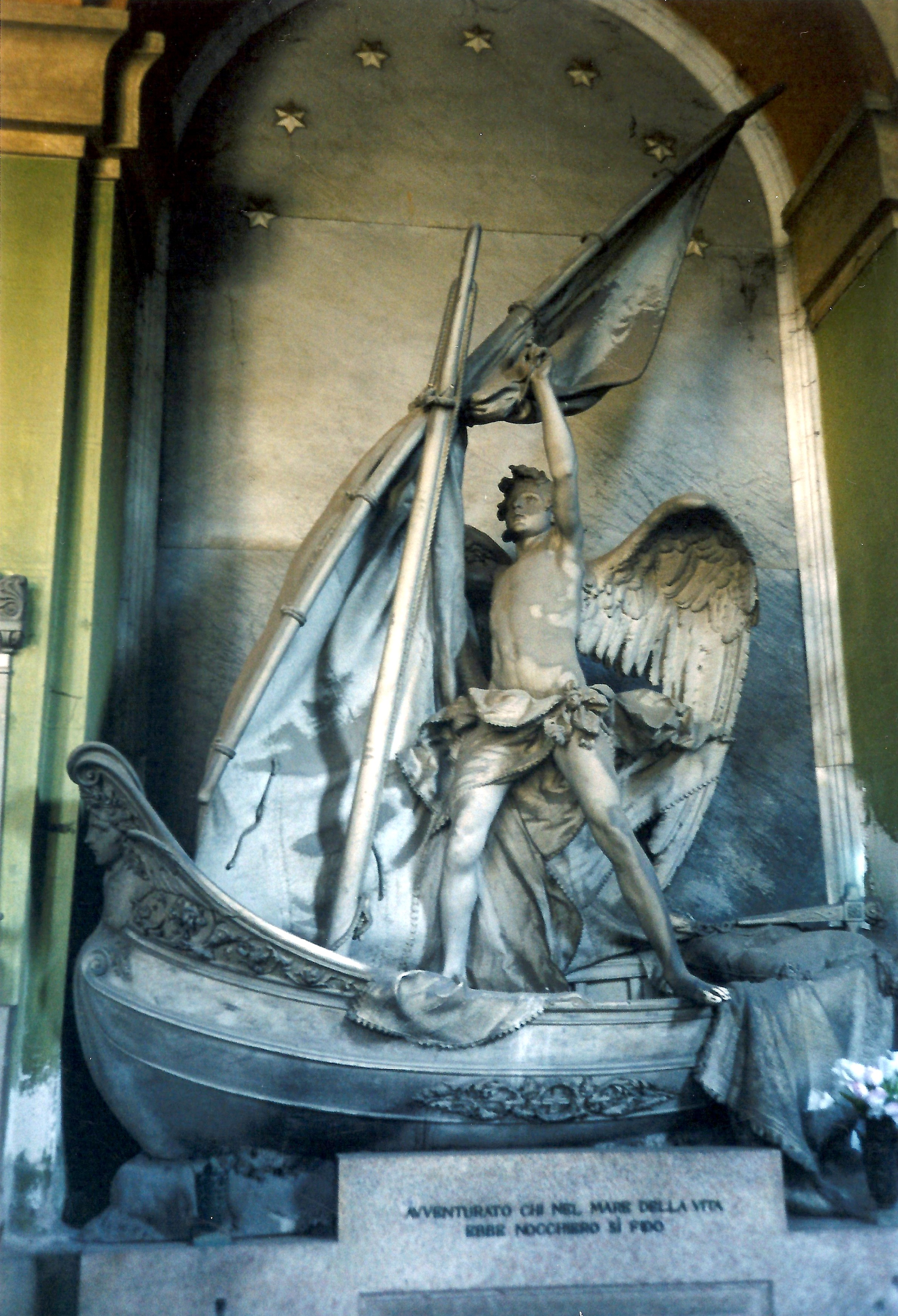
L'Angelo Nocchiero in 2010, before restoration

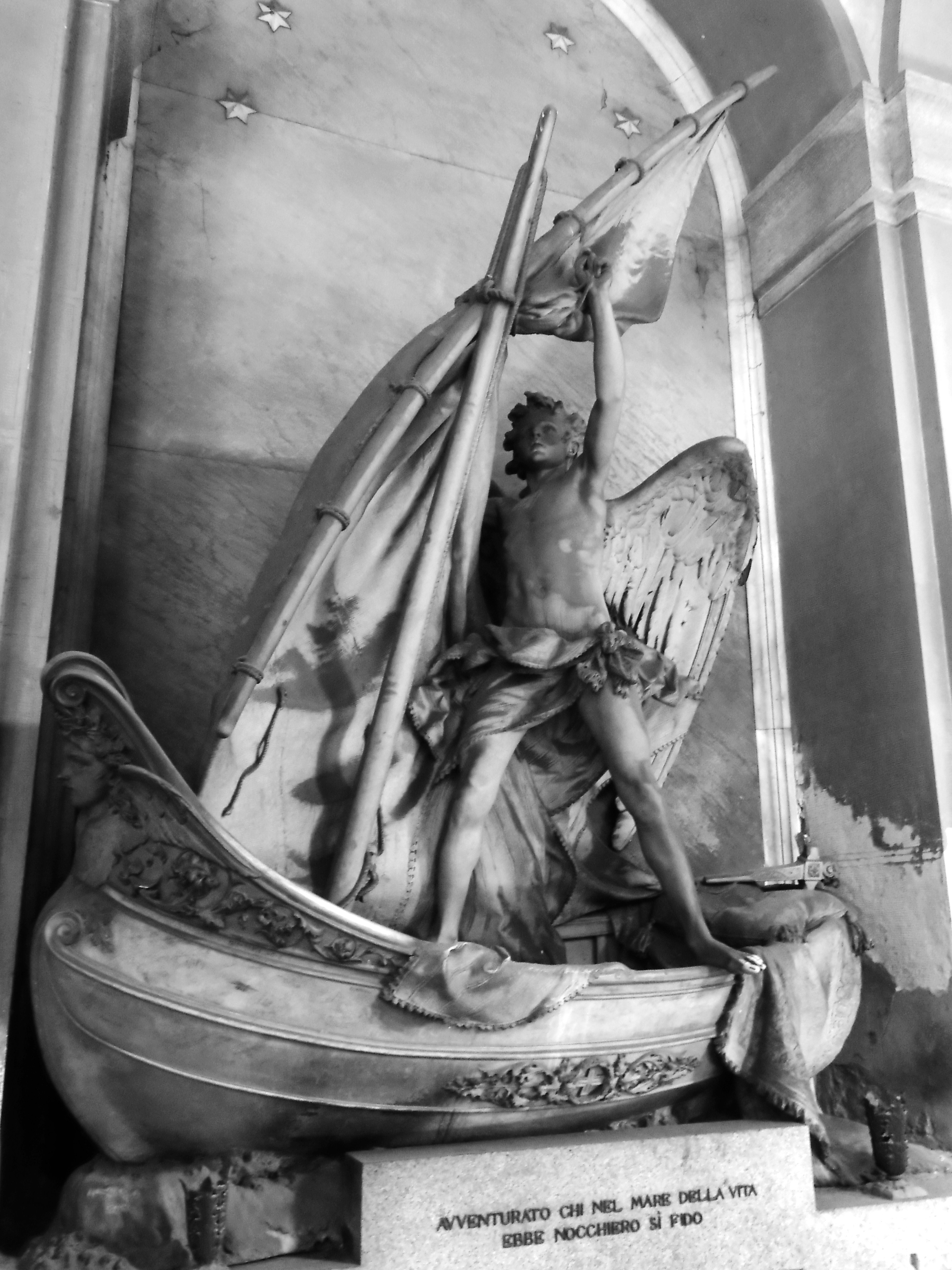
L'Angelo Nocchiero in 2014, before restoration (monochrome image)

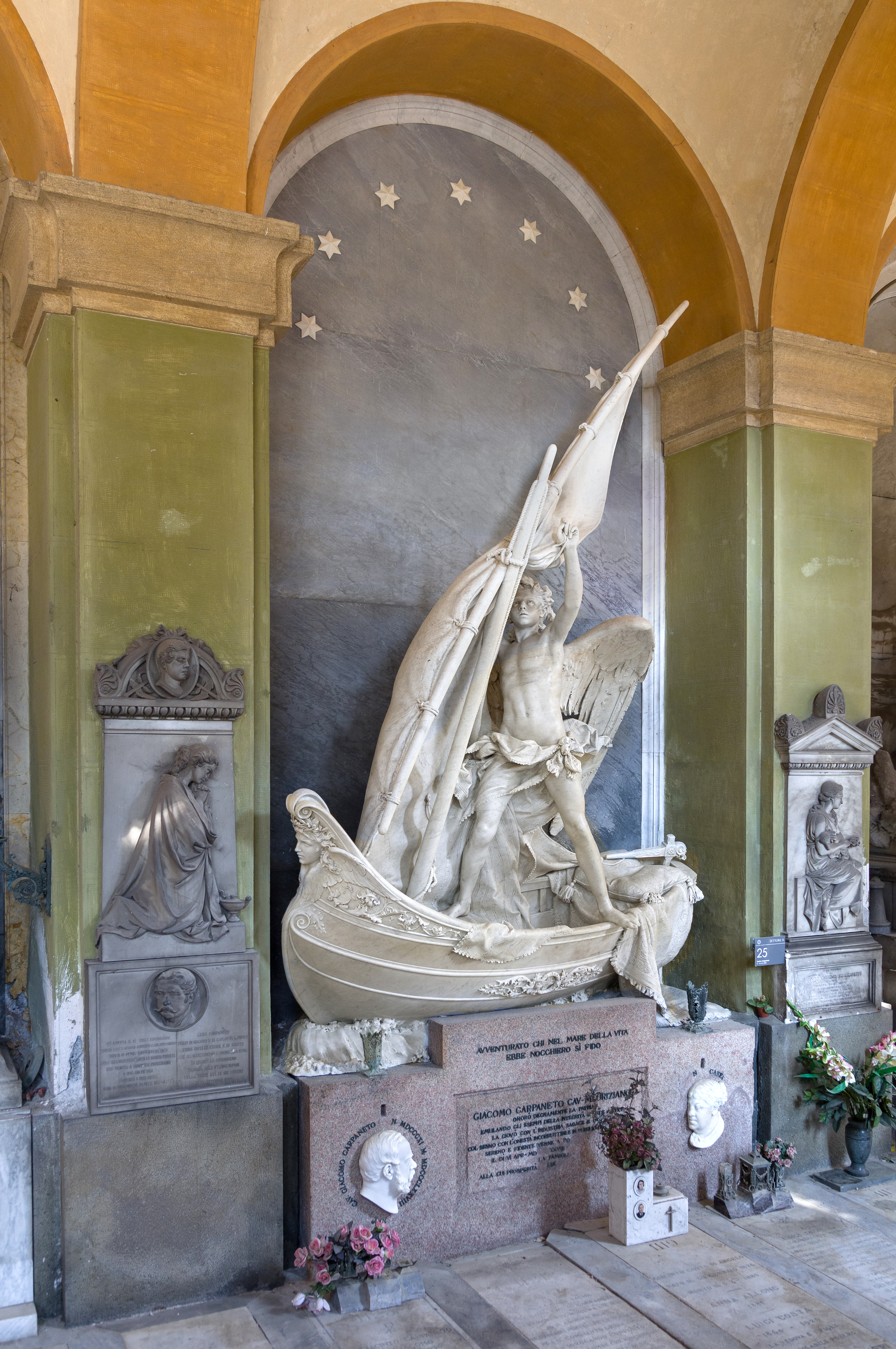
L'Angelo Nocchiero in 2017, after restoration (full view of niche)

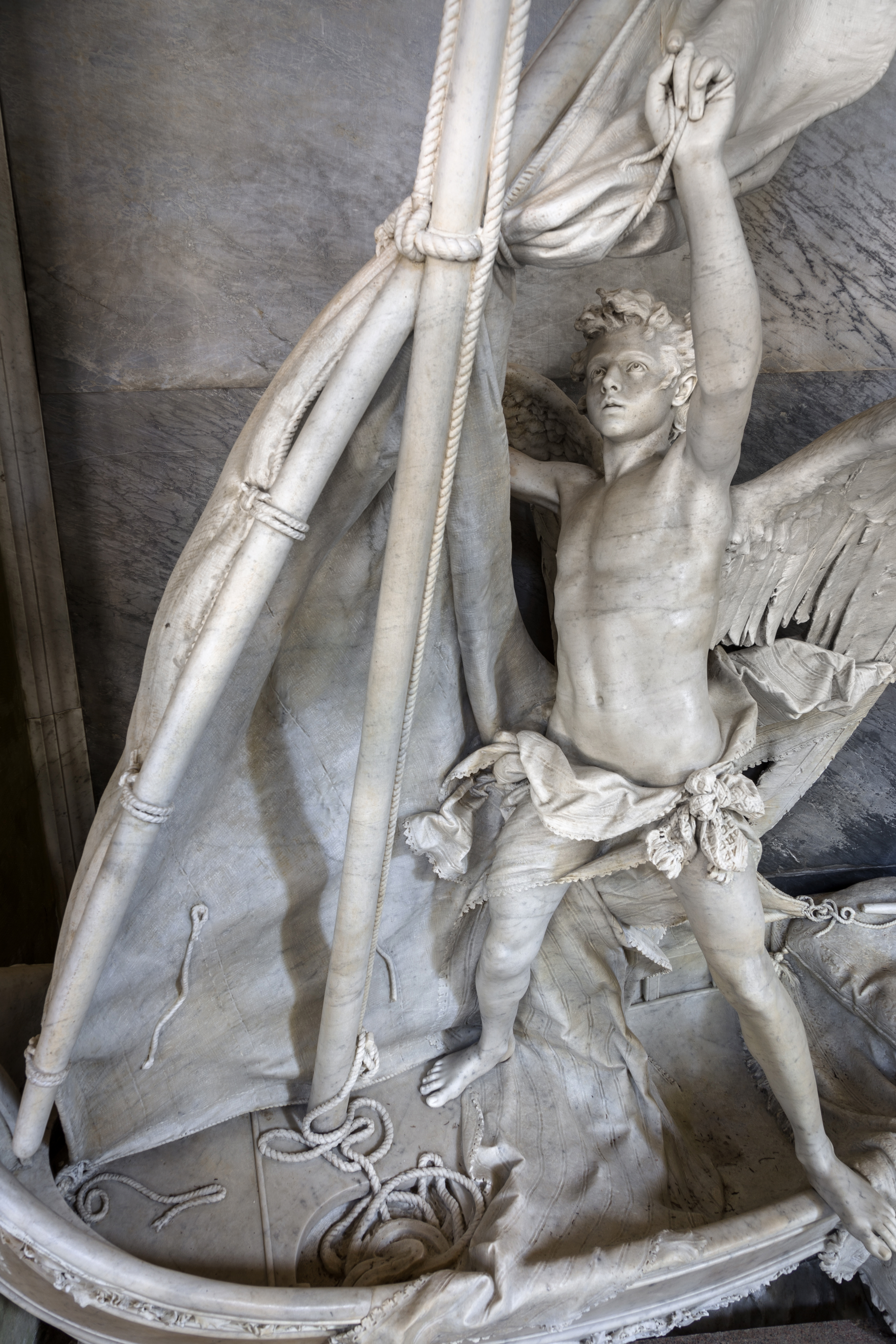
L'Angelo Nocchiero in 2017, after restoration (view of Angel standing in boat)

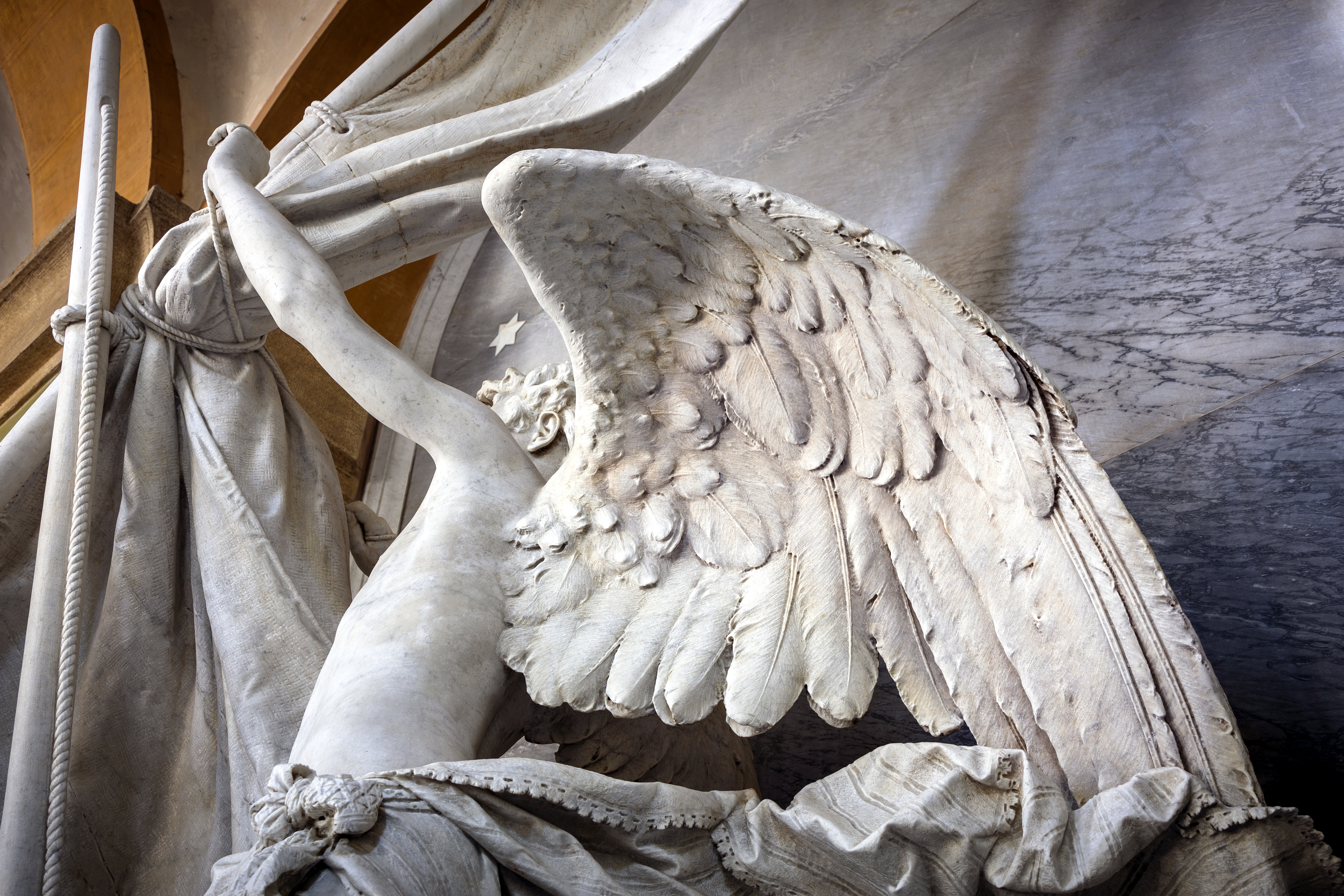
L'Angelo Nocchiero in 2017, after restoration (detail of Angel's left wing)

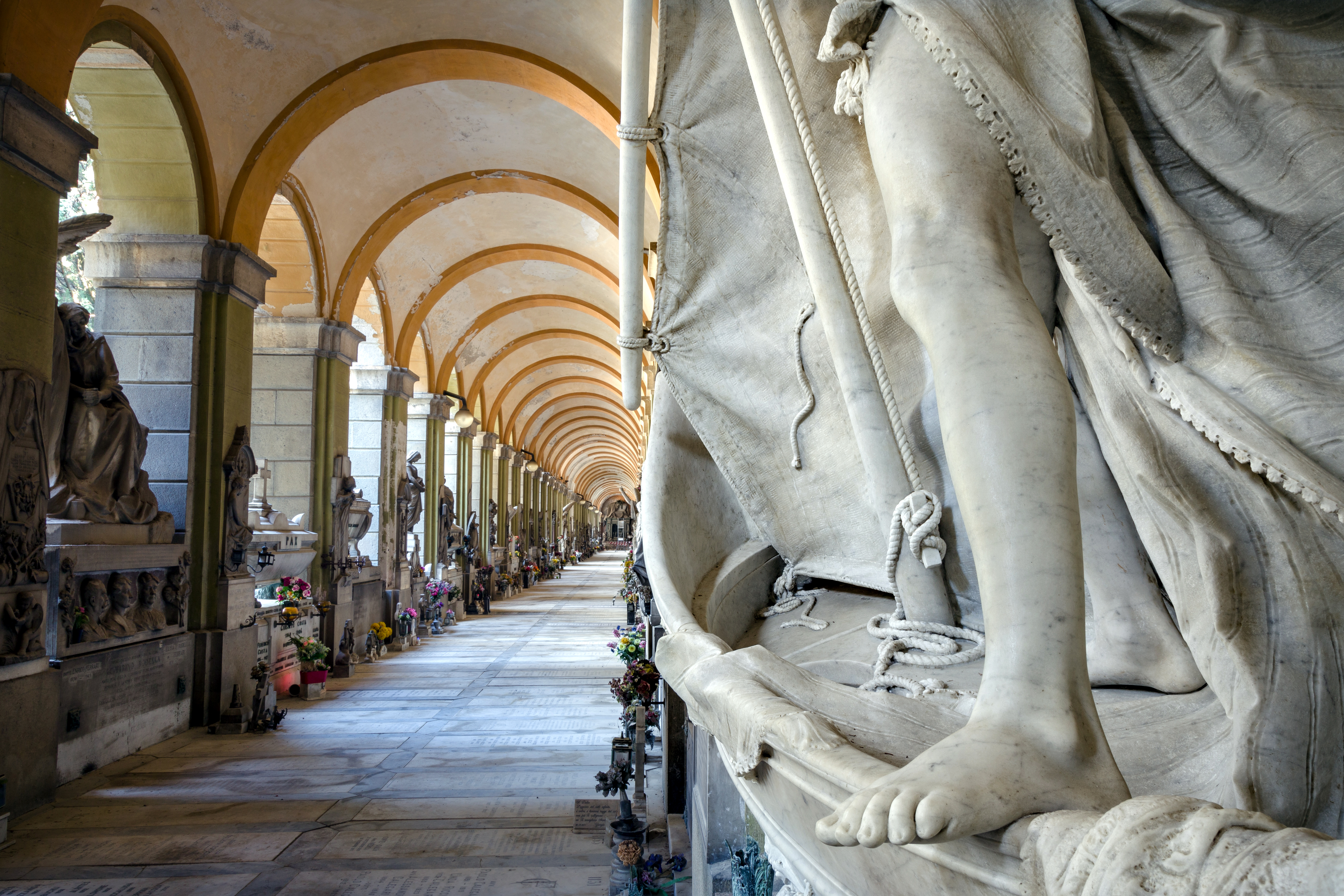
view of East section of Porticato Inferiore (Settore A) at Staglieno, from foot of Carpaneto monument

== See also ==
- Monumental Cemetery of Staglieno
- Giovanni Scanzi (Italian Wikipedia page)

== Bibliography ==
- Fratelli Alinari. (1913) Riproduzioni fotografiche: Liguria, Piemonte, Lombardia, Alpi marittime e canton Ticino. Firenze: G. Barbèra
- Walter S. Arnold. (2009) Staglieno: The Art of the Marble Carver. Cincinnati: Edgecliff Press ISBN 978-0-9819271-4-5
- Gianni Berenco Gardin and Gabriella Nesso Parlato. (1993). Il Giardino del Tempo. [Roma:] Peliti Associati ISBN 88-85121-18-7
- Lee Friedlander. (2002) Staglieno. Tucson, Arizona: Nazraeli Press ISBN 1-59005-039-8
- Rita Nello Marchetti. (2014). Caterina e l'Angelo: Il volto popolare e l'anima nobile del Cimitero di Staglieno. Genova: Erga edizioni ISBN 88-8163-832-0
- F[erdinando]. Resasco. (1904) Staglieno Camposanto. Milano: Stabilimenti Menotti Bassani & C.
- Maurice Rheims. (1977) 19th Century Sculpture. New York: H.N. Abrams ISBN 0-8109-0375-X
- Franco Sborgi. (1997). Staglieno e la Scultura Funeraria Ligure tra Ottocento e Novecento.
- Torino: Artema ISBN 88-8052-009-1
