= Giovanni Scanzi =

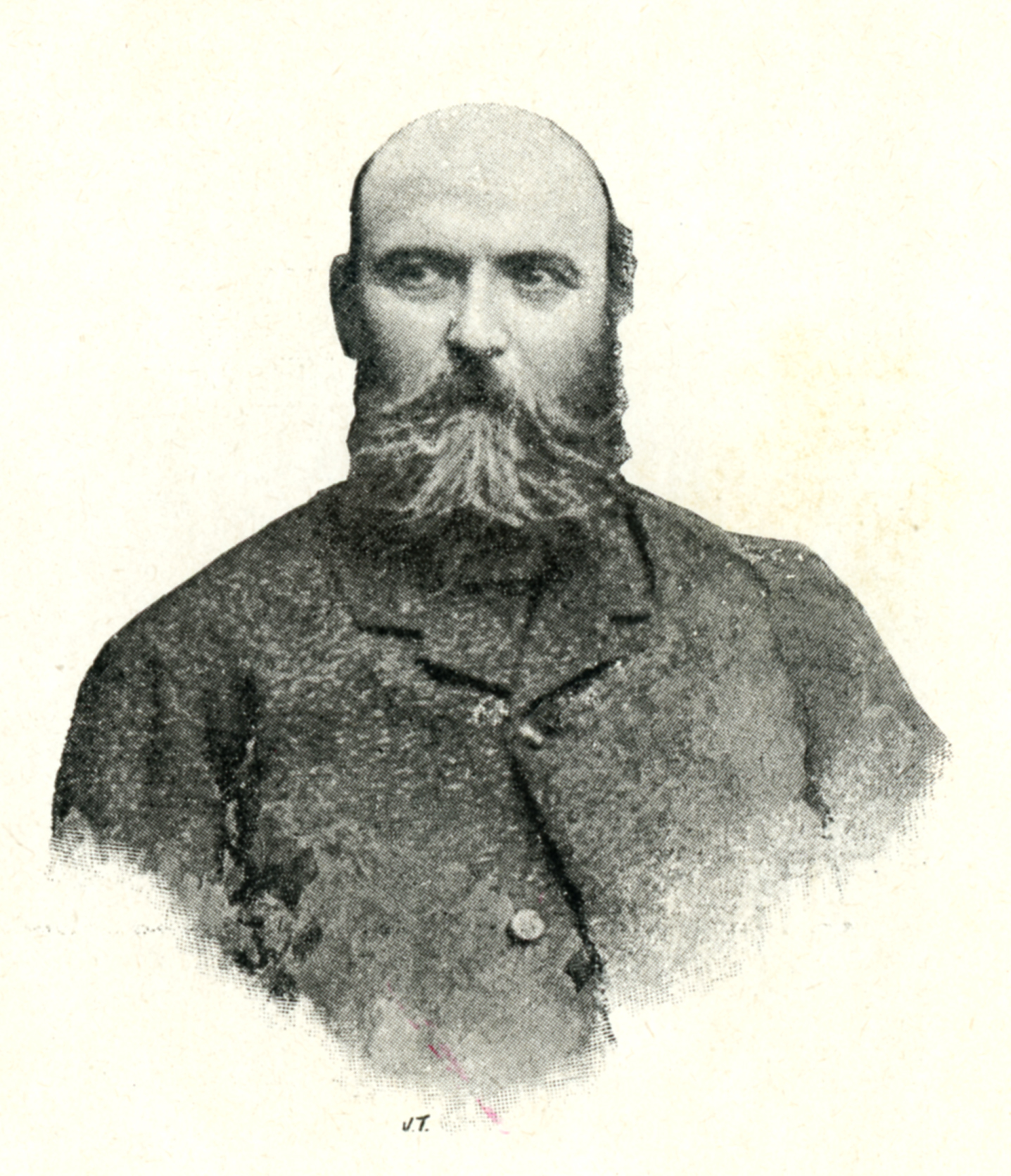
- Giovanni Scanzi, c.1895
- Born: February 23, 1840; Genoa
- Died: 15 April 1915 (aged 75); Genoa
- Resting place: Monumental Cemetery of Staglieno, Genoa, Italy
- Notable work: Angelo Nocchiero

Giovanni Scanzi (23 February 1840 – 15 April 1915) was an Italian sculptor. His early apprenticeship led to formal studies in Rome, followed by a career as a prolific artist and teacher. He was particularly active creating monuments for the Monumental Cemetery of Staglieno in Genoa, with many other works located in museums, churches and public venues in Genoa and elsewhere.

== Biography ==
Giovanni Scanzi was born in Genoa in 1840. At the age of 12, he entered the workshop of sculptor Santo Varni, where he began dusting statues and gradually developed his skills. Varni was a professor at the Accademia Ligustica, and encouraged his protégé at the beginning of his studies. In 1863 Scanzi won the Durazzo Prize, which gave him the opportunity to go to Rome to continue his studies. There he met Giulio Monteverde, also the winner of the Rome prize. From 1879 to 1892, Scanzi was a professor at the Accademia Ligustica. Luigi Brizzolara, Eugenio Baroni and Francesco Messina were among his students.

Scanzi's works can be found throughout Genoa, including public areas, the Basilica of Santa Maria Immacolata, the Church of the Sacred Heart and San Giacomo of Carignano and other churches. The Monumental Cemetery of Staglieno contains about 50 monuments created by Scanzi, including the tombs of Carlo di G.B. Casella (1877), Giacomo Carpaneto (1886), Elisa Falcone (Cippo No.1024, 1893) and Giacomo Pastorino (1896).

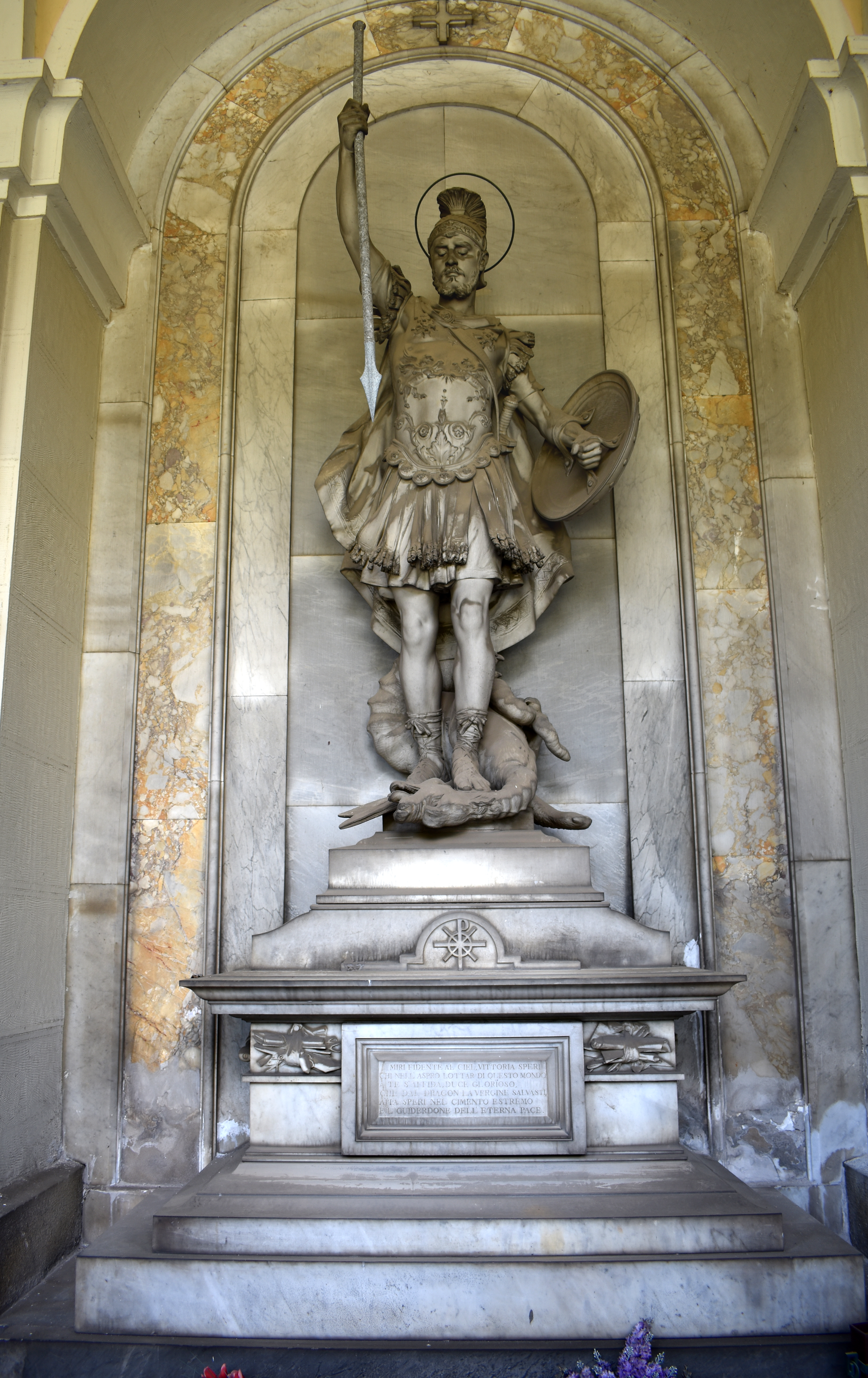
Tomb of Giovanni Scanzi, Staglieno, Genoa (sculpted by Scanzi himself, 1897)

Giovanni Scanzi died in Genoa on 15 April 1915.

== Major works ==
Sources: (Note: The list of works outside of Staglieno derives mainly from "Giovanni Scanzi, scultore", an article originally published on mpigreco.altervista.org, signed by "M.P., 2004", and retrieved on 4 July 2017. An earlier version of the article on the same site was signed "Giuseppe Giovanni Battista Cattaneo", an independent scholar based in Italy. The article contains an extensive list of references. This article is now located at: www.mpopus.it/public/miscellanea/scanzi.html (retrieved April 25, 2021).)

=== Genoa ===
==== Accademia Ligustica ====
- Busto di ragazza - Terracotta
- Giacomo Borgonovo - Busto, gesso
- Madonna delle Vigne - 2 bronzi. Studi per l'esemplare definitivo in argento inviato a Benedetto XV
- Busto di donna - Terracotta

==== Albergo dei poveri ====
- G. Polleri

==== Biblioteca Berio ====
- Ritratto di bambina
- L'orfana

==== Galleria dell'Arte Moderna, Musei di Nervi ====
- Come son contenta - 1884

==== Giardini dell'Acquasola ====
- Busto di Martin Piaggio - Viale 3 novembre

==== Ospedale di Pammattone ====
- B. Centurione

==== Villetta di Negro ====
- G.C. Abba

==== Già Circolo Filologico ====
- G. Leopardi

==== Palazzo Tursi ====
- Giuseppina Tollot

==== Stazione marittima ====
- Colonna Commemorativa della Spedizione dei Mille - Inaugurato il 5 maggio 1910, Ponte dei Mille

==== Chiesa dell'Immacolata ====
- S. Giuseppe - Secondo altare destro
- Abramo - Secondo altare destro
- David - Secondo altare destro
- S. Giorgio - Facciata (replica nella tomba di famiglia)
- Vergine - Cupola

==== Chiesa di San Giacomo di Carignano ====
- Statua del Sacro Cuore - Facciata, Bronzo dorato, 1912

==== Cimitero di Staglieno ====
- Giovanni Battista Barbieri - 1875 (Porticato Superiore ponente, cippo 172)
- Nicola Bertollo (Bertollo-Ferralasco) - 1915 (Prima Galleria Frontale, Nicchione IV)
- Giacomo Borgonovo - 1897 (Porticato Inferiore Levante, Nicchione XXXIX)
- Domenico Bozzano - 1875
- Angela Maria Capurro, Giuseppina Grillo - 1876
- Ada Carena - 1880 (Boschetto irregolare, Cippo 454)
- Giacomo Carpaneto - 1886 (Porticato Inferiore Levante, Nicchione CII)
- Carlo di G.B. Casella - 1877 (Porticato inferiore)
- Colomba Cassanello, vedova Bottaro - 1876 (Porticato Superiore Ponente, Cippo nº 208)
- Edoardo Cipollina - 1907
- Giuseppe Costa
- Giuseppina Palau Costa - 1878
- Luigi Croce - 1891
- Adelaide Dapino
- Della Torre - 1905
- Cesare Dellepiane
- Gerolamo Durazzo
- Elisa Falcone - 1893 (Porticato Inferiore Levante. Cippo nº 1024)
- Luigi Faveto - 1888 (Porticato Superiore Levante, Cippo nº 440)
- Giuseppe Ferraro - 1869
- Emanuele Ferrea - 1905
- Famiglia Ghilino - 1890 (Porticato Inferiore Levante, Nicchione CI)
- Giovanni Giazotto - 1898 (Porticato Inferiore Levante, Cippo nº 1367)
- G.B. Granara - 1882 (Porticato Superiore Levante. Cippo)
- Giuseppina Grillo - 1874 (Porticato Superiore Levante, N.XXI)
- Michele Lavagnino - 1905
- Michele Marré - 1884
- Grillo Vittoria Marré - 1870
- G.B. Montano - 1873
- Stanislao Morasso - 1906 (1902? Galleria semicircolare)
- Luigi Oviglio - 1903
- Luigi Parodi - 1914
- Giacomo Pastorino - 1896
- Agostino e Maria Pavese - 1866 (1885? Porticato superiore levante)
- Carlo Peri - 1900, Boschetto irregolare
- Ester Piaggio - 1885 (Porticato Superiore Levante, Nicchione XX)
- Tommaso Piccardo - 1904
- Bo Pasquale Podestà - 1875
- Alvigini Emilia Romanengo - 1900
- Scanzi - 1897 (Porticato Inferiore, Nicchione LXXXIV)
- Giuseppe Sebastiano - 1908
- G.B. Semino - 1878
- Antonio Villa - 1905
- Gianbattista Villa - 1903
- Wuy Calderoni (Porticato Inferiore Levante, Cippo nº 289)

=== Savona ===
==== Zinola ====
- Viglienzoni Angelo - 1911

=== Perugia ===
- Cesaroni

== Gallery ==
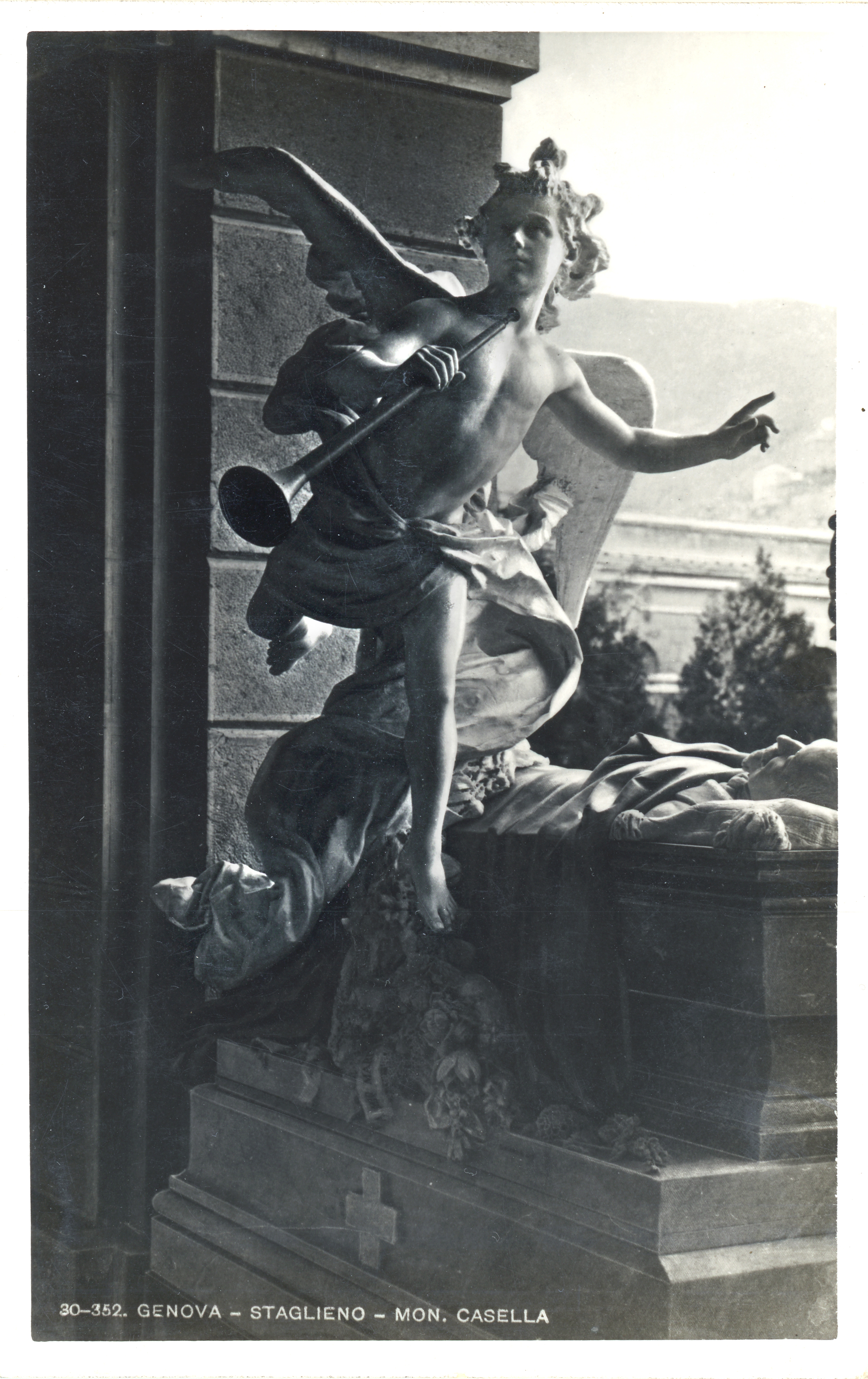
Tomb of Carlo di G.B. Casella, Staglieno, Genoa (early postcard image)

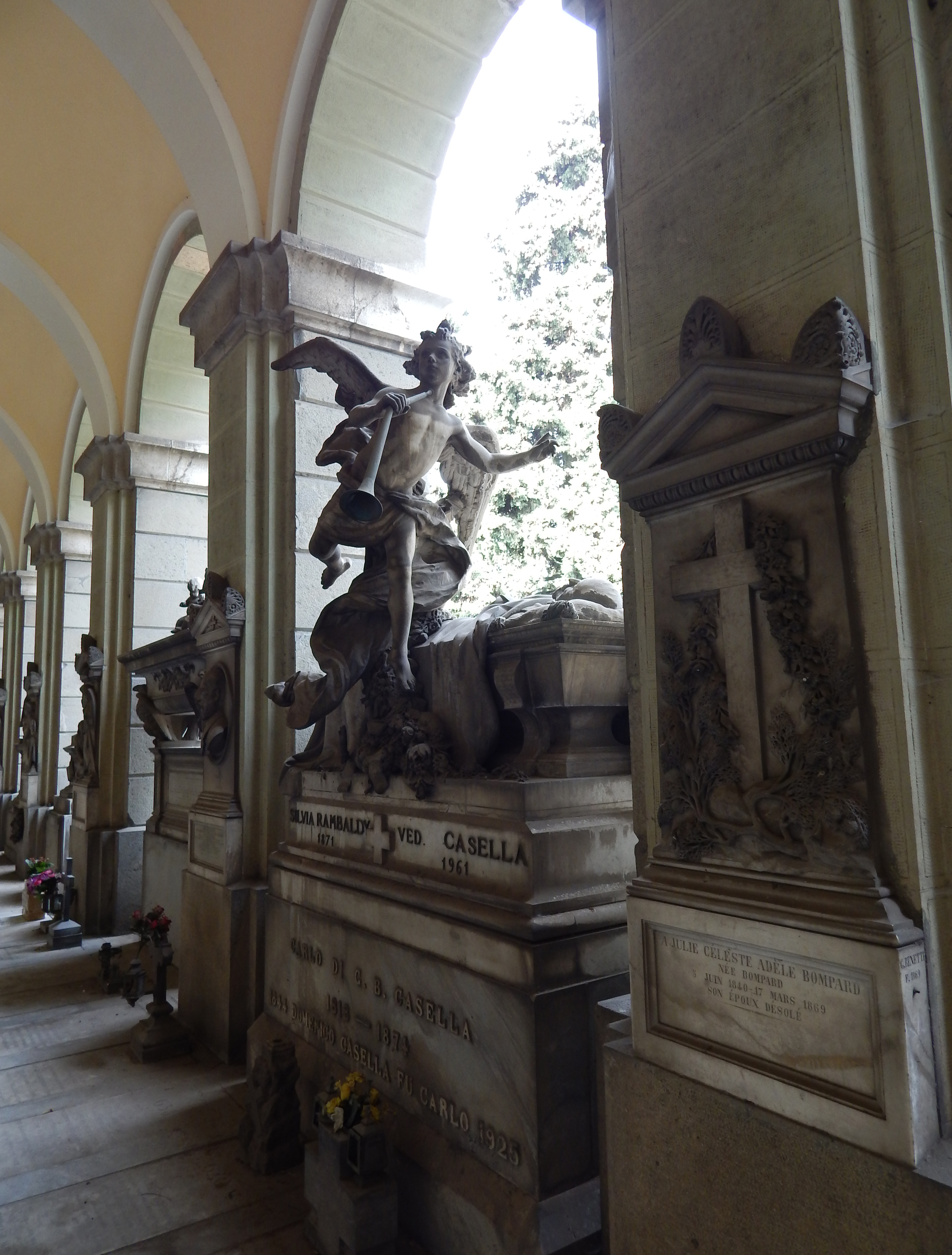
Tomb of Carlo di G.B. Casella, Staglieno, Genoa (before the 2018 restoration)

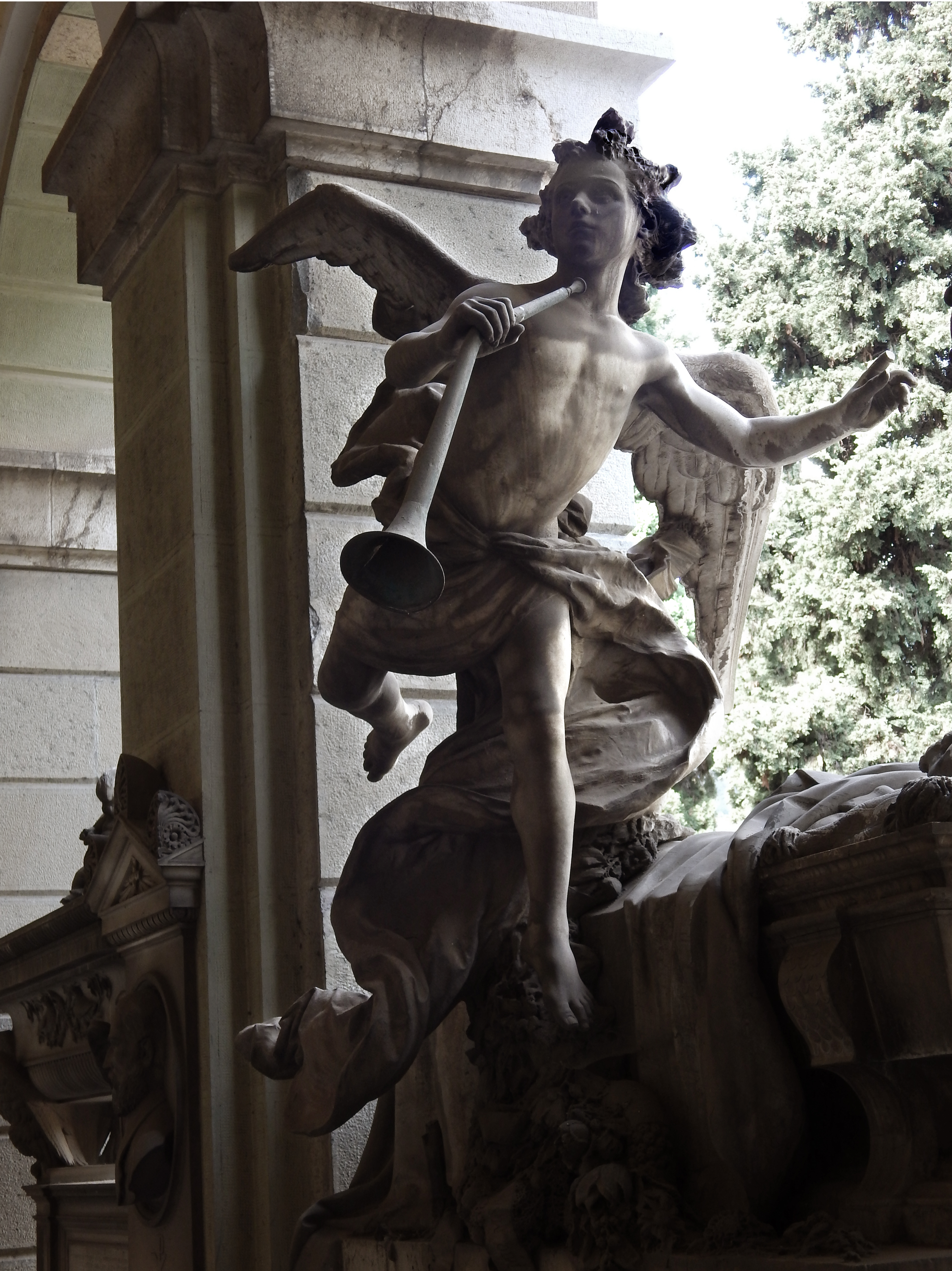
Tomb of Carlo di G.B. Casella, Staglieno, Genoa (before the 2018 restoration)

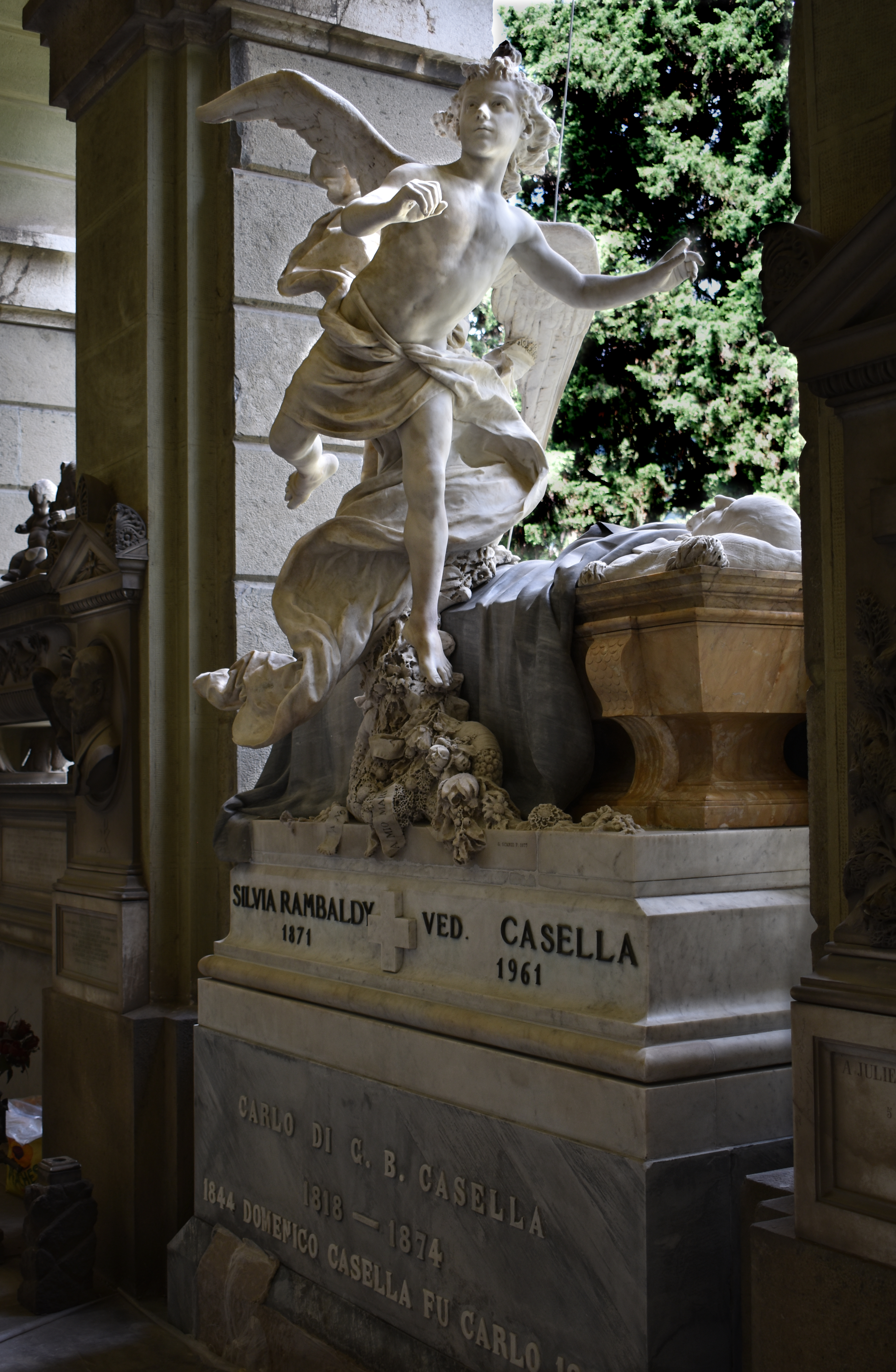
Tomb of Carlo di G.B. Casella, Staglieno, Genoa (after the 2018 restoration)

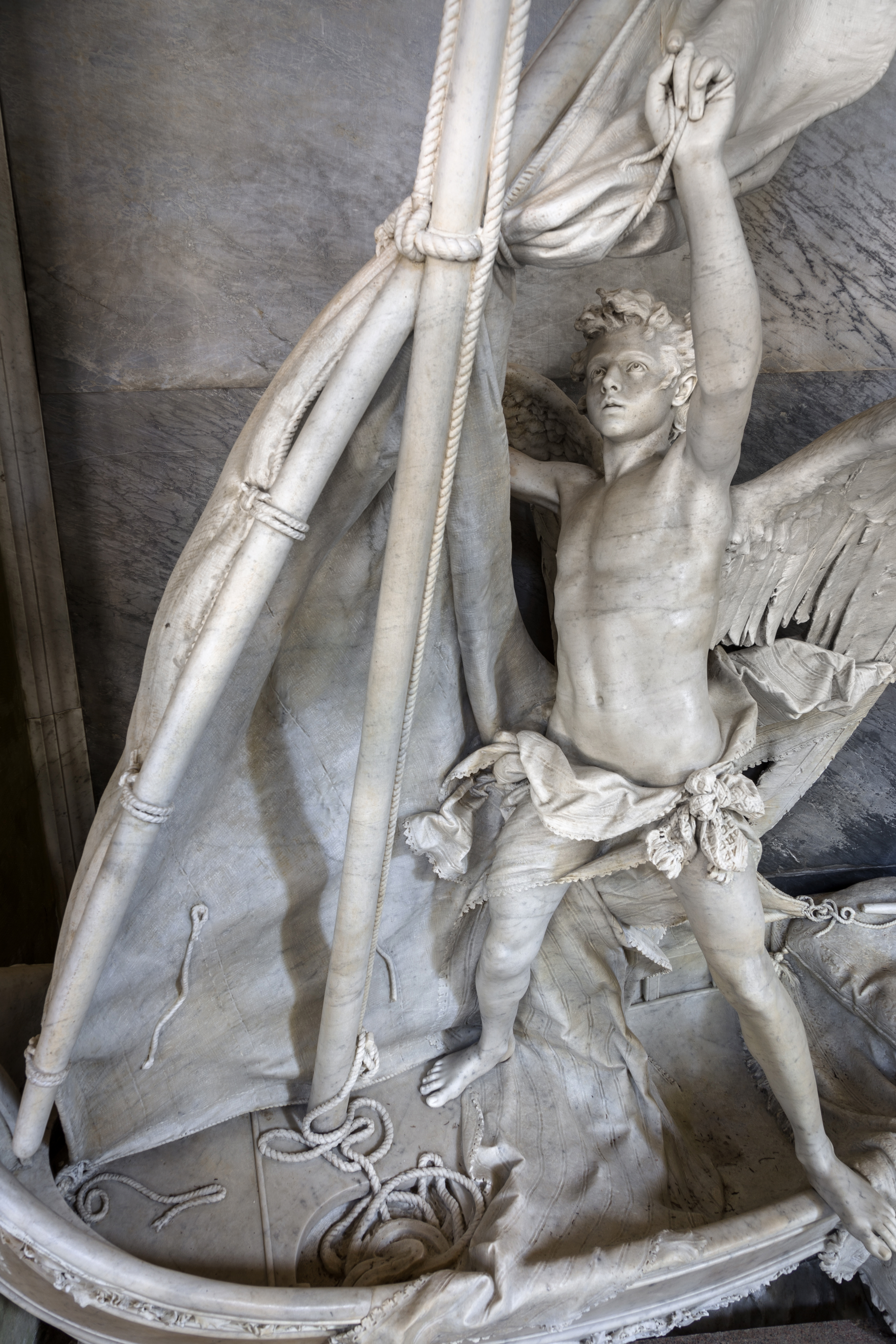
Angelo Nocchiero, Monument for the Carpaneto Family, Staglieno, Genoa (after the 2018 restoration)

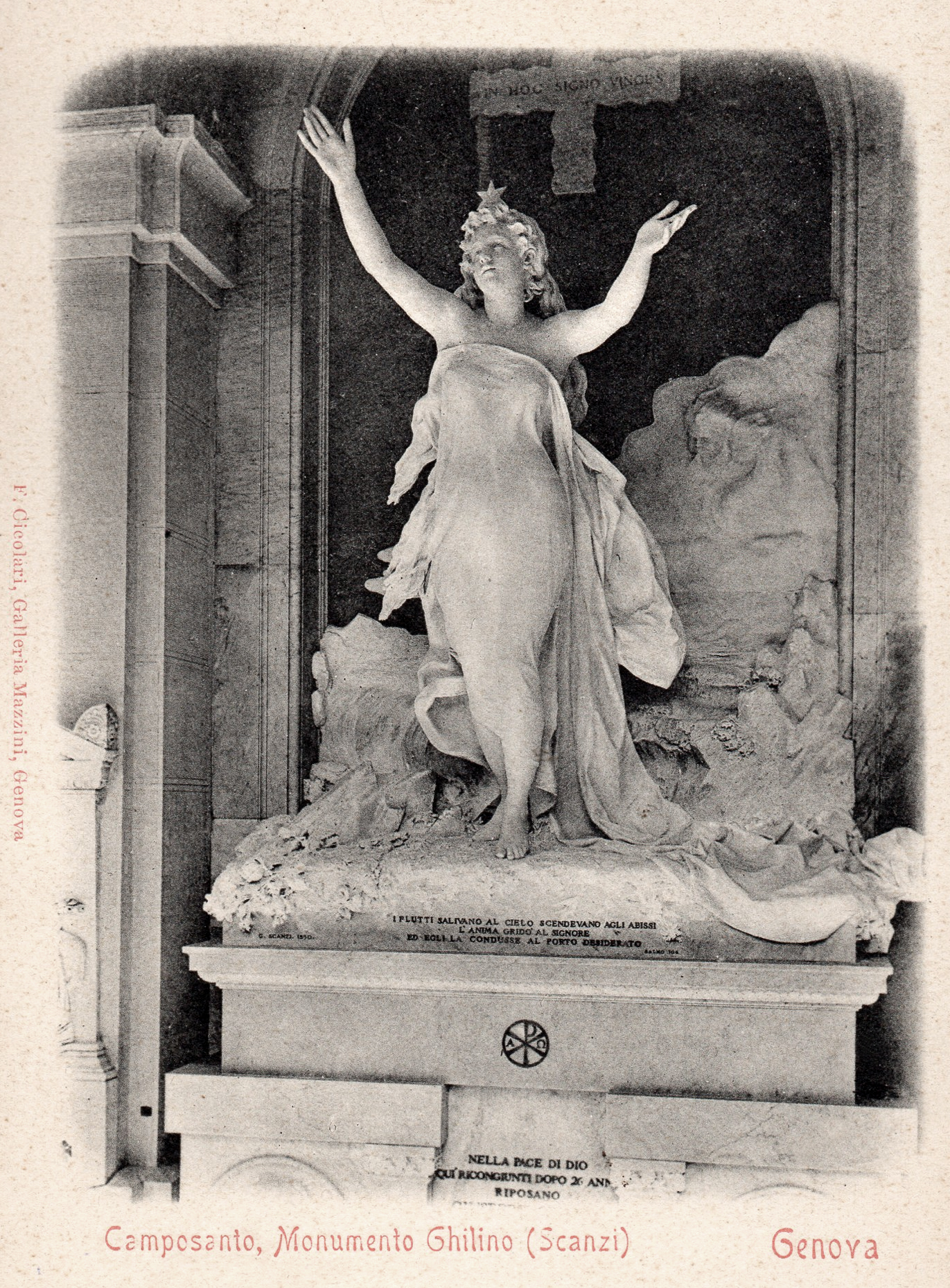
Monument for the Ghilino Family, Staglieno, Genoa (early photograph)

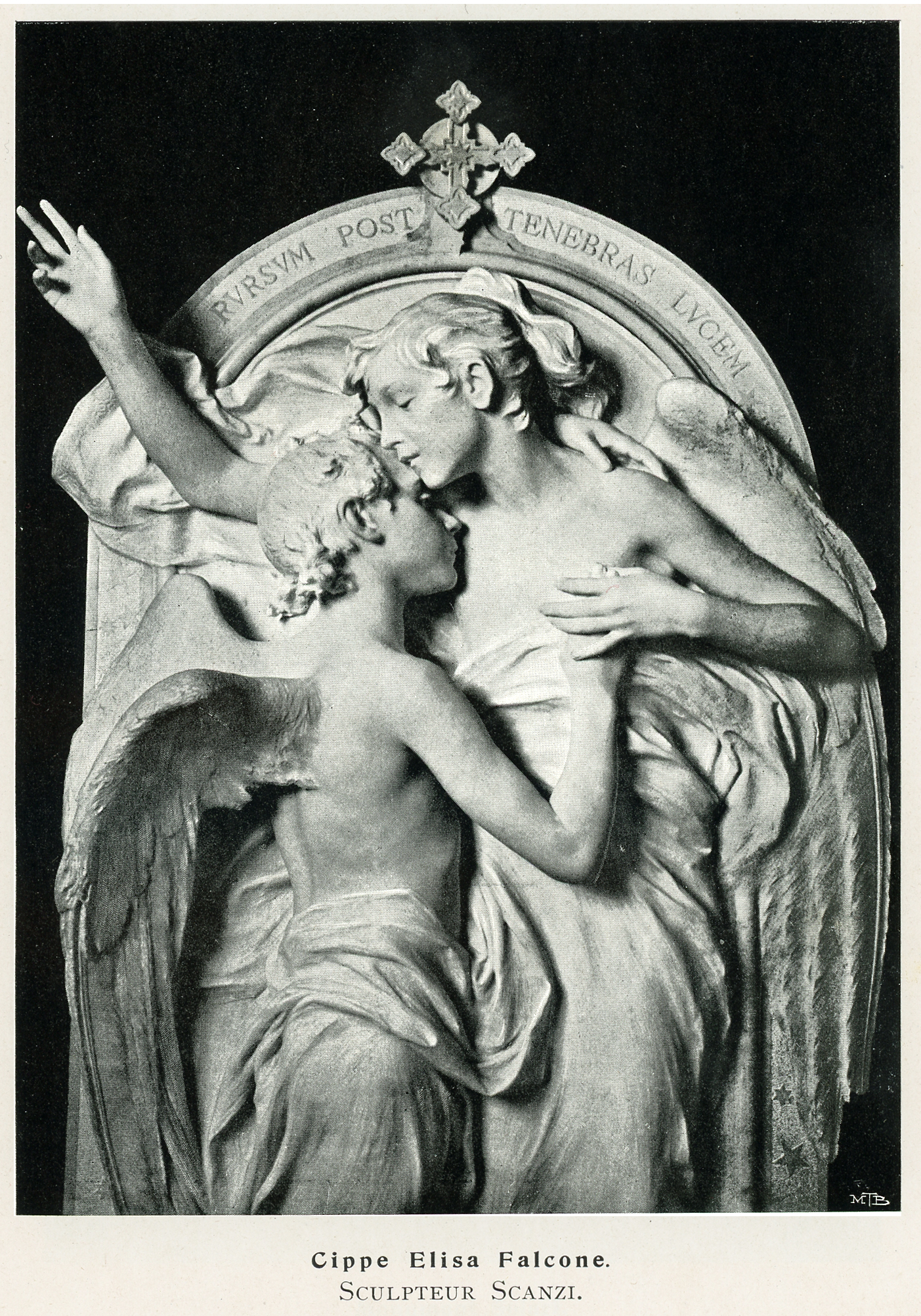
Memorial for Elisa Falcone, Staglieno, Genoa (artist's original plaster model)

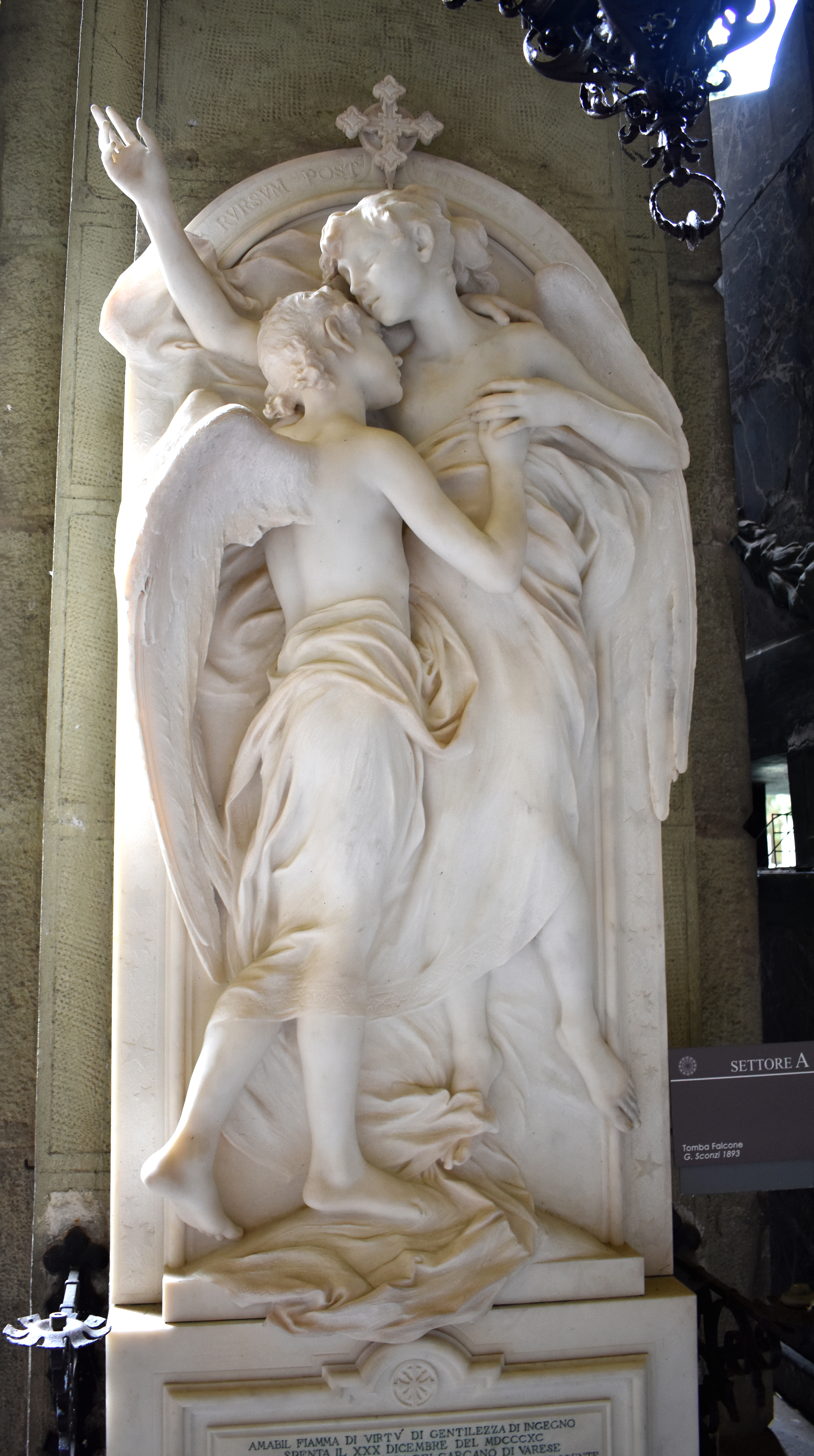
Memorial for Elisa Falcone, Staglieno, Genoa (after the 2017 restoration)

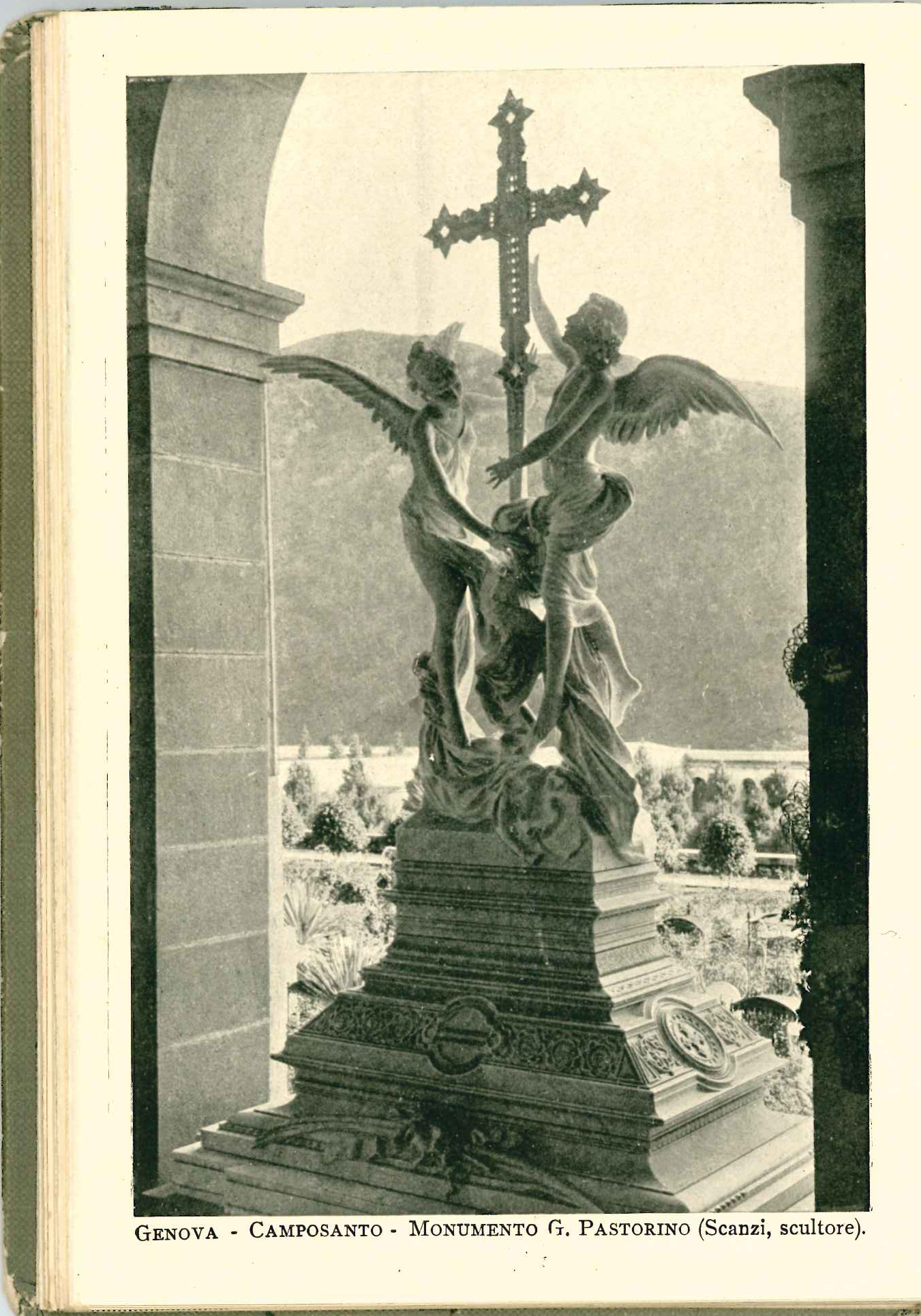
Monument for Giacomo Pastorino, Staglieno, Genoa (early photograph)

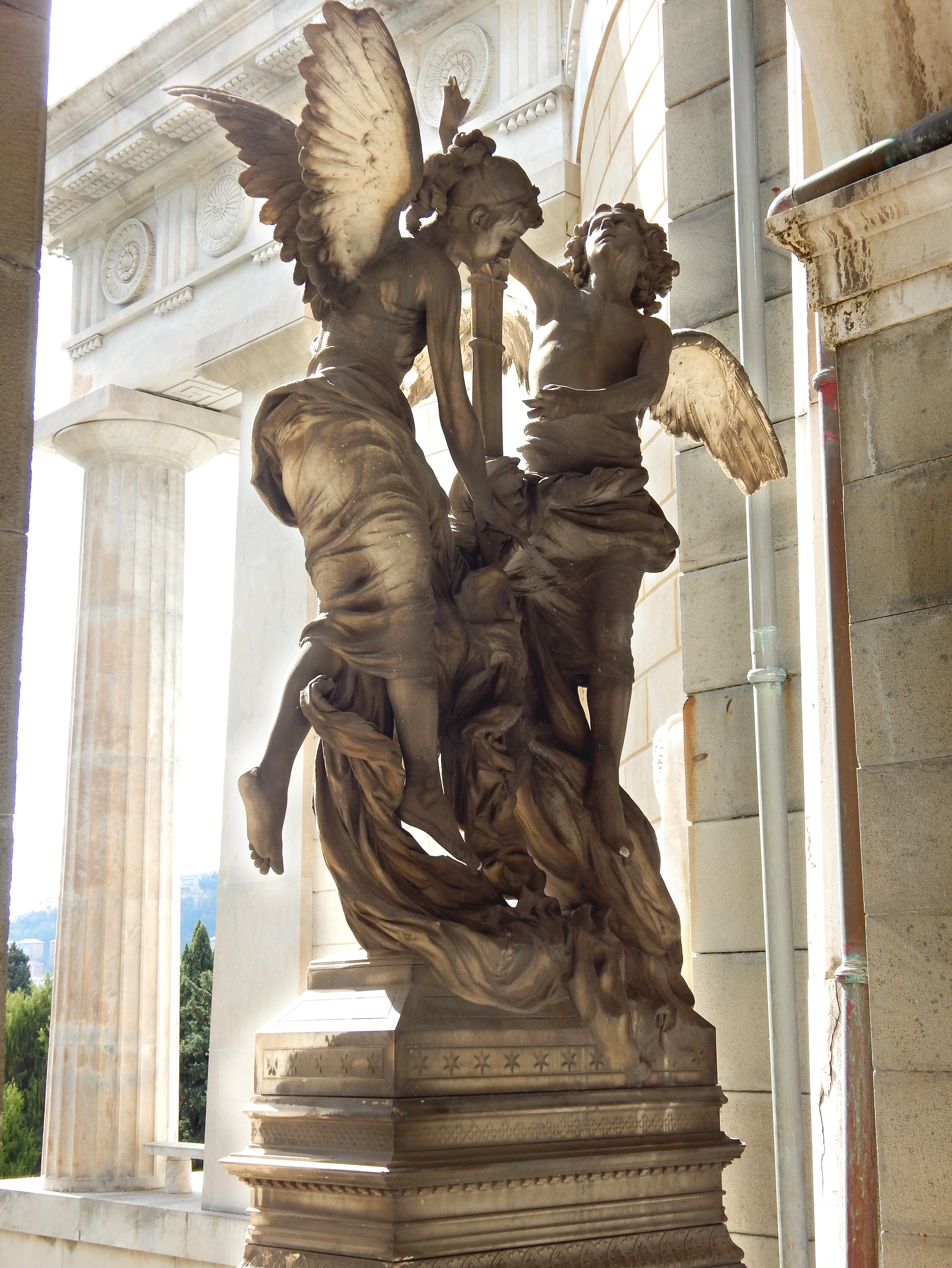
Monument for Giacomo Pastorino, Staglieno, Genoa

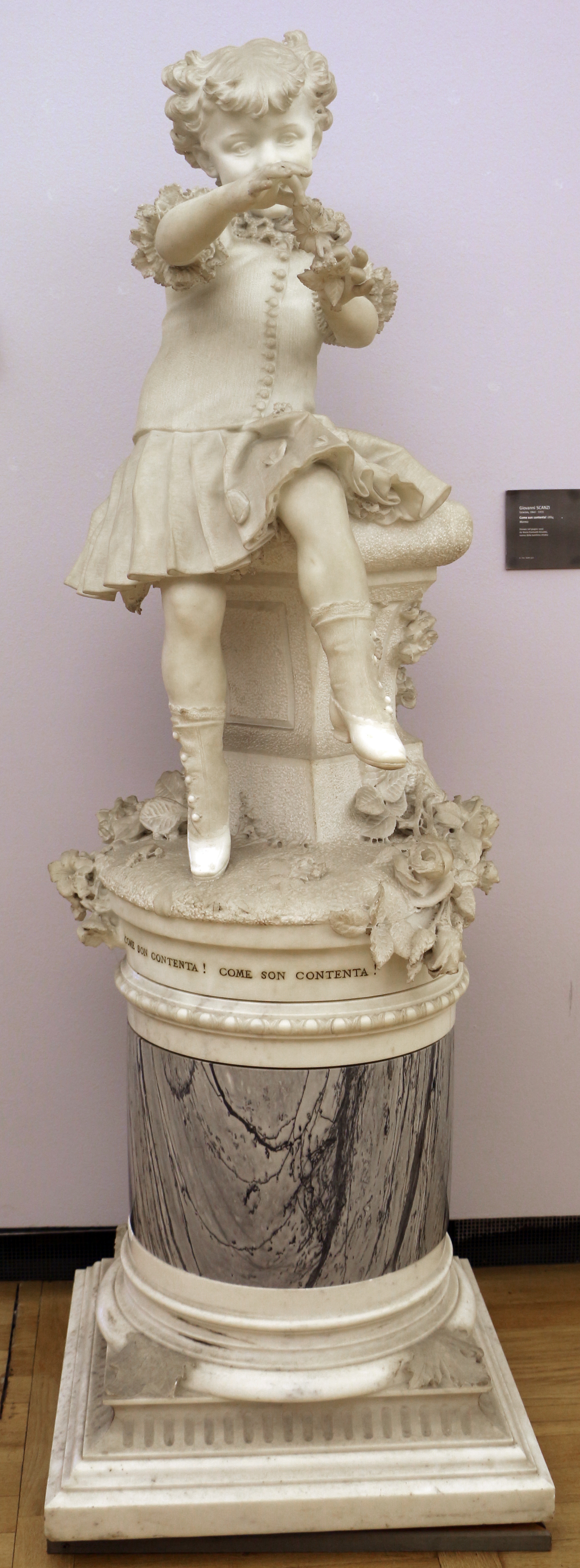
Come son contenta (1884), Musei di Nervi

== Bibliography ==
- Panzetta, Arturo. Nuovo dizionario degli scultori italiani dell'Ottocento e del primo Novecento: da Antonio Canova ad Arturo Martini, Volume 1. Torino: AdArte, 2003
- Partecipazio. Staglieno - Guida del Visitatore, Terza Edizione. Genova: Tipografia del R. Istituto Sordo-Muti, 1883 (eBook: books.google.com/ )
- La Vita italiana: rivista illustrata, Vol. 5, 1895, p.166
