= Female education =

Complex set of issues and debates surrounding education for girls and women

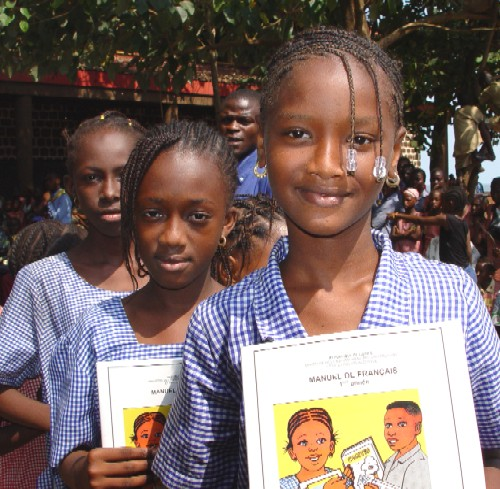
Schoolgirls in Guinea

Female education is a catch-all term for a complex set of issues and debates surrounding education (primary education, secondary education, tertiary education, and health education in particular) for girls and women. It is frequently called girls' education or women's education. It includes areas of gender equality and access to education. The education of women and girls is important for the alleviation of poverty. Broader related topics include single-sex education and religious education for women, in which education is divided along gender lines.

Inequalities in education for girls and women are complex: women and girls face explicit barriers to entry to school, for example, violence against women or prohibitions of girls from going to school, while other problems are more systemic and less explicit. For example, science, technology, engineering and mathematics (STEM) education disparities are deep rooted, even in Europe and North America. In some Western countries, women have surpassed men at many levels of education. For example, in the United States in 2020/2021, women earned 63% of associate degrees, 58% of bachelor's degrees, 62% of master's degrees, and 56% of doctorates. Additionally, women's education has been shown to improve communication skills and increase rates of civic participation.

Improving girls' educational levels has been demonstrated to have clear impacts on the health and economic future of young women, which in turn improves the prospects of their entire community. The infant mortality rate of babies whose mothers have received primary education is half that of children whose mothers are illiterate. In the poorest countries of the world, 50% of girls do not attend secondary school. Yet, research shows that every extra year of school for girls increases their lifetime income by 15%. Improving female education, and thus the earning potential of women, improves the standard of living for their own children, as women invest more of their income in their families than men do. Yet, many barriers to education for girls remain. In some African countries, such as Burkina Faso, girls are unlikely to attend school for such basic reasons as a lack of private latrine facilities for girls.

Education results in improved health and health awareness for women and their families. Furthering women's levels of education and advanced training also tends to delay the initiation of sexual activity, first marriage, and first childbirth. In developing countries, women's education has contributed to upturns in contraceptive use, lower incidence rates of sexually transmitted infections, and improve the amount of resources available to women who divorce or are in a situation of domestic violence. Advanced education for women increases their likelihood of remaining single, having no children, or having no formal marriage while maintaining long-term partnerships. A correlation between women's education, career opportunities, and altered life planning has also been suggested. Cultural traditions that place emphasis on traditional gender roles present obstacles to female education access in some communities.

Because of the wide-reaching effects of female education on society, strategies alleviating gender inequalities in education is highlighted in the United Nations' Sustainable Development Goal 4 "Quality Education for All" and deeply connected to Sustainable Development Goal 5 "Gender Equality". Education of girls (and empowerment of women in general) in developing countries leads to faster development and a faster decrease of population growth, thus playing a significant role in addressing environmental issues such as climate change mitigation. Project Drawdown estimates that educating girls is the sixth most efficient action against climate change (ahead of solar farms and nuclear power).

== Issues ==
=== Violence against women ===
Violence against women, specifically against girls and women that were students, became a political issue in Sweden during the period from 1900 to 1940. Educators were similarly affected. By 1900, 66 percent of Sweden's teachers were women, many of whom worked in isolated rural areas, where they faced loneliness and the threat of male violence. Politicians, teachers, and female authors debated a number of solutions to reduce these threats, such as providing the teachers with guard dogs, weapons, and telephones.

A study conducted in Pakistan revealed a negative relationship between formal levels of education and the occurrence of violence in a woman's lifetime (After, 2013). The study involved married women with different levels of educational attainment, ranging from complete illiteracy to master's level qualifications. Presence and severity of violent incidences were 10% lower in those who were literate compared to their illiterate counterparts, and with rates continuting to decline for each increase in qualification. Only 8% of women with a master's degree reported experiencing violence in their lifetimes.

The relationship is a lot more complicated than it seems, because women can be illiterate but still become empowered (Marrs Fuchsel, 2014). Immigrant Latina women were included in a qualitative study analyzing the use of an 11-week program centered on self-esteem, domestic violence awareness, and healthy relationships. Immigrant Latina women are highly affected by domestic violence. Though this program took place outside of a traditional classroom, dialogue, critical thinking and emotional well-being were stressed, areas that should be acquired while in school. Lastly, though many of the women were illiterate, they were still able to come away with a stronger sense of control over their own lives, an important life skill.

UNICEF noted 16 facts about violence against women and girls in Nigeria. Some of those facts include: physical effects, psychological effects, short-term and long-term effects; effects on the victims, the children and the society, among others. There are factors that promote violence against women on a country-wide scale, such as a lack of female education, which should be made openly known to the public. Development can be possible if individuals are able to learn positive habits that will shield them away from violence. In the 1980s, Zambia brought in schooling at all levels.

=== Women's empowerment ===
Education systems vary in administration, curriculum and personnel, but all influence the students that they serve. As women have gained rights, formal education has become a symbol of progress and a step toward gender equity. In order for true gender equity to exist, a holistic approach needs to be taken. Different places have different challenges requiring different solutions. However, focusing on women's empowerment in educational systems worldwide is shown to be successful. The discussion of girl power and women's education as solutions for eliminating violence against women and economic dependence on men can sometimes take dominance and result in the suppression of understanding how context, history and other factors affect women (Shenila Khoja-Moolji, 2015). For example, when past Secretary of State, Hillary Clinton, referenced the tragedies of Malala Yousafzai in Pakistan and the girls' kidnapping in Chibok, Nigeria, as comparable, using girls' education as the focus, history and context were ignored. What led to the shooting of Malala was reduced to being solely about her educating herself as a girl. United States interference, poverty, government corruption, and instability were not addressed.

Education systems and schools play a central role in determining girls' interest in various subjects, including STEM subjects, which can contribute to women's empowerment by providing equal opportunities to access and benefit from quality STEM education. To enhance female literacy in Bangladesh, the government has implemented a range of programs. These initiatives encompass distributing free books to all primary schoolchildren, providing free education for girls up to the university level, and granting stipends to girls attending rural secondary schools.

Gender equity goes further than simply enabling access to school; the curriculum also matters. There is a need to focus in schools on boosting girls' confidence and capacity to equally participate in society. The type of instruction teachers are using in the classroom determines empowerment among females and gender equality. Successful projects in Peru and Malawi have conducted teacher training using teaching guides for gender-sensitive instruction. The teacher guides have been created by Visionaria Network from Peru and Girls Empowerment Network from Malawi. They both received grants from WomenStrong International. These projects creates guides and teacher trainings for teachers to support gender sensitivity in classrooms and support girls in recognizing and reaching their full potential.

==== Impact on socio-economic development ====
The socioeconomic impact of female education constitutes a significant area of research within international development. Increases in the amount of female education in regions tends to correlate with high levels of development. Some of the effects are related to economic development. Women's education increases the income of women and leads to growth in GDP. Other effects are related to social development. Educating girls leads to a number of social benefits, including many related to women's empowerment.

Based on reachers, there is a correlation between education and changes in women's life planning and decision-making patterns (career paths and family formation). Studies indicate higher education levels influence higher participation in decision about marriage timing, family size, and career progression. Which delays traditional domestic roles in favor of these professional advancements. Educational access has been linked to women stepping into leadership roles, entrepreneurial positions, and technical occupations in communities that once considered these roles as rare for women. In societies with strong traditional gender roles implication, families may subconsciously limit investments into daughters' education, especially when a women's value is often measured by domestic work and child rearing. Members in these communities may resist female education; a seeming threat to social norms. This rejection can build onto a perpetuating cycle: education access restriction reinforces solidification in the expectations of a woman's role.

A systematic review on vocational and business training for women in low- and middle-income countries summarized the evidence from thirty-five studies regarding the impacts of such training programs. The authors found that these types of programs have small positive effects on employment and income with variability across studies. They found that the effects of training may increase with a stronger gender focus of the program.

=== Environmental impact ===
Education of girls (and empowerment of women in general) in developing countries leads to faster development and a faster decrease of population growth. It therefore has a significant impact on environmental issues such as climate change. The research network Drawdown estimates that educating girls is the sixth most efficient action against climate change (ahead of solar farms, nuclear power, afforestation and many other actions).

== Specific types of education ==
=== Technology education ===
The proliferation of digital technology and digital services has made digital skills a prerequisite for full participation in society. Today, an inability to navigate the internet poses disadvantages. While these disadvantages were once somewhat contained to wealthy countries, they are now relevant globally, due to the rapid and continuing proliferation of internet-connected technology.

Providing women and girls with digital skills expands numerous opportunities for increased agency and choice. Websites and mobile applications on health and legal rights, for example, can help women make informed decisions to safeguard and care for themselves and their families, while online social networks and digital communications allow women to disseminate information and share knowledge beyond their immediate community.

Mobile learning opportunities, from literacy apps to open online courses (MOOCs) about subjects as diverse as astronomy and caring for older relatives with dementia, can open up new educational pathways, especially for out-of-school girls and adult women. Job search engines and professional networking sites enable women to compete in the labour market, while e-commerce platforms and digital banking services can help increase their income and independence.

=== STEM education ===
Percentage of female students enrolled in engineering, manufacturing and construction programmes in higher education in different parts of the world

Female education in STEM refers to child and adult female representation in the educational fields of science, technology, engineering, and mathematics (STEM). In 2024, 35% of students in STEM fields were women.

The organization UNESCO has stated that this gender disparity is due to discrimination, biases, social norms and expectations that influence the quality of education women receive and the subjects they study. UNESCO believes that having more women in STEM fields is desirable because it would help bring about sustainable development but also believes that more women in STEM study and careers would help ensure that technological design is not inbuilt with negative gender stereotypes

=== Disability ===
Education for disabled women has also improved. In 2011, Giusi Spagnolo became the first woman with Down Syndrome to graduate college in Europe (she graduated from the University of Palermo in Italy).

== History ==
=== Africa ===
Christian missionaries in the 19th century opened modern educational methods, but they usually focused on boys. After early experiments they settled on promoting ideology of domestic femininity imparted through girls' schooling. In South Africa after 1820, male Scottish missionaries decided that only the most basic education was necessary to prepare native women for the propagation of Christianity within the home. They prevented female teachers from operating in the Scottish mission's territory. They delayed the establishment of a Girls' Department at Lovedale Institution. Finally new leadership arrived who had a broader vision of uplifting native women so they could promote Christianity and Western gender codes.

Muslims from India who came to East Africa in the late 19th century brought along a highly restrictive policy against schooling for their girls.

As of 2015, Priscilla Sitienei was attending elementary school in Kenya at age 92. She died in November 2022, at the age of 99, whilst preparing for final exams.

==== West Africa ====
===== Pre-colonial =====
Women's education in West Africa manifested in both formal and informal structures, with one of the more notable structures that had influence on women's education being preparatory schools labeled "Bush Schools". These bush schools were institutions that would oftentimes boast near 100% graduation rates and completed courses. They were organized by women and had a planned, structured curriculum, which included learning how to do skills such as learning how to "fish, cook, weave, spin cotton, dress hair, and make baskets, musical instruments, pots, and fishing nets." Much of the scholarship and research on these schools arises from the Bundu schools of Sierra Leone. In addition to these skills, girls would often be given reproductive education, such as birth control techniques or child-rearing skills. In particular, West Africa to the Bundu schools, women would be given an intense education in medicinal herbs and home medicinal skills. These schools did not just teach educational curriculum (such as history passed on through songs and dances), but enabled the transmission of cultural values and were centers of female power. Despite the colonial and post-colonial ideal that women should be educated just to serve decorative or child-bearing maternal roles, these institutions taught women to play central economic, corporate, and familial roles in their communities.

Traditional education in West Africa that predates colonial influence came about through the passing of skills, values, and knowledge from experienced elders to the youth. Some African societies would have initiation ceremonies, where the female children were taught history and mothercraft. They were "trained physiologically, socially, and morally to enable them to become competent mothers and wives." For the Poro society of West Africa, this form of schooling could last up to five years, while in the Tonga of Zambia it could range from six weeks to four months. In these forms of initiation, the children would be sent out to a specific location where they would be observed by professional teachers.

In the 19th century, Nana Asmaʼu (1793–1864) founded the Yan Taru movement for the education of Sokoto women.

===== Colonial =====
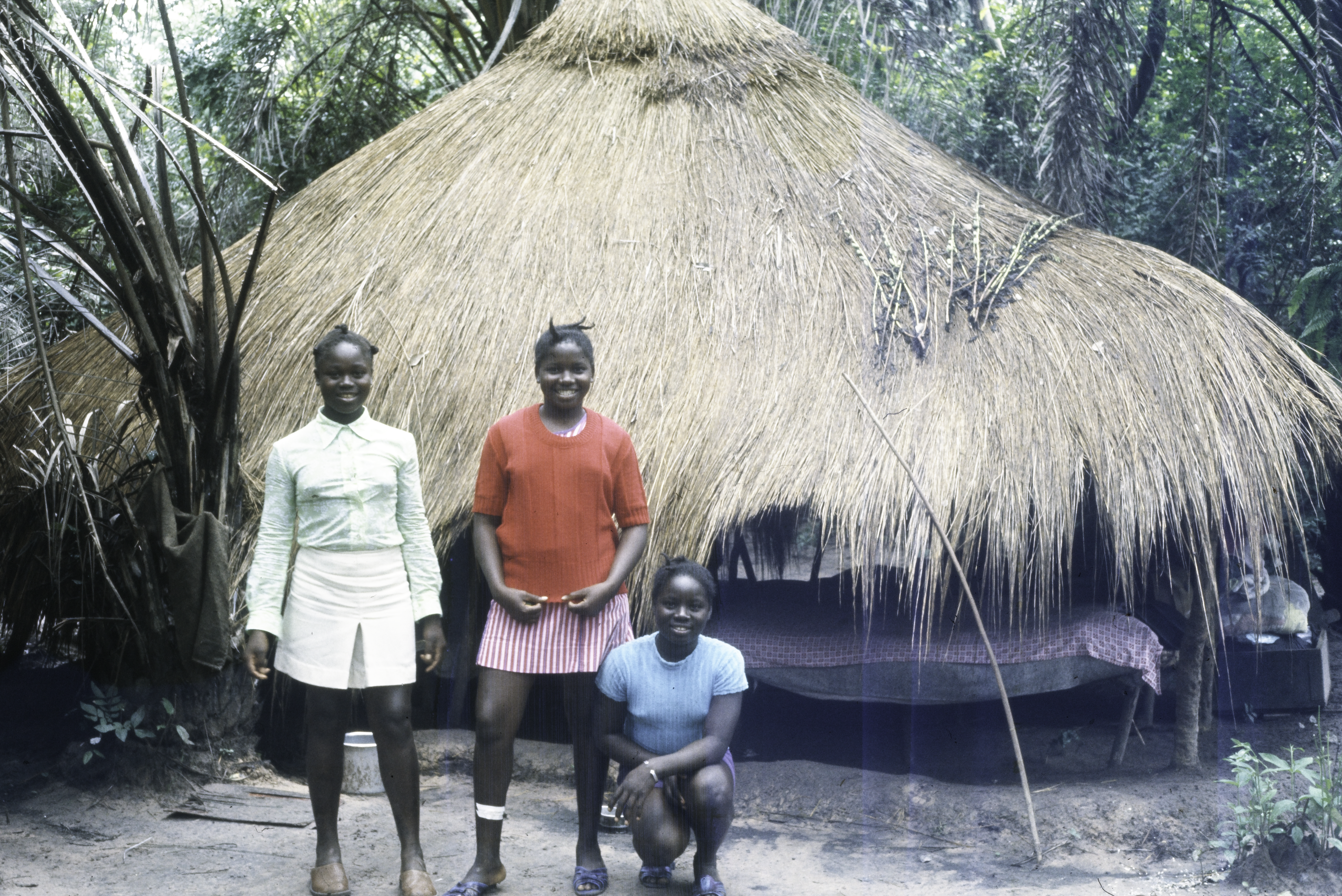
Three high-school girls in Hermangono, Guinea-Bissau, during the colonial war, 1974

Early colonial forms of education on the West African coasts, particularly among the Dahomey, Asante and Yorùbá people, were pioneered by missionaries and institutions that were trying to educate religious thought in addition to teaching more traditional western educational topics such as reading and writing. As early as 1529, King John III of Portugal had instructed to open schools and provide education in "religious thought, reading and writing" and for the instructors to be paid by the pupil. For women in particular, however, these colonial forms of education brought with them European ideals of women's roles in the family, society, and economy. These Western ideas of womanhood oftentimes contrasted with women's roles in the economy, society, or in the home. For example, Igbo women had associations known as Mikiri, which were economic and social forums for women in which they discussed direct action to enforce their interests, which were largely misunderstood and disregarded by various British colonial administrations. Hence, as the colonial administrations introduced schools to the region, they ignored educating women to fill economic roles in the community. The educational ideal of men as "breadwinners", i.e. the primary financial support of a nuclear family structure, was introduced by successive British colonial governments in West Africa.

One of the groups of people that the colonial governments in West Africa put heavy emphasis on educating were the mixed children of white people, typically men, and indigenous people, typically women. In the pre-British era of Ghanaian history, when much of the interaction between indigenous people and Europeans was through Dutch traders, mixed-race children of traders and indigenous people were removed from their indigenous communities and placed in Dutch educational institutions in Ghana. In these early colonial schools the education was also gendered by Western standards: the boys were educated from a young age to be military officers in the Dutch army and the girls were educated to be married to Dutch military officers in the region.

One of the other ways through which colonizing countries were able to exert influence and indirect rule over the indigenous people was through maternal education. In colonial Ghana, Methodist missionaries led classes teaching western methods of hygiene and child birth to the indigenous mothers or mothers-to-be. The missionaries tried to construct an ideal of motherhood that matched white European middle-class standards, irrespective of the social context of the ideals of motherhood in place in the Asante societies they were located in.

===== Contemporary =====
In post-colonial West Africa, many of the ideals of Western education have remained while much of the infrastructure and funding left with the colonial presence. Particularly in Nigeria, formal education was seen as a policy making tool, as women's formal education has been linked to having effects on "population growth, health, nutrition, fertility, infant mortality, and changes in women's productivity and earnings." Researchers have cited some disadvantages however to this reliance on women's formal education. There is concern for women being alienated from their indigenous cultures and not receiving the education in values that were typically received through pre-colonial indigenous educational systems. In addition, there is an increasing body of literature that suggests how the formal education institutions channel women into particular lower-earning job fields such as the humanities, while guiding women away from more technical jobs with higher wages.

In regard to academic achievement, according to the FAWE Conference, girls across the Sub-Saharan region reported lower scores in Math and Science subjects. The tendency for girls to be pushed into clerical positions upon finishing school is also a widely researched and held belief. Despite this, formal education offers many benefits recognized internationally. The Fourth World Conference on Women of the United Nations has released publications citing numerous ways through which women's education in Africa is beneficial to society as a whole. These entail an increase in family health, in higher wage jobs available to women, an improvement in quality standards of childhood development, and a greater inclusion of women in decision-making that can impact a nation in environmental, political, social, and economic ways. Despite there being a drop in participation of women in education in the majority of countries in West Africa in the 1950s and 1960s, rates of women's education have been steadily climbing since then. However, there is still much statistical gender disparity according to UNESCO statistics on women's enrollment and graduation rates.

The United Nations dedicated 2023 World Education Day to Afghan girls and women, who have been restricted from getting an education by the Taliban government.

===== Gender disparities =====
One of the primary ways in which there are gender disparities in education in West Africa are in the ratios of male to female participation: 43.6% of men have completed primary education as opposed to 35.4% of women, 6.0% of men have completed secondary education as opposed to 3.3% of women, and 0.7% of men have completed tertiary education as opposed to 0.2% of women. Some of the reasons for poor enrollment and participation is the "male breadwinner" ideal that prioritizes educating boys over girls and limited funds available to families for education. In addition, in West Africa women are seen as the primary providers of unpaid care work. This offers competing demands on the time of girls and oftentimes their families will prioritize girls' spending time taking care of siblings or doing domestic labor. In addition, a leading cause of gender disparities in education are gender disparities in the labor market, which lead to gendered ideas of women's role in a society.

In addition to this, some gender disparities are caused by teachers' attitudes towards students in the classroom according to the students' gender. There are some preconceived notions that boys are more intelligent and harder working than girls in some West African countries. In particular in Guinea, surveys have been taken by researchers suggesting that school teachers, particularly in rural schools, believe that boys learn lessons better, have more ambition, are smarter, and work harder, while girls make less effort, rarely give good responses to questions, and use poor French expression. In addition, in both urban and rural schools analyzed, girls were expected to do the manual labor to keep the schools clean, while this expectation was not held for the boys.

Gender disparities in higher education persist as well, with women accounting for a little over 20% of university-level enrollment in all of Sub-Saharan Africa, and countries in West Africa such as Niger and Ghana reporting rates of 15% and 21%, respectively. This is considered a contributing factor to why there are so few women in higher-level management and administrative jobs. In Ghana in 1990, women made up less than 1% of managers in the labor market, but with an average annual growth rate of 3.2%. Researchers hope that improving primary education attainment and accomplishment will lead to more attainment and accomplishment in the tertiary educational level and in the labor market.

==== Gender equality in African education ====
In the past few decades, African countries have attached great importance to the role of education in the process of nation-state construction and development. Therefore, education has been placed on the policy priorities, and the rapid expansion of the number of educational institutions at all levels has greatly increased women's educational opportunities. In particular, after the World Conference on Education for All, women's education received special attention in Africa and achieved rapid development.

===== Progress =====
Taking Sub-Saharan Africa as an example: in early 1960, the gross enrollment rate of girls in primary education, secondary education, and higher education was 25%, 1%, and 0.1%, respectively. By 2006, the figures were 89%, 28%, and 4%, respectively.

While the enrollment rate of women at all levels is increasing, the gender parity index is also improving. In sub-Saharan Africa, the gender parity index for primary school enrollment in 1980, 1990, 2000, and 2006 was 0.77, 0.81, 0.89, and 0.92, respectively. In some countries, women's gross enrollment ratios even exceed men's gross enrollment rates, such as the Gambia, Ghana, Malawi, and Zambia. The gender parity index for secondary and higher education also tends to increase.

In addition to the enrollment rate and gender parity index, other indicators, such as repetition rates, dropout rates, graduation rates, etc., also reflect the progress of women's education in Africa. In 1999, the repetition rate of female primary education in Sub-Saharan African countries was 17.7%, and in 2006 it fell to 13.3%. At the same time, the increase in female enrollment rates has also led to a growing number of female teachers in Africa.

===== Challenge =====
In recent decades, female education in Africa has made great (though uneven) progress. On the one hand, the level of development of women's education between countries and countries in this region is still significantly different due to differences in geographical location, social class, language and ethnicity. On the other hand, compared with the rest of the world, Africa, especially in Sub-Saharan Africa, still lags in the field of women's education. Educational interventions in conflict-affected regions must adopt a more holistic and culturally sensitive approach to reshape gender norms and foster sustainable peace-building efforts.

Compared with men, women in most African countries have been disadvantaged in education, and the higher the level of education, the more unfavorable the situation. One of the most important reasons for this "vertical separation" is that girls' academic performance is worse than that of boys, and the percentage of students who can graduate and pass the exam is low. At the same time, in the diversion of secondary education and higher education, there is also a "level separation" of gender, which means that boys and girls are concentrated in certain classes and majors, so that these courses become male-dominated subjects or female-dominated subjects. For example, in the fields of education, humanities, and art, the proportion of girls generally far exceeds that of boys. Science, engineering, and architecture are dominated by boys.

==== Obstacles ====
There are gender differences in education in Africa, and the factors that lead to these differences are manifold. The factors that hinder the education of gender equality can be roughly divided into economic factors, school-related factors, and social and cultural factors.

===== Economic =====
Family economic status is an important factor in determining whether a parent is capable of withstanding the direct and indirect costs of a child's education. Direct costs include tuition, school uniform fees, transportation fees and other material fees like textbooks. In Kenya, 47% of the rural population and 27% of the urban population live below the poverty line, yet they have to bear nearly 60% of the cost of primary education. This forces them to selectively educate their children. For poor families, girls are the most direct victims when education costs are unaffordable. In a survey in the mid-1990s, 58% of respondents let their daughters drop out, while only 27% of respondents chose sons.

Compared with boys, the opportunity cost of girls to go to school is higher, because they bear multiple roles such as family workers and mothers' assistants, and they have to bear more labor than men. For example, in a province of Zambia, girls spend four times as much time on direct productive labor as boys. Therefore, girls' late schooling, absenteeism, and dropouts are closely related to labor.

===== School-related =====
The location of the school has a direct impact on the type of education that women receive, the quality of education, and the time of education. Many parents are unwilling to let young children go to school far away from home, and the distance between the school and the home is very common in rural Africa. Insufficient infrastructure, such as school teaching, health, and dormitory, can also prevent women from entering school. At the same time, the curriculum and related teachers, syllabus, textbooks, and teaching methods lack gender awareness or exhibit gender bias, which has far more adverse effects for girls than boys. In many African countries, it is still necessary to strengthen the society's perception of women's family life, and to hide the prejudice that women's intelligence is not as good as men's. In such a learning environment, women's learning attitudes are often negative, and they cannot fully exert their abilities. In the secondary and higher education stages, women are usually assigned to learn courses that are more feminine, such as home economics, craft classes, or biology (biological is considered to be related to women's traditional occupations, such as nursing).

In addition, various forms of sexual violence and sexual harassment in schools, or concerns about sexual violence and sexual harassment, are silent barriers to girls' enrollment. These behaviors not only affect the school's academic performance, but also cause pregnancy, early marriage and so on. At the same time, in many countries, teenage pregnancy almost interrupted girls' school education.

===== Social =====
Africa's deep-rooted attitude towards women may be traced back to the patriarchal system that continued in African native culture and colonial experience. Traditionally, women's reproductive and family roles are of great value. Adolescent African girls feel this pressure strongly because they either assist their mother or other female relatives to complete their home tasks or achieve a transition to an adult role, such as a wife or mother, at this time. From that age, some girls who are still in elementary school are at risk of interrupting their studies. The traditional concept of marriage in Africa regards investment in women's education as a waste; that is, all proceeds flow to another family. Therefore, it is often difficult for women to get care from their fathers and thus lose many educational opportunities.

Many tribes in different parts of the world do not advocate for women education. Their cultural values are violated in case of disobedience to their ancestors.

==== Policy interventions ====
===== Cost-related =====
Effectively promote universal, free, and compulsory basic education, reduce or eliminate the direct cost of basic education, so that primary education can be more affordable. For example, in 2001, Tanzania implemented free primary education, resulting in a rapid increase in the gross enrollment rate of women's primary education from 61.6% to 88.8%.

===== Schools =====
Schools aim to create a safe and fair learning environment and an institutional culture that is conducive to women. Gender considerations are taken into account in the supply and allocation of resources to meet women's specific educational needs and strengthen gender awareness education for all teachers and educators.

===== Governments =====
The government plays an important role in advancing gender equality in education. One of its roles is to create a good environment through laws and policies to promote women's education to achieve gender equality. Beyond the law, the government must also set up a clear framework. For example, in Ethiopia, the government clearly stipulates that women and men have the same opportunity to accept the same curriculum, and are free to choose a profession to ensure that women have the same employment opportunities as men.

=== Asia ===
==== By country ====
===== Afghanistan =====
Modern social reform for Afghan women began when Queen Soraya, wife of King Amanullah, made rapid reforms to improve women's lives and their position in the family, marriage, education, and professional life. She founded the first women's magazine (Irshad-e Naswan, 1922), the first women's organization (Anjuman-i Himayat-i-Niswan), the first school for girls (Masturat School in 1920), the first theatre for women in Paghman and the first hospital for women (the Masturat Hospital in 1924). In 1928, Amanullah sent fifteen female graduates of the Masturat middle school, daughters of the royal family and government officials, to study in Turkey. Soraya Tarzi was the only woman to appear on the list of rulers in Afghanistan, and was credited with having been one of the first and most powerful Afghan and Muslim female activists. However, Queen Soraya, along with her husband's, advocacy of social reforms for women led to a protest and contributed to the ultimate demise of her and her husband's reign in 1929. King Amanullah Khan's deposition caused a severe backlash, the girls 'schools were closed, the female students who had been allowed to study in Turkey was recalled to Afghanistan and forced to put on the veil and enter purdah again, and polygamy for men was reintroduced.

Successors Mohammed Nadir Shah and Mohammed Zahir Shah acted more cautiously, but nevertheless worked for the moderate and steady improvement of women's rights. Women were allowed to take classes at the Masturat Women's Hospital in Kabul in 1931, and some girls' schools were reopened; the first High School for girls was officially called a 'Nursing School' to prevent any opposition to it.

After the Second World War, modernization reforms were seen as necessary by the government, which resulted in the resurrection of a state women's movement. In 1946 the government-supported Women's Welfare Association (WWA) was founded with Queen Humaira Begum as patron, giving school classes for girls and vocational classes to women, and from 1950 women students were accepted at the Kabul University. The Taliban banned women from education in 1996. When the Taliban was removed from power in 2001, women were again allowed to study.

After taking control of the country in 2021, the Taliban gradually banned education for girls and women above the 6th grade. Women were also prohibited from working as teachers and in other professions, creating problems for girls' elementary education and leading to a risky underground network of girls' schools.

===== China =====
====== Pre-1949 ======
Along with the custom of footbinding among Chinese women that lasted through the end of the 19th century, it was recognized that a woman's virtue lay with her lack of knowledge. As a result, female education was not considered to be worthy of attention. With the arrival of numerous Christian missionaries from Britain and the U.S. to China in the 19th century and some of them being involved in the starting of schools for women, female education started to receive some attention.

Due to the social custom that men and women should not be near one another, the women of China were reluctant to be treated by male doctors of Western medicine. This resulted in a tremendous need for women in Western medicine in China. Thus, female medical missionary, Dr. Mary H. Fulton (1854–1927), was sent by the Foreign Missions Board of the Presbyterian Church (U.S.A.) to found the first medical college for women in China. Known as the Hackett Medical College for Women (夏葛女子醫學院), this college was located in Guangzhou, China, and was enabled by a large donation from Edward A.K. Hackett (1851–1916) of Indiana, United States. The college was dedicated in 1902 and offered a four-year curriculum. By 1915, there were more than 60 students, mostly in residence. Most students became Christians due to the influence of Dr. Fulton. The college was officially recognized, with its diplomas marked with the official stamp of the Guangdong provincial government. The college was aimed at the spreading of Christianity and modern medicine and the elevation of Chinese women's social status. The David Gregg Hospital for Women and Children (also known as Yuji Hospital 柔濟醫院 was affiliated with this college. The graduates of this college included Lee Sun Chau (周理信, 1890–1979, alumna of (Belilios Public School) and WONG Yuen-hing (黃婉卿), both of whom graduated in the late 1910s and then practiced medicine in the hospitals in Guangdong province.

====== People's Republic (1949–present) ======
Between the years 1931 and 1945, the percent of uneducated women was over 90%, and most of the women who were educated had only completed the elementary level. In the 1950s, after the establishment of the People's Republic of China, the government started a civilization project. It enabled large amounts of uneducated women to learn basic writing and calculation. This project raised the proportion of educated women. It was promoted not only in cities but also in rural area. Villages had their own elementary schools. Instead of only taking care of children and chores at home, middle-aged women had chances to learn writing and reading in local schools.

In the 1980s, Chinese central government passed a new education law, which required local governments to promote 9-year obligation education nationwide. The new education law guaranteed education rights until middle school. Before the 1960s, female enrollment in elementary school was 20%. 20 years after publishing this education law, in the year 1995, this percentage had increased to 98.2%. By 2003, the proportion of females who dropped out of middle school decreased to 2.5%.

According to the fifth national census in 2000, the average education length of females is up to 7.4 years. This digit increases from 7.0 years to 7.4 years in 3 years. However, the female education duration is still 0.8 years less than male's duration. This gap in higher levels of education is larger in rural areas. In the countryside, parents tend to use their limited resources for sons because they believe sons have greater abilities to bring more back and their contributions to the family in the future are more significant than daughters. In an investigation, parents are 21.9% more likely to stop financing girls' education if they come into financial problems and family issues. Boys are provided with more opportunities for further studying, especially after middle school. This difference became more evident in the universities.

In the 21st century, university education is becoming more prevalent. The total enrollment goes up. Compared to the year of 1977, which is the first year when the college entrance examination was recovered, the admission rate increased from 4.8% to 74.9%. Since the general admission has largely risen, more students have been getting into universities. Although women are assumed to own the same rights of general education, they are forced to do better in the Chinese college entrance examination (Gaokao) than males. Girls need to achieve higher grades than male students in order to get into the same level university. It is an invisible ceiling for Chinese females, especially in the top universities. It is not a public rule but a mainstream consensus among most Chinese university admission offices. According to a telephone interview with an officer, who declined to give her name, at the Teaching Office at the China University of Political Science and Law, "female students must account for less than 15 percent of students because of the nature of their future career."

===== India =====
====== Vedic period ======
Most females were allowed to pursue education without significant constraints in the Vedic period. Women's education, unlike in the subsequent periods was not neglected. Female scholars were also present during this period. The educators of this period had divided women into two groups – Brahmavadinis and Sadyodvahas. The former were life-long students of philosophy and theology. Sadyodvahas used to continue their studies until they got married. There were many women poets and philosophers, such as Apala, Ghosha, Visvavara, Sulabha Maitreyi and Gargi.

====== British India ======
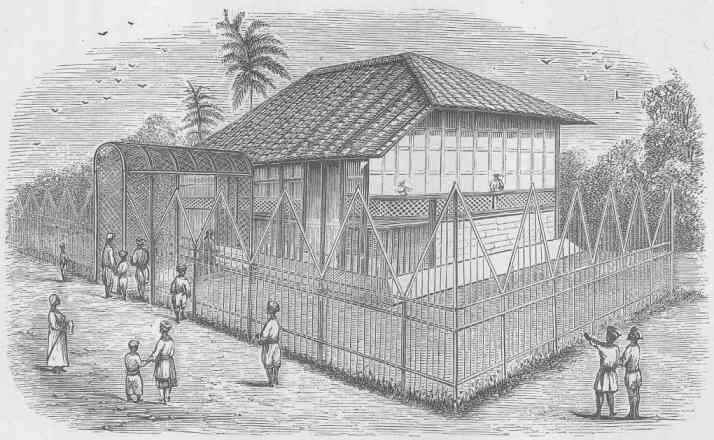
London Mission Bengali Girls' School, Calcutta (LMS, 1869, p.12)

The Church Missionary Society tasted greater success in South India. The first boarding school for girls came up in Tirunelveli in 1821. By 1840, the Scottish Church Society constructed six schools with a roll strength of 200 Hindu girls. When it was mid-century, the missionaries in Madras had included under its banner 8,000 girls. Women's employment and education were acknowledged in 1854 by the East Indian Company's Programme: Wood's Despatch. Slowly, after that, there was progress in female education, but it initially tended to be focused on the primary school level and was related to the richer sections of society. The overall literacy rate for women increased from 0.2% in 1882 to 6% in 1947.

In western India, Jyotiba Phule and his wife Savitribai Phule became pioneers of female education when they started a school for girls in 1848 in Pune. In eastern India, notable contributions came from Indian social reformers such as Raja Ram Mohan Roy, Ishwar Chandra Vidyasagar alongside John Elliot Drinkwater Bethune, who was also a pioneer in promoting women's education in 19th-century India. With participation of like-minded social reformers like Ramgopal Ghosh, Raja Dakshinaranjan Mukherjee and Pandit Madan Mohan Tarkalankar, Bethune established Calcutta's (now Kolkata) first school for girls in 1849 called the secular Native Female School, which later came to be known as Bethune School. In 1879, Bethune College, affiliated to the University of Calcutta, was established, which is the oldest women's college in Asia.

In 1878, the University of Calcutta became one of the first Indian universities to admit female graduates to its degree programmes, before any British universities would begin to do the same. This point was later raised during the controversy surrounding the 1883 Ilbert Bill, a proposed legislation which would allow Indian judges to judge European offenders. The Anglo-Indian community in India largely opposed the bill, claiming that Indians (both male and female) were largely uneducated and thus unsuited to judging European offenders in court. Indian women who supported the bill responded by noting that they were more educated as a whole then the Anglo-Indian women who opposed the bill, pointing out that more women in India had gained academic degrees than those living in the United Kingdom.

====== Independent India ======
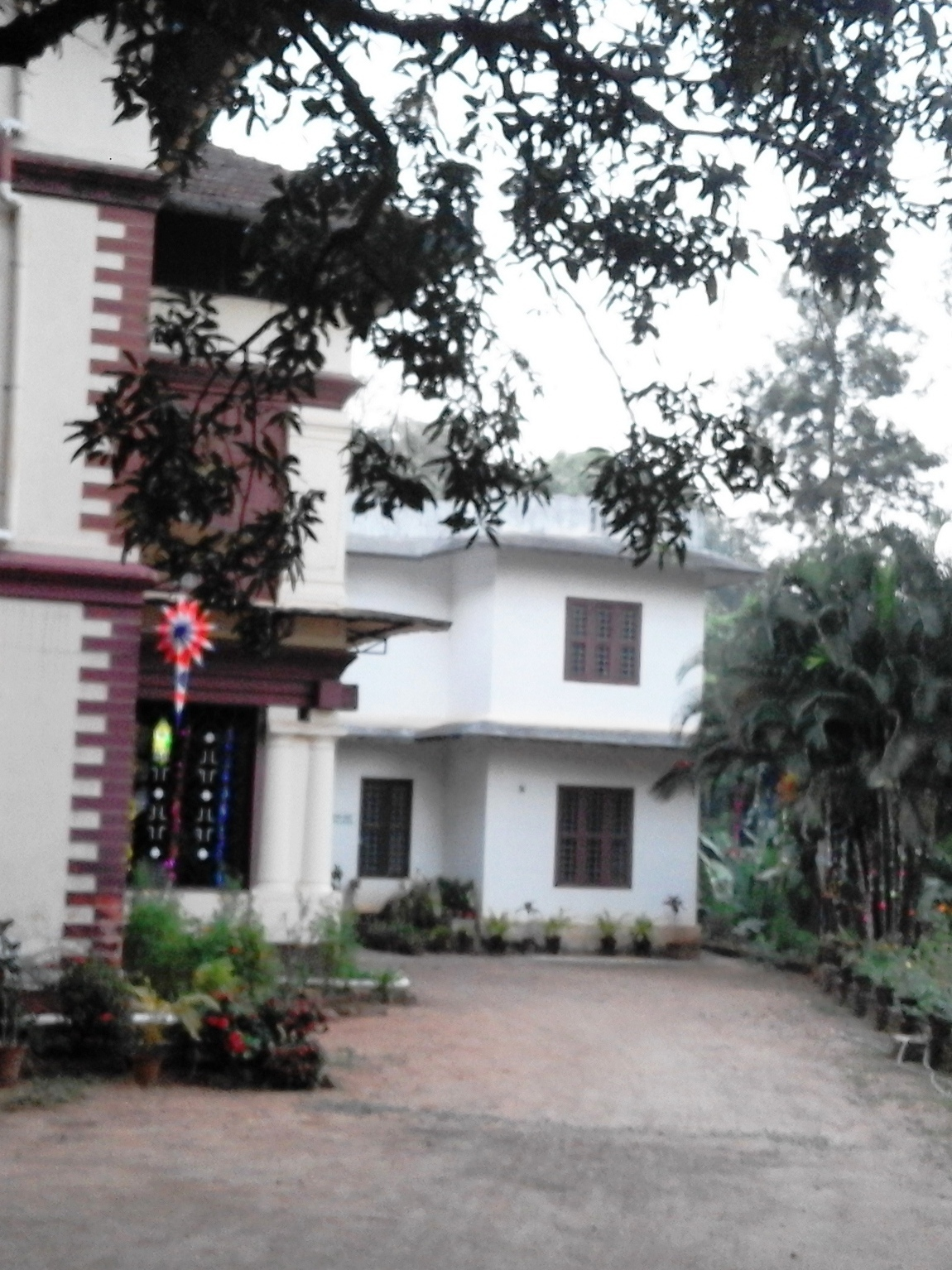
A girls' college in Palakkad, India

After India attained independence in 1947, the University Education Commission was created to recommend suggestions to improve the quality of education. However, their report spoke against female education, referring to it as: "Women's present education is entirely irrelevant to the life they have to lead. It is not only a waste but often a definite disability."

However, the fact that the female literacy rate was at 8.9% post-Independence could not be ignored. Thus, in 1958, a national committee on women's education was appointed by the government, and most of its recommendations were accepted. The crux of its recommendations were to bring female education on the same footing as offered for boys.

Soon afterwards, committees were created that talked about equality between men and women in the field of education. For example, one committee on differentiation of curriculum for boys and girls (1959) recommended equality and a common curricula at various stages of their learning. Further efforts were made to expand the education system, and the Education Commission was set up in 1964, which largely talked about female education, which recommended a national policy to be developed by the government. This occurred in 1968, providing increased emphasis on female education.

====== Current policies ======
Before and after Independence, India has been taking active steps towards women's status and education. The 86th Constitutional Amendment Act, 2001, has been a path breaking step towards the growth of education, especially for females. According to this act, elementary education is a fundamental right for children between the ages of 6 and 14. The government has undertaken to provide this education free of cost and make it compulsory for those in that age group. This undertaking is more widely known as Sarva Shiksha Abhiyan (SSA).

Since then, the SSA has come up with many schemes for inclusive as well as exclusive growth of Indian education as a whole, including schemes to help foster the growth of female education.

The major schemes are the following:

- Mahila Samakhya Program: This program was launched in 1988 as a result of the New Education Policy (1968). It was created for the empowerment of women from rural areas especially socially and economically marginalized groups. When the SSA was formed, it initially set up a committee to look into this programme, how it was working and recommend new changes that could be made.
- Kasturba Gandhi Balika Vidyalaya Scheme (KGBV): This scheme was launched in July, 2004, to provide education to girls at primary level. It is primarily for the underprivileged and rural areas where literacy level for females is very low. The schools that were set up have 100% reservation: 75% for backward class and 25% for BPL (below Poverty line) females.
- National Programme for Education of Girls at Elementary Level (NPEGEL): This programme was launched in July 2003. It was an incentive to reach out to the girls who the SSA was not able to reach through other schemes. The SSA called out to the "hardest to reach girls". This scheme has covered 24 states in India. Under the NPEGEL, "model schools" have been set up to provide better opportunities to girls.

One notable success came in 2013, when the first two girls ever scored in the top 10 ranks of the entrance exam to the Indian Institutes of Technology (IITs). Sibbala Leena Madhuri ranked eighth, and Aditi Laddha ranked sixth.

In addition, the status and literacy rates between West Bengal and Mizoram were found to be profound; a study compared the two states as they took on politically different approaches to helping empower women (Ghosh, Chakravarti, & Mansi, 2015). In West Bengal, literacy rates were found to be low even after fulfilling the 73rd amendment from 1992. The amendment established affirmative action by allotting 33% of seats at panchayats, or local self-governments, to women. Mizoram chose not to partake in the 73rd Amendment but has seen greater literacy rates, it is second highest in the country, and also has a better sex ratio. It was thus found that affirmative actions steps alone were not enough. Women also need to be given the opportunity to develop through formal education to be empowered to serve and profit from holding these public leadership roles.

====== Raising awareness ======
The Canadian start-up Decode Global has developed the mobile game Get Water!, a game for social change focusing on the water scarcity in India and the effect it has on girls' education, especially in slums and rural areas. In areas with no ready access to water, girls are often pulled out of school to collect water for their families. Another step in this direction has been Shakti program started by Anandmurti Gurumaa where girls are trained in entrepreneurial skills for financial independence.

===== Iran =====
====== Islamic Republic of Iran ======
Since the 1979 revolution, Iran was under control of Islamic rules, the progress of female education was affected by Islamic ecclesiocracy. Women are forced to wear veiling and are prevented from going to the same school as male students. Female students have to learn different versions of textbooks, which are special editions only for female students. Unmarried women are ineligible for financial aid if they attempt to study abroad. Throughout the past 30 years, the issue of female education has been constantly under debate.

Iranian women do have desires and abilities to pursue further education. An Iranian high school student can earn a diploma after studying for three years. If students aim to enter colleges, they will stay in the high schools for the fourth year study, which has very intense study. According to researches, 42% of female students choose to have fourth year in the high school but only 28% of male students choose to study in order to enter university. Moreover, women have a much higher probability than men to pass college entrance exams. Islamic female are in need of achieving higher education and truth proved that their abilities are enough for getting higher education. The education opportunities for female need more national attention and less regulations.

During 1978 and 1979, the proportion of women who participated in universities as students or faculties was rather low. 31% of students admitted to universities were women. For faculty gender composition, there are 14% female. This situation has changed with time passing by. University enrollment was decreased under the influence of Iranian Cultural Revolution. The general enrollment population declined during that time. After the cultural revolution, the amount of enrollment was going up. The increase in the number of university students is accompanied with an increase in female rate.

Islamic higher education contains five levels: associate, bachelor's, master's, professional doctorate and specialized doctorate. Before the revolution, the gender gap is obvious in master level and specialized doctorate, which are only 20% and 27%. It has changed after 30 years. In 2007, the female percent in master's degree rose up to 43% and for specialized doctorate degree, this data rose up to 33%.

Female rate has not only increased in the students but also in faculty. Twenty years ago, only 6% of all professors and 8% of all associated professors were women. Now 8% of all professors and 17% of all associated professors are female.

====== Literacy programs ======
While formal education is prevalent amongst Iranian women, non-formal educational intuitions are an option as well. Non-formal education in the Islamic Republic of Iran originated from the Literary Movement Organization (LMO), which aspired to decrease illiteracy rates in the country. Established in 1984, LMO's tremendous efforts rectified the Pahlavi regime's neglect in regards to educating children and populations in rural areas. In the late 1980s, LMO created adult literacy programs, vocational-technical schools, and religious institutions to combat high illiteracy rates. Adult literacy programs teach introductory reading, writing, and math in two cycles. While reading, writing, dictation, and arithmetic are introduced in the first cycle, the second cycle delves into Islamic studies, experimental and social sciences, and the Persian language. Although these educational organizations are gender inclusive, they mainly cater to women; in fact, 71% of enrollees are women between the ages of 15 and 45. Throughout the 1990s, two-thirds of enrollees in literacy programs were women, which directly led to a dramatic rise (20%) in female literacy rates in Iran from 1987 to 1997.

====== Religious schools ======
Religious schools are another educational route for Iranian women. Their popularity is illustrated by the rise in the institution of "female seminaries" as of 2010. In 1984, Ayatollah Khomeini, former supreme leader of Iran, called for the creation of Jami'at al-Zahra, an alliance of smaller religious schools. This led to the creation of the first female seminary in Iran. These institutions offer the opportunity to earn anything from high school diplomas to doctoral degrees. The acceptance rate for women into these religious institutions was 28% in 2010 (7,000 accepted out of 25,000 applicants).

====== Other educational routes ======
Newlyweds (women specifically) are educated on family planning, safe sex, and birth control in population control programs. In addition, the government has established rural health houses managed by local health workers. These health professionals travel to different areas in order to impart information about women's health and birth control.

===== Saudi Arabia =====
Women in Saudi Arabia play an important role, and Women have a higher graduation rate from college than males do in 2023. Women receive free, widespread access to K-12, undergraduate, and graduate Education, including full-board scholarships to over 512 universities globally.

In 1955, Queen (Princess at the time) Effat, King Faisal's Wife, of Saudi Arabia established "Dar Al Hanan", the first school for girls in the country. In 1959, King Saud addressed the nation, started a public Girl Education program. In 1960, "Kuliyat Al Banat" (The girl college) was launched, which was the first girl form of higher education in Saudi Arabia. By 1961 there were 12 elementary schools for girls and by 1965 there were 160. By 1970, there 357 and by 1975 there were 963, and 1980 there were 1,810. By 1981, the number of girls enrolled in public schools almost equaled the number of boys.

In 2005, the Saudi government launched King Abdullah Scholarship Program (KASP), with over half of the scholarship beneficiaries being women. In 2015, 44,000 women had graduated from top universities in the US, East Asia, Europe, and more. The scholarship provided full-board scholarships for women including a year-round ticket, monthly stipend, full tuition coverage, free private tutoring, and even a monthly stipend and yearly ticket for a male family relative to travel with all the women students.

==== Islamic countries ====
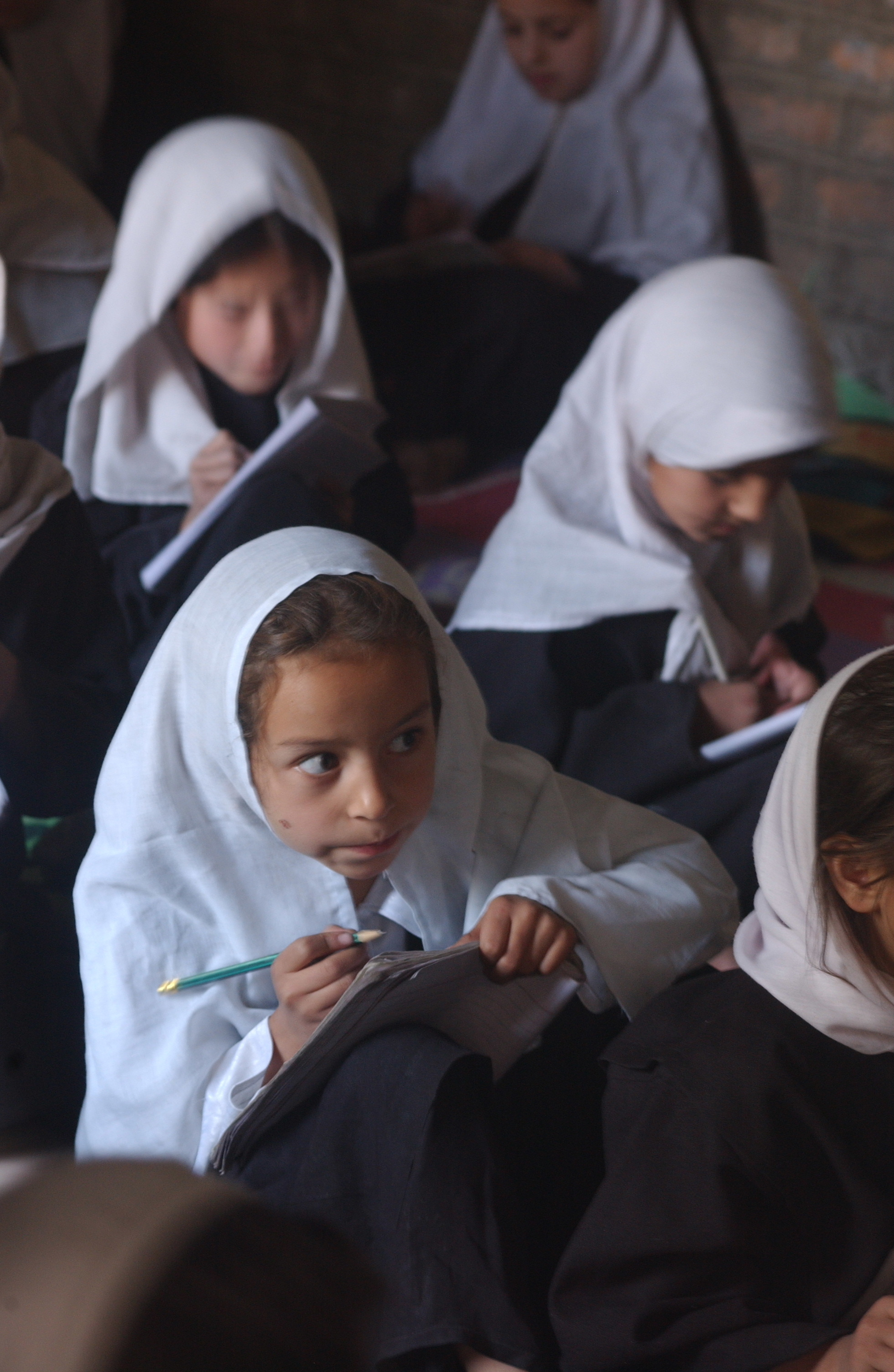
Girls' class in Afghanistan, 2002

Women in Islam played an important role in the foundations of many educational institutions, such as Fatima al-Fihri's founding of the mosque of Al Karaouine, from which in later centuries developed what some consider the oldest existing, continually operating educational institution in the world according to UNESCO and Guinness World Records, in 859. This continued through to the Ayyubid dynasty in the 12th and 13th centuries, when 160 mosques (places of worship) and madrasas (places of education) were established in Damascus, 26 of which were funded by women through the Waqf (charitable trust or trust law) system. Half of all the royal patrons for these institutions were also women.

According to the Sunni scholar Ibn Asakir, in the 12th century, there were opportunities for female education in the mediaeval Islamic world. Asakir wrote that women should study, earn ijazahs (academic degrees), and qualify as scholars and teachers. This was especially the case for learned and scholarly families, who wanted to ensure the highest possible education for both their sons and daughters. Ibn Asakir himself had studied under 80 different female teachers in his time. According to a hadith collected in the Saḥih of al-Bukhārī, the women of Medina who aided Muhammad were notable for not letting social mores restrain their education in religious knowledge. Further, In the 15th century, al-Sakhawi dedicated an entire volume of his biographical dictionary to female scholars, documenting information on 1,075 of them.

"How splendid were the women of the anṣār; shame did not prevent them from becoming learned [yatafaqqahna] in the faith."

While it was unusual for females to enroll as students in formal classes, it was common for women to attend informal lectures and study sessions at mosques, madrasas, and other public places. While there were no legal restrictions on female education, some men, such as Muhammad ibn al-Hajj (d. 1336), did not approve of this practice and were appalled at the behavior of some women who informally audited lectures in his time.

While women accounted for no more than one percent of Islamic scholars prior to the 12th century, there was a large increase of female scholars after this. In the 15th century, al-Sakhawi devoted an entire volume of his 12-volume biographical dictionary al-Ḍawʾ al-lāmiʻ to female scholars, giving information on 1,075 of them. More recently, the scholar Mohammad Akram Nadwi, currently a researcher from the Oxford Centre for Islamic Studies, has written 40 volumes on the muḥaddithāt (the women scholars of ḥadīth), ( a short introduction published named Al-Muhaddithat) and found at least 8,000 of them.

=== Europe ===
==== Ancient period ====
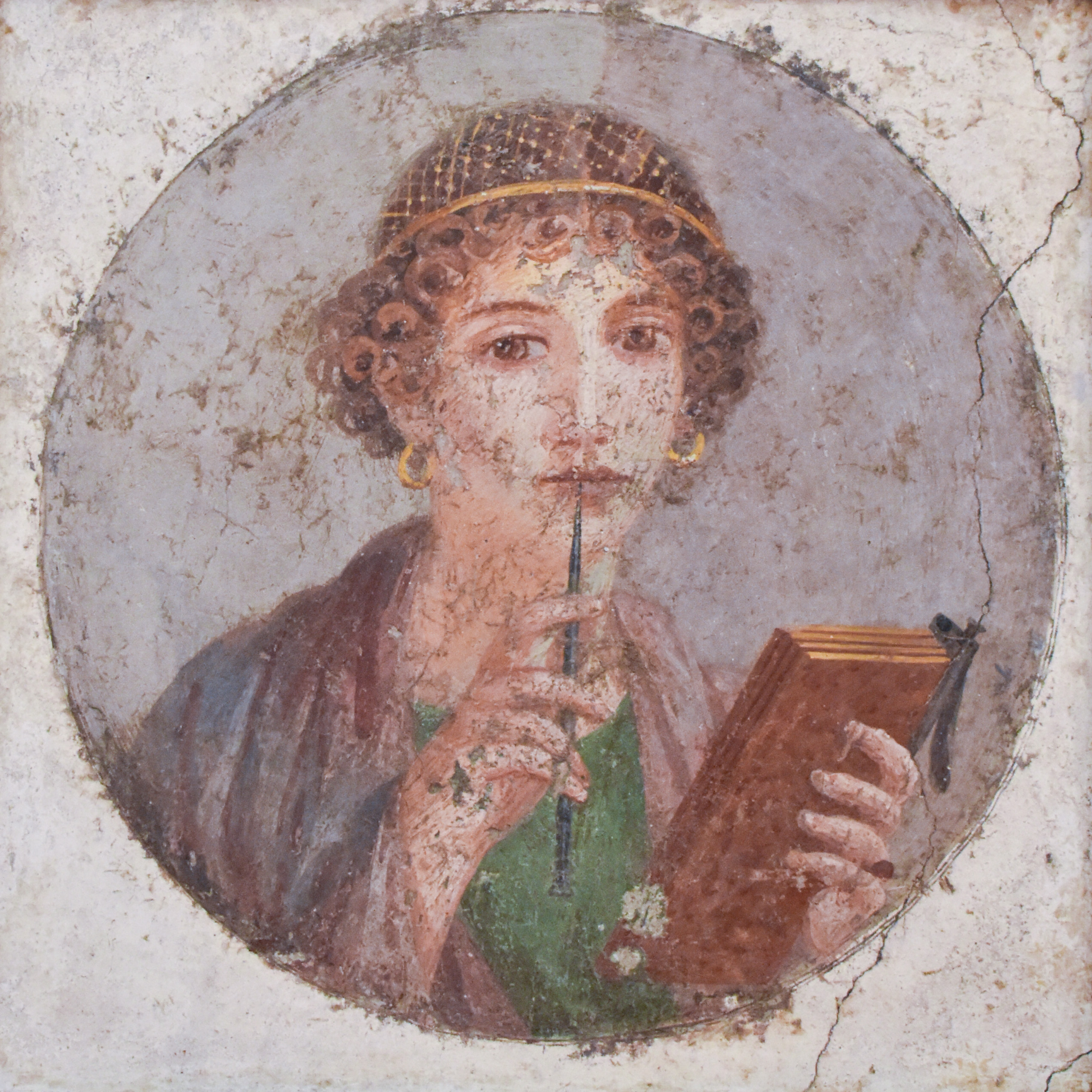
Portrait emphasizing the female subject's literacy, from Pompeii, mid-1st century AD

In ancient Rome, upper class women seem to have been well-educated, some highly so, and were sometimes praised by male historians of the time for their learning and cultivation. Cornelia Metella, for instance, was distinguished for her knowledge of geometry, literature, music, and philosophy. In the wall paintings of Pompeii, women are more likely than men to be pictured with writing implements. Some women had sufficient knowledge of Roman law and oratorical training to conduct court cases on their own behalf, or on behalf of others. Among occupations that required education, women could be scribes and secretaries, calligraphers, and artists.

Some and perhaps many Roman girls went to a ludus. Boys and girls were educated either together or with similar methods and curriculum. One passage in Livy's history assumes that the daughter of a centurion would be in school; the social rank of a centurion was typically equivalent to modern perceptions of the "middle class". Girls as well as boys participated in public religious festivals, and sang advanced choral compositions that would require formal musical training.

==== Medieval period ====
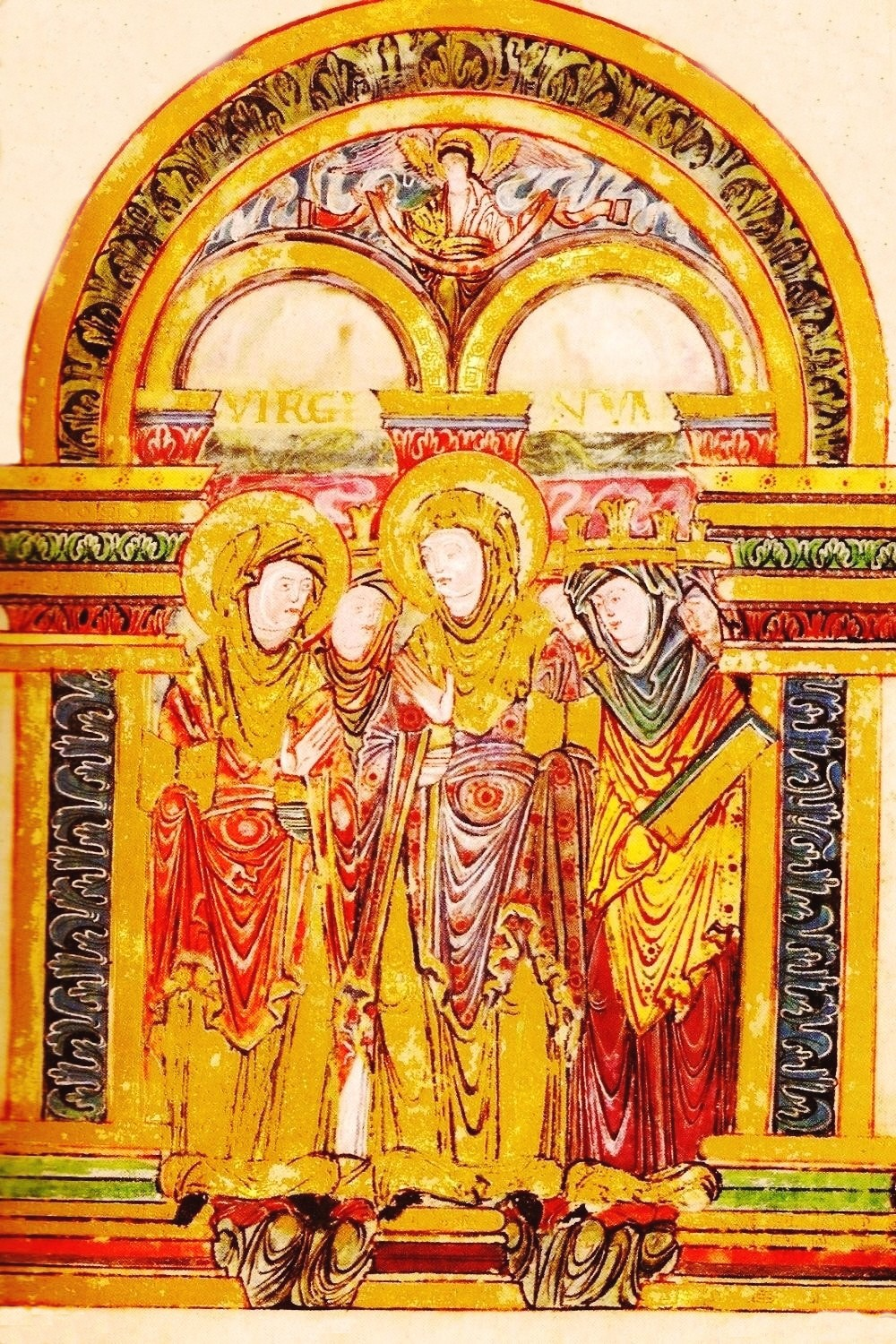
Page from an illuminated manuscript from the late 10th century. The three nuns in front are all holding books, and the middle one appears to be teaching, gesturing to make a point.

Medieval education for females was typically tied to a convent. Research has uncovered that several early women educators were in charge of schools for girls:

St. Ita of Ireland—died 570 AD. Founder and teacher of a co-ed school for girls and boys at her monastery of Cell Ide. Several important saints studied under her, including St. Brendan the Navigator.

Caesaria the Younger—died 550 AD. Successor to the sister of St. Caesarius and abbess of the convent he founded for her nuns, Caesaria the Younger continued the teaching of over a hundred women at the convent and aided in the copying and preservation of books.

St. Hilda of Whitby—died 680 AD. Founder of the co-ed monastery of Whitby (men and women lived in separate houses), she established a center of education in her monastery similar to what was founded by the Frankish nuns. According to the Venerable Bede, "Her prudence was so great, that not only meaner men in their need, but sometimes even kings and princes, sought and received her counsel."

St. Bertilla—died c. 700 AD. Queen Bathild requested her services for the convent she had founded at Chelle. Her pupils founded convents in other parts of western Europe, including Saxony.

St. Leoba—died 782 AD. St. Boniface requested her presence on his mission to the Germans and while there she founded an influential convent and school.

St. Bede the Venerable reports that noble women were often sent to these schools for girls even if they did not intend to pursue the religious life, and St. Aldhelm praised their curriculum for including grammar, poetry, and scriptural study. The biography of Sts. Herlinda and Renilda also demonstrates that women in these convent schools could be trained in art and music.

During his reign, Emperor Charlemagne had his wife and daughters educated in the liberal arts at the Palace Academy of Aachen, for which he is praised in the Vita Karolini Magni. There is evidence that other nobles had their daughters educated at the Palace Academy as well. In line with this, authors such as Vincent of Beauvais indicate that the daughters of the nobility were widely given to education so that they could satisfy the expectations of their future social positions.

During the late Middle Ages in England, a girl could receive an education in the home, in domestic service, in a classroom hosted in a royal or aristocratic household, or in a convent. There is some evidence of informal elementary schools in late medieval towns, where girls may have received some schooling from parish priests or clerks. Near the end of the Middle Ages, references to women as schoolteachers appear in some French and English records. The instruction of girls was usually oral, although instructors sometimes read texts aloud to girls until they could read on their own. Families with the status and financial means could send daughters to nunneries for education outside the home. There, they could encounter a wide range of reading material, including spiritual treatises, theological studies, lives of the fathers, histories, and other books.

In 1237, Bettisia Gozzadini earned a law degree at the University of Bologna, becoming the first woman to graduate university. In 1239 she taught there, becoming first woman believed to teach at a university.

In the late middle ages and early modern Europe, the question of female education had become a commonplace one, in other words a literary topos for discussion. Around 1405 Leonardo Bruni wrote De studies et letteris, addressed to Baptista di Montefeltro, the daughter of Antonio II da Montefeltro, Duke of Urbino; it commends the study of Latin, but warns against arithmetic, geometry, astronomy, and rhetoric. In discussing the classical scholar Isotta Nogarola, however, Lisa Jardine notes that (in the middle of the 15th century), "'Cultivation' is in order for a noblewoman; formal competence is positively unbecoming." Christine de Pisan's Livre des Trois Vertus is contemporary with Bruni's book, and "sets down the things which a lady or baroness living on her estates ought to be able to do."

==== Early modern period ====
In his 1516 book Utopia, Thomas More advocated for women to have the right to education.

Erasmus wrote at length about education in De pueris instituendis (1529, written two decades before); not mostly concerned with female education, in this work he does mention with approbation the trouble Thomas More took with teaching his whole family. Catherine of Aragon "had been born and reared in one of the most brilliant and enlightened of European courts, where the cultural equality of men and women was normal". By her influence, she made education for English women both popular and fashionable. In 1523, Juan Luis Vives, a follower of Erasmus, wrote in Latin his De institutione feminae Christianae. This work was commissioned by Catherine, who had charge of the education of her daughter for the future Queen Mary I of England; in translation it appeared as Education of a Christian Woman. It is in line with traditional didactic literature, taking a strongly religious direction. It also placed a strong emphasis on Latin literature. Also Comenius was an advocate of formal education for women. In fact his emphasis was on a type of universal education making no distinction between humans; with an important component allowed to parental input, he advocated in his Pampaedia schooling rather than other forms of tutoring, for all.

The Reformation prompted the establishment of compulsory education for boys and girls. Most important was Martin Luther's text 'An die Ratsherren aller Städte deutschen Landes' (1524), with the call for establishing schools for both girls and boys. Especially the Protestant South-West of the Holy Roman Empire, with cities like Strassburg, became pioneers in educational questions. Under the influence of Strasbourg in 1592, the German Duchy Pfalz-Zweibrücken became the first territory of the world with compulsory education for girls and boys.

Elizabeth I of England had a strong humanist education, and was praised by her tutor Roger Ascham. She fits the pattern of education for leadership, rather than for the generality of women. When Johannes Sturm published Latin correspondence with Ascham centred on the achievements in humanist study of Elizabeth and other high-ranking English persons, in Konrad Heresbach's De laudibus Graecarum literarum oratio (1551), the emphasis was on the nobility of those tackling the classics, rather than gender.

==== Modern period ====
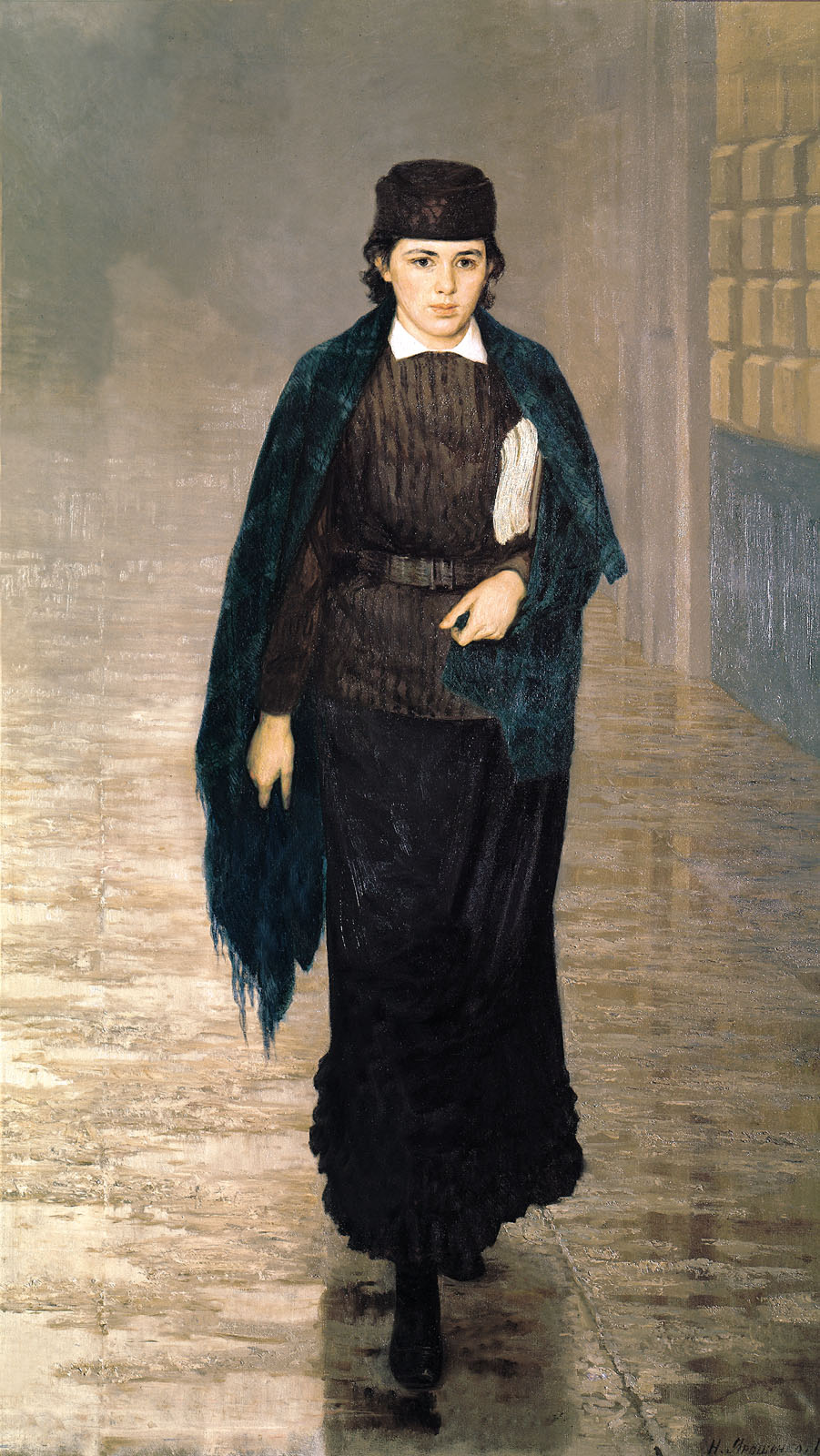
A student of the Bestuzhev Courses in Saint Petersburg, 1880

The issue of female education in the large, as emancipatory and rational, is broached seriously in the Enlightenment. Mary Wollstonecraft, who worked as a teacher, governess, and school-owner, wrote of it in those terms. Her first book was Thoughts on the Education of Daughters, years before the publication of A Vindication of the Rights of Woman.

The historian, Hannah Lawrance (1795–1875), played an important role in nineteenth-century public debate about women's education. Like Catharine Macaulay and Mary Wollstonecraft, she argued that virtue had no sex and she promoted the broad education of women in order to increase their opportunities for employment. But unlike her bluestocking predecessors, she derived her argument from a scholarly reappraisal of women's history.

Laura Bassi, an Italian woman, earned a Ph.D. degree at the University of Bologna in Italy in 1732, and taught physics at the same university. She was the first recorded woman to have a doctorate in science. Working at the University of Bologna, she was also the first salaried woman teacher in a university and at one time she was the highest paid employee. She was also the first woman member of any scientific establishment, when she was elected to the Academy of Sciences of the Institute of Bologna in 1732.

The first state-financed higher education institution for women in Europe, Smolny Institute for Noble Maidens, was established by Catherine II of Russia in 1764. The Commission of National Education in the Polish–Lithuanian Commonwealth, founded in 1777, considered the first Ministry of Education in history, was a central, autonomous body responsible for nationwide, secular and coeducational training. In the late 19th century, in what was then the Russian province of Poland, in response to the lack of higher training for women, the so-called Flying University was organized, where women were taught covertly by Polish scholars and academics. Its most famous student was Maria Skłodowska-Curie, better known as Marie Curie, who went on to win two Nobel Prizes.

Much education was channeled through religious establishments. Not all of these educated women only for marriage and motherhood; for example, Quaker views on women had allowed much equality from the foundation of the denomination in the mid-17th century. The abolitionist William Allen and his wife Grizell Hoare set up the Newington Academy for Girls in 1824, teaching an unusually wide range of subjects from languages to sciences.

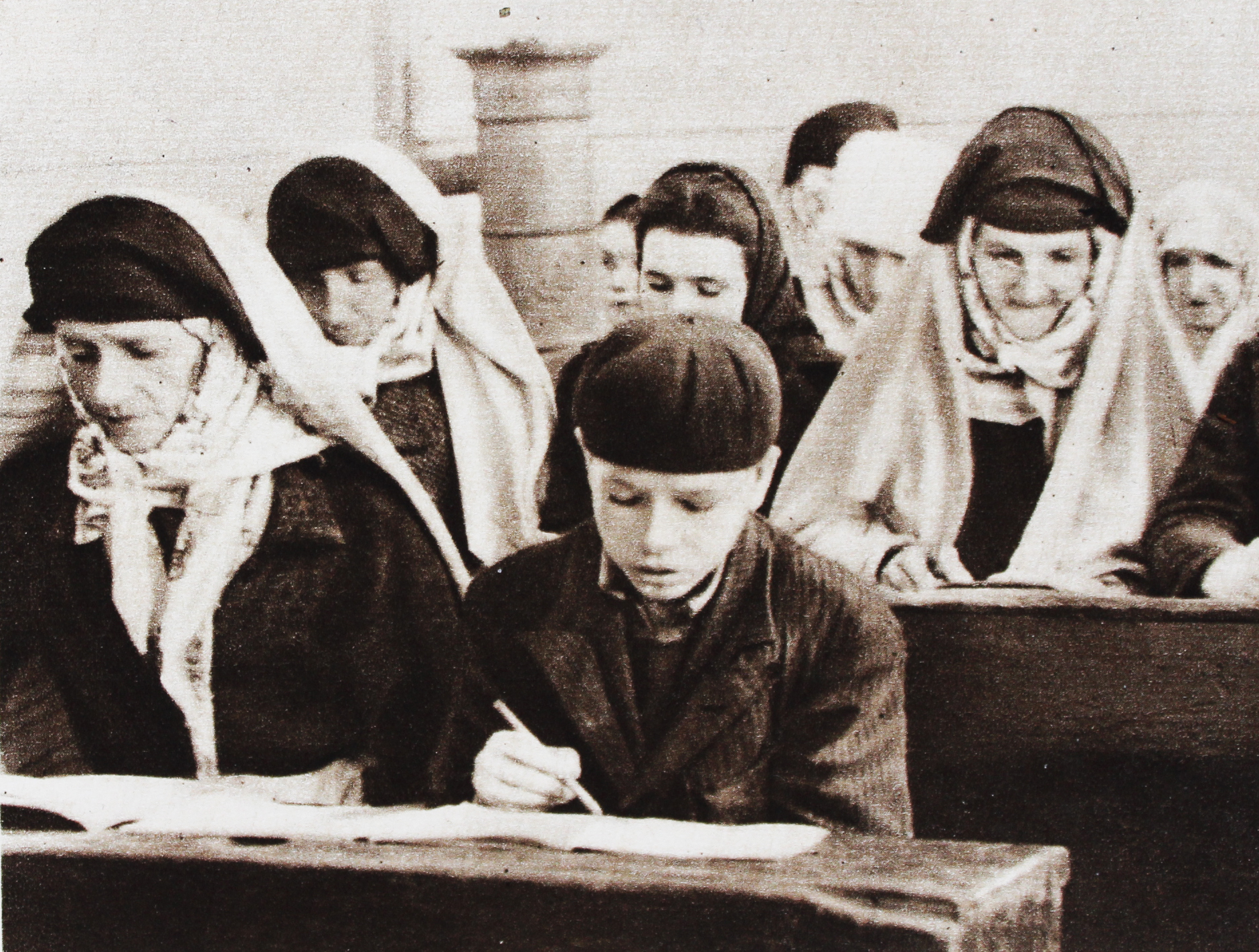
Bosnian Muslim and Christian women learning to read and write in 1948

Actual progress in institutional terms, for secular education of women, began in the West in the 19th century, with the founding of colleges offering single-sex education to young women. These appeared in the middle of the century. The Princess: A Medley, a narrative poem by Alfred Lord Tennyson, is a satire of women's education, still a controversial subject in 1848, when Queen's College first opened in London. Emily Davies campaigned for women's education in the 1860s, and founded Girton College in 1869, as did Anne Clough found Newnham College in 1875. Progress was gradual, and often depended on individual efforts—for example, those of Frances Lupton, which led to the founding of the Leeds Girls' High School in 1876. W. S. Gilbert parodied Tennyson's poem and treated the themes of women's higher education and feminism in general with The Princess in 1870 and Princess Ida in 1883.

Once women began to graduate from institutions of higher education, there steadily developed also a stronger academic stream of schooling, and the teacher training of women in larger numbers, principally to provide primary education. Women's access to traditionally all-male institutions took several generations to become complete.

==== Educational reform ====
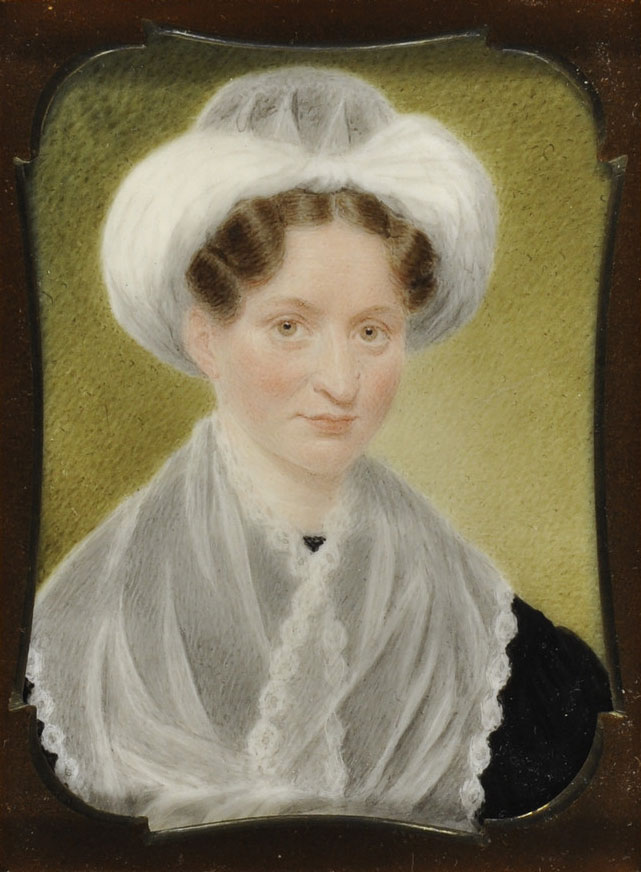
Mary Lyon (1797–1849) founded the first woman's college in the United States.

The interrelated themes of barriers to education and employment continued to form the backbone of feminist thought in the 19th century, as described, for instance, by Harriet Martineau in her 1859 article "Female Industry" in the Edinburgh Journal. Despite the changes in the economy, the position of women in society had not greatly improved and, unlike Frances Power Cobbe, Martineau did not support the emerging call for the vote for practical reasons.

Slowly, the efforts of women like Emily Davies and the Langham group (under Barbara Leigh Smith Bodichon) started to make inroads. Queen's College (1848) and Bedford College (1849) in London started to offer some education to women, and by 1862 Davies was establishing a committee to persuade the universities to allow women to sit for the recently established (1858) Cambridge Local Examinations, with partial success (1865). A year later she published The Higher Education of Women. She and Bodichon founded the first higher educational institution for women, with five students, which became Girton College, Cambridge in 1873, followed by Somerville College and Lady Margaret Hall at Oxford in 1879. Bedford had started awarding degrees the previous year. Despite these measurable advances, few could take advantage of them and life for women students was very difficult.

As part of the continuing dialogue between British and American feminists, Elizabeth Blackwell, the first woman in the U.S. to graduate in medicine (1849), lectured in Britain with Langham support. They also supported Elizabeth Garrett's attempts to assail the walls of British medical education against strong opposition; she eventually took her degree in France. Garrett's successful campaign to run for office on the London School Board in 1870 is another example of how a small band of determined women were starting to reach positions of influence at the level of local government and public bodies.

==== By country ====
===== Denmark =====
Girls were included as pupils in the first attempt of a public elementary school system in 1739, though this attempt was not fully realized until 1814. From the foundation of the J. Cl. Todes Døtreskole in the 1780s, schools for secondary education for females were established in the capital of Copenhagen, though female teachers were only allowed to teach girls or very small boys. One of the first schools for females of any note was the Døtreskolen af 1791, and in the 1840s, schools for girls spread outside the capital and a net of secondary education girl schools was established in Denmark. The first college for women, the teachers seminary Den højere Dannelsesanstalt for Damer, was opened in 1846. In 1875, women were given access to university education.

===== Finland =====
In the late 18th and early 19th centuries, private schools for girls were established in Finland; among the better known were those of Christina Krook, Anna Salmberg and Sara Wacklin, preferred by those who did not wish to send their daughters to schools in Sweden. The private girls' schools were, however, criticized for shallow education of accomplishments, which resulted in girls' education being included in the school reform of 1843. The following year, two Swedish-language state schools for girls was founded in Turku and Helsinki: Svenska fruntimmersskolan i Åbo and Svenska fruntimmersskolan i Helsingfors. This led to the establishment of a net of girls' schools of a similar kind in Finland. At first these schools were reserved for girls from upper-class families.

At this time it was not possible for the girls to pass the baccalaureate and move on to university studies. In 1865, a grammar school made it clear that only girls whose upbringing and manners were impeccable, whose company could not be considered detrimental to others, and who were from "respectable" families could be in that school.

After the first woman in Finland, Maria Tschetschulin, was accepted as a university student by dispensation in 1870, advanced classes and college classes were included in many girls' schools to prepare students for university (by means of dispensation). In 1872, the demand that all students must be members of the Swedish-speaking upper classes was dropped. Women were given the right to teach in grammar schools for girls in 1882.

===== France =====
As was normal in Catholic countries in Europe, girls were normally educated in convent schools for girls operated by nuns, such as Abbaye de Penthemont in Paris. A rare exception was Maison royale de Saint-Louis, founded by Madame de Maintenon in 1684. After the French Revolution, girls' schools became more common, often operated by governesses—a famous pioneer school being that of Jeanne-Louise-Henriette Campan.

France formally included girls in the state elementary education school system in 1836, but girls and boys were only integrated in the lower levels; the secondary education of girls was entrusted to girls' schools managed by nuns or governesses, who lacked necessary qualifications. When women were formally allowed to attend university in France in 1861, for them to qualify was often difficult due to the poor quality of their secondary education. When the problem of unqualified female teachers in girls' secondary education was addressed by a state teacher's seminary for women as well as state secondary education for girls, both of these were still gender segregated. The French school system was not desegregated on the middle secondary education level until the 20th century.

===== Germany =====
Germany was a pioneer in the education of girls. Beginning in the 17th century, schools for girls were opened in both Catholic Southern Germany as well as Protestant Northern Germany. In Catholic Germany, the Catholic Ursulines and Elisabeth sisters established first elementary education schools for poor children and orphans and eventually before 1750, also a type of secondary education girls' schools for wealthy girls called "daughters institutes", which were essentially finishing schools. In Protestant Germany, the great Pietist school innovator August Hermann Francke of Halle founded Gynaeceum, the first girls' school or 'Mädchenschule' in 1698.

The Gynaeceum was followed by many Pietist girls schools in Germany, notably the Magdalenenstift in Altenburg and Johann Julius Hecker's Royal Elisabeth School in Berlin in 1747. In the 18th century, it became common with so called Töchterschule ('daughters' schools') in German cities, supported by the merchant class who wished for their daughters to be given elementary schooling, as well as girls' schools known as Mädchenpensionate, essentially finishing schools for upper class daughters.

In the early 19th century, girls' secondary schools known as höhere Töchterschule ('daughters' high schools') became common; in many German cities later in the century, these schools were given government support, became public and had their education adjusted to become equivalents of boys' high schools. It was not until 1908, when women were allowed to attend university; in the 20th century, the public secondary education system was integrated.

===== Ireland =====
Religion and cultural traditions had an influence on education for both girls and boys in the education system.

Schools in Ireland taught more than academics. They taught about social practices such as manners and conversation skills. Other skills that could help create "proper" adults. Therefore, most schools aimed their female education to help reinforce women's values and proper education for the future mothers of the generation while limiting their educational opportunities compared to their male classmates.

By the 1830s in Ireland, there was an introduction of a national education system to educate the classes who could not afford proper education. Therefore, more schools were built to house incoming students of all social classes. Yet, according to superintendents, there was poor student attendance amongst the children due to their chores, illness, bad weather, or the lack of clothing. Most girls in Irish schools had multiple absences and were the majority of the statistic in school due to duties at home.

Most girls had to leave school early or be home after school to look after the house and their siblings. This would often be overlooked due to the impression that boys' education was more important than their female classmates. However, by 1892, school attendance was made mandatory for students.

Girls could attend a fee-paying school in Ireland from the ages of 7/8 to 17/18 years of age, although, since education can be expensive, they most often put the boys in school, with the impression that they would need it more.

By the second half of the 19th century, female students were criticized for learning other skills, such as artistic skills like the piano and painting. Although the education was often poor, some schools, such as the Protestant and Catholics schools, had the opportunity to teach more of the present-day academics, such as math.

Girls from urban families with parents who did not know how to read or write, still were taught religion and skills of the family trade.

Some families relied on private, in-home education through tutors or siblings. This form of education was usually expensive, and therefore, only middle to upper-classed families could afford it.

===== Russia =====
By the time of the Reforms of Peter the Great in the 18th century, women's education in Russia was almost non-existent, and even noblewomen were often illiterate. With the exceptions of some smaller private schools in the Western European foreign colony of St Petersburg, women's education in Russian started when empress Catherine the Great opened the pioneering state girls' schools Smolny Institute in St Petersburg in 1764 and Novodevichii Institute in Moscow in 1765. The quality of these schools were very high even for Western European standards, and they became a role model for later girls' schools in Russia. They were followed by both private girls' schools as well as by state schools who allowed girls in the lower classes, and in 1792, there were 302 state schools in European Russia with 17,178 pupils, 1,178 of whom were girls.

The state schools however only allowed girls in the elementary education classes, not on the secondary education level, and the majority of the private girls' schools gave a shallow education of accomplishments with focus on becoming a wife and mother or, if they failed in marrying, a seamstress or governess.

In the 1850s the women's movement started in Russia, which were firstly focused on charity for working-class women and greater access to education for upper- and middle-class women, and they were successful since male intellectuals agreed that there was a need for secondary education for women, and that the existing girls' schools were shallow.

From 1857 public secondary education girls' schools, called lyceum or girls' gymnasiums (as the equivalent to the state gymnasium's for boys), were opened in Russia. The Russian school regulation for state secondary girls' schools of 1860 stated that in contrast to state secondary boys' school, which were to prepare students for university, girls were foremost to be educated to become wives and mothers. Since the abolition of serfdom in Russia in 1861, village folk schools were established for the peasantry where boys and girls were given elementary education together as children, but until the Russian Revolution the law mandated that secondary education was always to be gender-segregated in accordance with the school regulation of 1870.

Women were allowed to attend lectures at the university in 1861, but were banned again when they attempted to enroll as students in 1863. When this resulted in women studying in Western Europe (mainly Switzerland), the Guerrier Courses opened in Moscow in 1872 and the Bestuzhev Courses in St Petersburg in 1878: however they did not issue formal degrees, and women were not allowed to attend university until 1905. After the Russian Revolution of 1917, men and women were given equal access to education on all levels.

===== Sweden =====
Around 1800, girls' middle-secondary schools begun to appear, and become more common during the 19th century. By the mid-1970s, most of them had been scrapped and replaced with coeducation.

By a law from the 1570s (1571 års kyrkoordning), girls as well as boys were expected to be given elementary schooling. The establishment for girls' schools was left to each city's own authorities, and no school for girls were founded until the Rudbeckii flickskola in 1632, and that school was to be an isolated example. However, schools for boys sometimes accepted female students at the lowest levels and occasionally even at high levels: Ursula Agricola and Maria Jonae Palmgren were accepted at Visingsö Gymnasium in 1644 and 1645 respectively, and Aurora Liljenroth graduated from the same school in 1788.

During the 18th century, many girls' schools were established, referred to as Mamsellskola (Mamsell School) or Franskpension (French Pension). These schools could normally be classified as finishing schools, with only a shallow education of polite conversation in French, embroidery, piano playing and other accomplishments, and the purpose was only to give the students a suitable minimum education to be a lady, a wife and a mother.

In the first half of the 19th century, a growing discontent over the shallow education of women eventually resulted in the finishing schools being gradually replaced by girls' schools with a higher level of academic secondary education, called "Higher Girl Schools", in the mid-19th century. At the time compulsory elementary schooling for both sexes was introduced in Sweden in 1842, only five schools in Sweden provided academic secondary education to females: the Societetsskolan (1786), Fruntimmersföreningens flickskola (1815) and Kjellbergska flickskolan (1833) in Gothenburg, Askersunds flickskola (1812) in Askersund, and Wallinska skolan (1831) in Stockholm.

During the second half of the 19th century, there were secondary education girl schools in most Swedish cities. All of these were private, with the exception of the women's college Högre lärarinneseminariet in Stockholm from 1861, and its adjacent girls' school Statens normalskola för flickor. The Girls' School Committee of 1866 organized the regulation of girls' schools and female education in Sweden: from 1870, some girls' schools were given the right to offer the Gymnasium level to their students, and from 1874, those girls' schools which met the demands were given governmental support and some were given the right to administer the school leaving exam. This made it possible for women to enroll at universities which had been opened to women in 1870, as female students were not accepted in the same middle schools as male students.

Between 1904 and 1909, girls were integrated in state boys' schools on the secondary levels, which made it possible for girls to complete their elementary and middle level education in a state school instead of having to go to an expensive private girls' school. Finally in 1927, all state secondary schools for boys were integrated, and the private girls' schools started to be transformed into coeducational schools, a process which was completed by 1970.

== Catholic tradition ==
In the Roman Catholic tradition, concern for female education has expressed itself from the days of the Catechetical School of Alexandria, which in the 200s AD had courses for both men and women. Later Church writers such as St. Ambrose, St. Augustine, and St. Jerome all left letters of instruction for women in convents that they either founded or supported. In the Middle Ages, several religious institutes were established with ministries addressing women's education. For medieval examples of convent schools, which are one form of such institutions, see the examples at the section on the medieval period. In the early modern period, this tradition was continued with the Ursulines (1535) and the Religious of the Sacred Heart of Mary (1849). Contemporary convent schools are usually not restricted to Catholic pupils. Students in contemporary convent education may be boys (particularly in India).

== See also ==
- Education reform
- Feminization of poverty
- Gender and education
- Gender digital divide
- Gender inequality in curricula
- Gender mainstreaming in teacher education policy
- Girls' rights
- Girl power
- Right to education
- Society for Promotion of Female Education in the East
- Timeline of women's education
- Women's college
- Women's education and development
- Women in education in the United States
- Women in medicine
- Women's rights
- Women's empowerment

== Sources ==
This article incorporates text from a free content work (license statement/permission). Text taken from Cracking the code: girls' and women's education in science, technology, engineering and mathematics (STEM), UNESCO.

This article incorporates text from a free content work. Licensed under CC BY-SA 3.0 IGO. Text taken from I'd blush if I could: closing gender divides in digital skills through education, UNESCO.
