= Julia Stadius =

Swedish-speaking Finnish writer

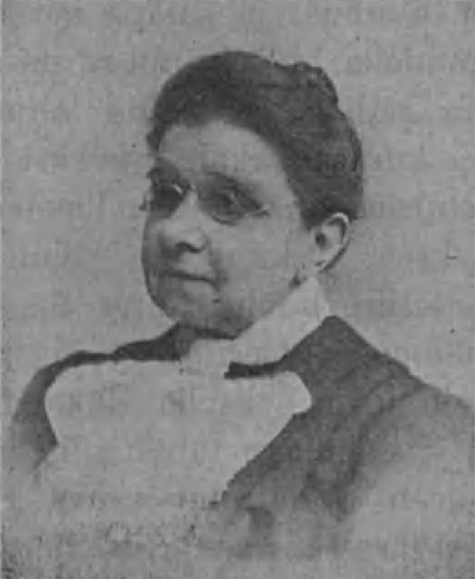
- Born: Julia Tavaststjerna; 11 January 1844; St. Petersburg, Russia
- Died: 22 December 1929 (aged 85); Helsinki, Finland
- Occupation: writer
- Spouse: Knut Alfred Stadius
- Writing career
- Language: Swedish
- Genres: poems, children's fairy tales

Julia Stadius, née Tavaststjerna (11 January 1844, St. Petersburg – 22 December 1929, Helsinki) was a Swedish-speaking Finnish writer.

== Life ==
Julia Tavaststjerna was born on 11 January 1844 in St. Petersburg, where her father Carl Johan Tavaststjerna worked as a teacher at the Cadet College. Her mother was Hilda Maria Tavaststjerna. Her cousin is author Karl August Tavaststjerna, a central figure in Finland-Swedish literature around the turn of the 20th century. In 1850, the family moved to Helsinki where her father took the position of police chief. Tavaststjerna was educated mainly at home and only attended Blomqvist School in Helsinki for a short time.

In 1866, she married her cousin Knut Alfred Stadius with special permission. He served as the High Commissioner of the General Revision Court. The couple had three children, of whom the middle one, Thure Valter Stadius, became deaf at the age of three years old.

Stadius was committed to the rights and social status of the deaf. During the 1890s her house became a meeting place for the deaf. In 1895, Stadius founded Helsinki Deaf Club. She served as the secretary of the Finnish Association of the Deaf and Dumb and as the editorial secretary of the Swedish newspaper for the deaf Tidskrift för döfstumma. After the death of her husband in 1900, Stadius moved with her son Valter first to Hämeenlinna and then to Paris. They returned to Finland in 1904.

Julia Stadius died on 22 December 1929 in Helsinki.

== Work ==
Stadius wrote in Swedish. Among her works are poems, narratives and children's fairy tales. She also wrote and published a magazine for children and a number of children's books.

== Selected works ==
- Prinsessan till Björkeberga (1907)
- Tankar, intryck, hågkomster upptecknade till minne av H[elsingfors] D[övstum] F[örening]s 20-årsdag den 12 februari 1915 (1915)
- Drömmarnas ö och andra sagor (1918)
- Tili Zachris Topelius’ 100-års jubileum den 14 januari 1918 (1918)
- Prinsessan Ödåga (1919)
- Mor Lisas sorgebarn: en berättelse om en finsk dövstum gosse (1922)
