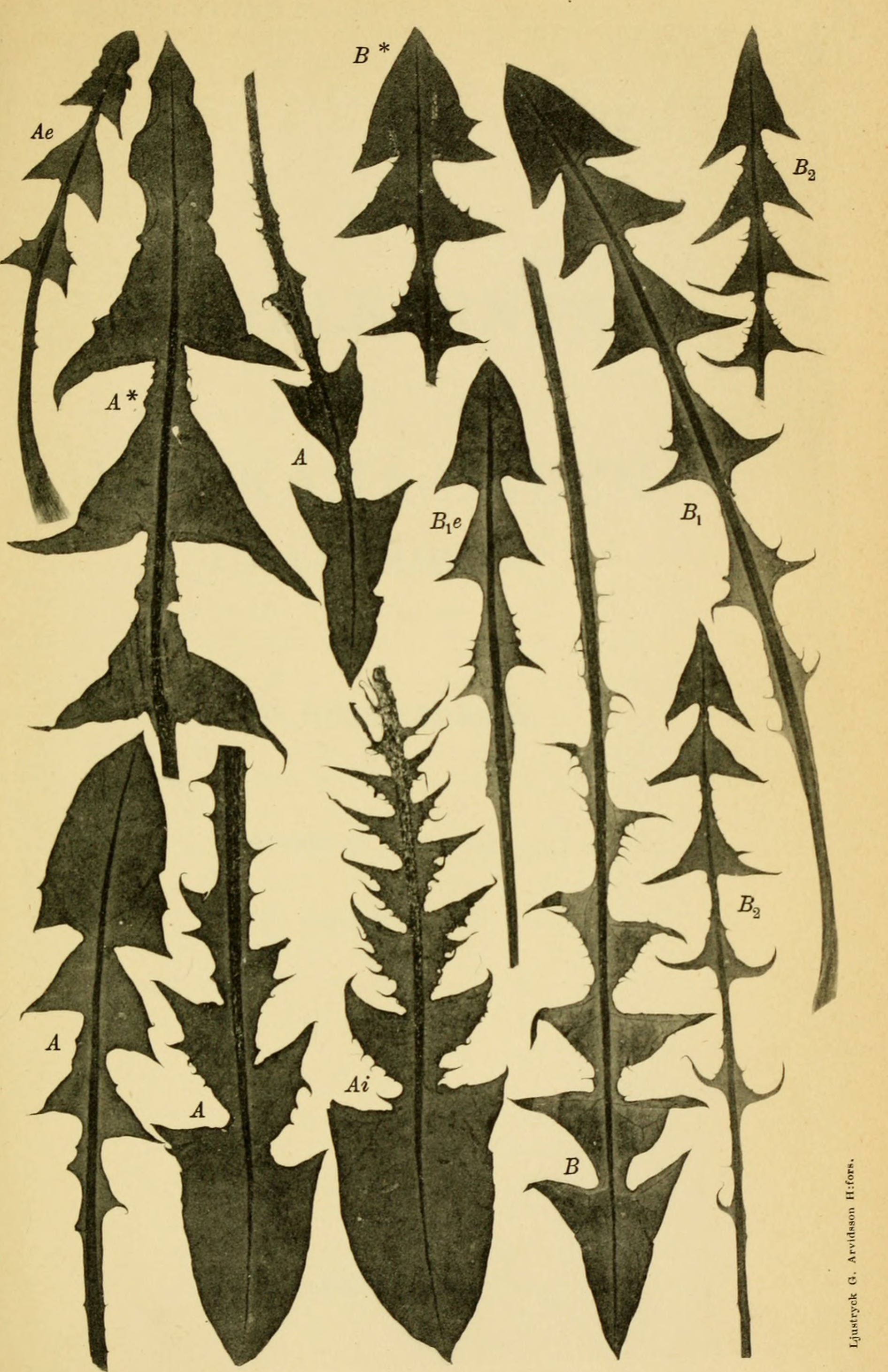
- Leaves of Taraxacum subtile

Scientific classification
- Kingdom: Plantae
- Clade: Tracheophytes
- Clade: Angiosperms
- Clade: Eudicots
- Clade: Asterids
- Order: Asterales
- Family: Asteraceae
- Genus: Taraxacum
- Species: T. subtile

Binomial name
- Taraxacum subtile Markl.

= Taraxacum subtile =

Species of plant

Taraxacum subtile is a species of flowering plant in the genus Taraxacum.

== Description ==
Taraxacum subtile is a perennial herbaceous plant that belongs to the family Asteraceae. It is characterized by its bright yellow flowers, which bloom in early spring and persist throughout the growing season.

== Range ==
Taraxacum subtile is native to Denmark, North European Russia, and Poland.
