= Sara Wacklin =

Finnish teacher and writer (1790–1846)

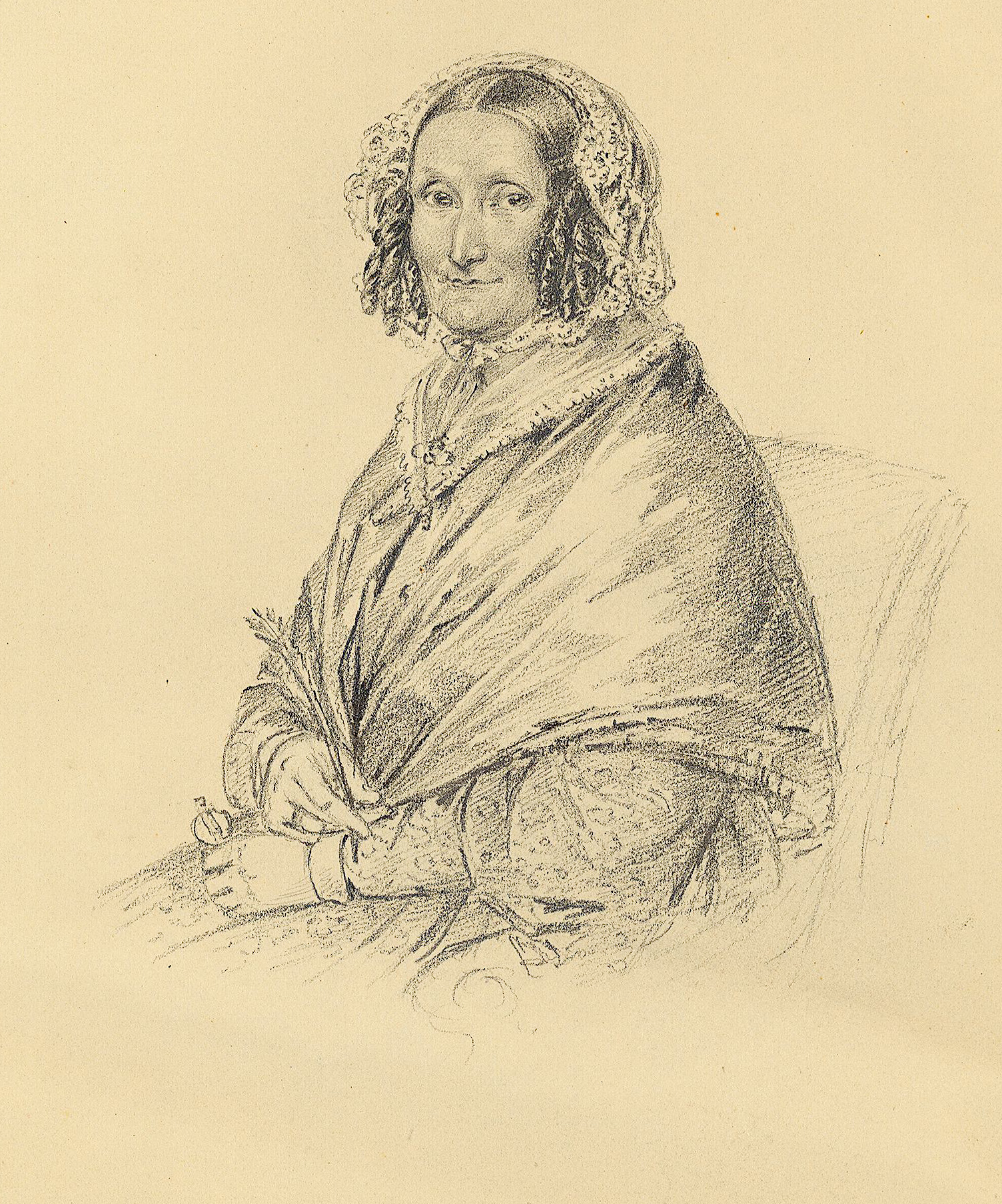
Sara Wacklin by Maria Röhl 1845

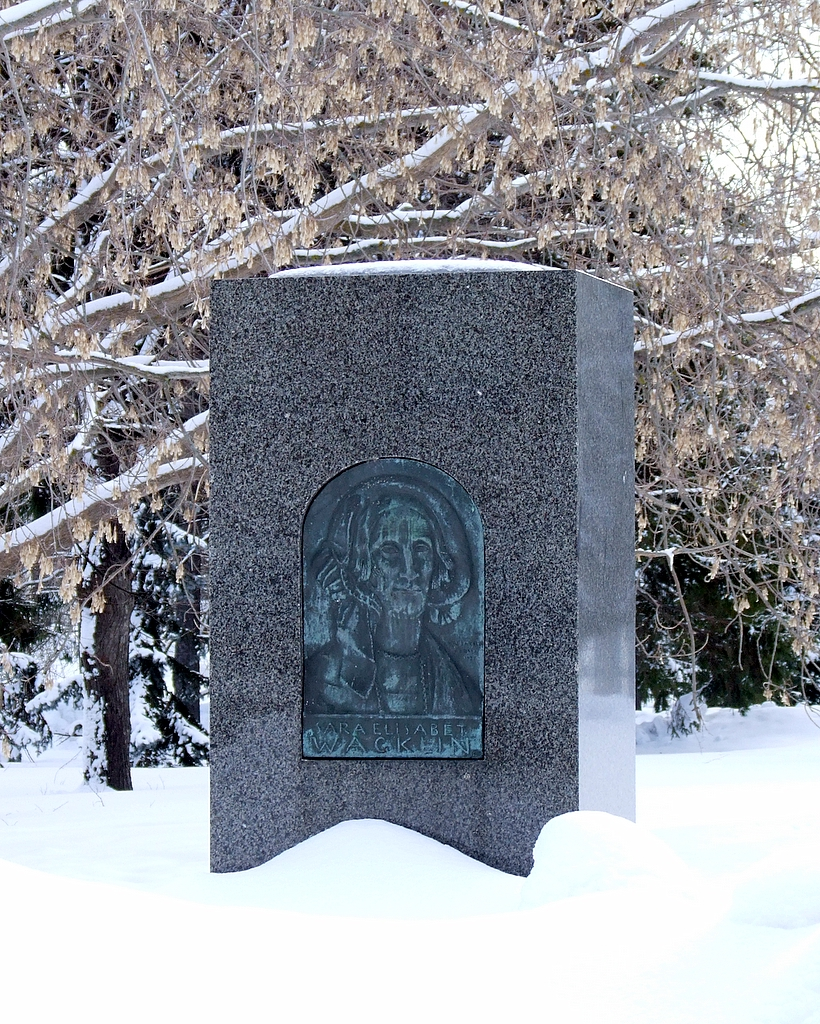
Statue of Sara Wacklin made by Into Saxelin.

Sara Elizabeth Wacklin (26 May 1790 – 28 January 1846) was a Swedish-speaking Finnish educator and writer. She was a pioneer in educating girls, and can be regarded as the first female university graduate in Finland. She can also be regarded as the first female writer in Finland.

== Life ==
Sara Wacklin was born in Uleåborg (Finnish: Oulu), the daughter of the district attorney Zacharias Wacklin (1754–1793) and Katarina Uhlander (1759–1847). After her father died, the economy of the family deteriorated, and after her three brothers left Finland to develop their own careers, Sara Wacklin was left to support their mother. She is described as independent, self-sufficient and intelligent and with a strong will. Due to the reduced fortune of the family, she could not be sent to be educated in Sweden, as was the custom among the Swedish speaking upper classes in Finland, but was forced to be content with an education in an ordinary children's elementary school. To support her mother and earn money to travel to Sweden, she started to work as a teacher in a children's school in Uleåborg in her teens, which was about the only socially acceptable profession for a female not belonging to the working class. Her plans were crushed by the Finnish War of 1808–1809.

In 1813, Wacklin moved to Åbo (Finnish: Turku) where she studied French and music while being active as a governess. Between 1815 and 1819, she worked as a governess in several families in Southern Finland, notably at the Governor of Tavastaland Gustaf Hjärne. In 1819, she finally made her study trip to Sweden, and upon her return, she settled in Uleåborg, where she opened her first school for girls. Her school was a success among the burgher class of Uleåborg, but burned down in the great Uleåborg fire of 1822.

Between 1823 and 1827, Sara Wacklin managed her second school in Åbo together with her business partner Amalia Ertman. While their school was a traditional girls' pension with focus on accomplishments similar to that of Christina Krook, of which there were many in contemporary Finland, it was somewhat more progressive than most, as it had a two-year course and tutored in other languages than French as well as in several subjects also tutored to boys, rather than exclusively accomplishments and household tasks. Her second school burnt down in the Åbo fire of 1827. The following three years, she managed her fourth school for girls in Helsinki, before she closed it and opened her fifth school in Uleåborg in 1830. She is described as an energetic teacher with the writer's talent to give life to her education. She had a strong Christian tone in her school, but in parallel, she kept herself informed of contemporary ideas and believed in the ideas of Rousseau.

In parallel, she was active as a French language teacher. She spent her money on study trips, often to Denmark, Germany and Sweden. In 1835, she closed her school and traveled to France, where she took a course for female teachers at the Sorbonne University in Paris. As such, she became the first female university graduate in Finland. Upon her return, she founded her sixth girls' school in Helsinki. Her school was very popular, and Wacklin became economically independent and an important member of the middle class social life of the city. In 1843, however, the state girls' school Svenska fruntimmersskolan i Helsingfors opened in competition with her school, and her request to found a home for educated women was turned down, which made her close her school and leave Finland.

She retired to Stockholm in Sweden in 1843, where she purchased a house in Köpmangatan 12. It was during her retirement in Sweden that she became active as a writer. In 1844–1845, she published a popular book, Hundrade minnen från Österbotten (A Hundred Memories of Ostrobothnia), with humorous and serious stories from Ostrobothnia in the late 18th and early 19th century. The book was a success in both Sweden and Finland, was given good reviews by critics and gave her a good literary reputation.

Sara Wacklin died of pneumonia in 1846 in Stockholm. She left her estate to Helsinki University.

A plaque is placed at her former home Köpmangatan 12 in Stockholm as a memorial to her.

== Books ==
- Hundrade minnen från Österbotten, Vol. I (1844)
- Hundrade minnen från Österbotten, Vol. II (1844)
- Hundrade minnen från Österbotten, Vol. III (1845)
