= Svenska fruntimmersskolan i Åbo =

Girls' school in Turku, Finland

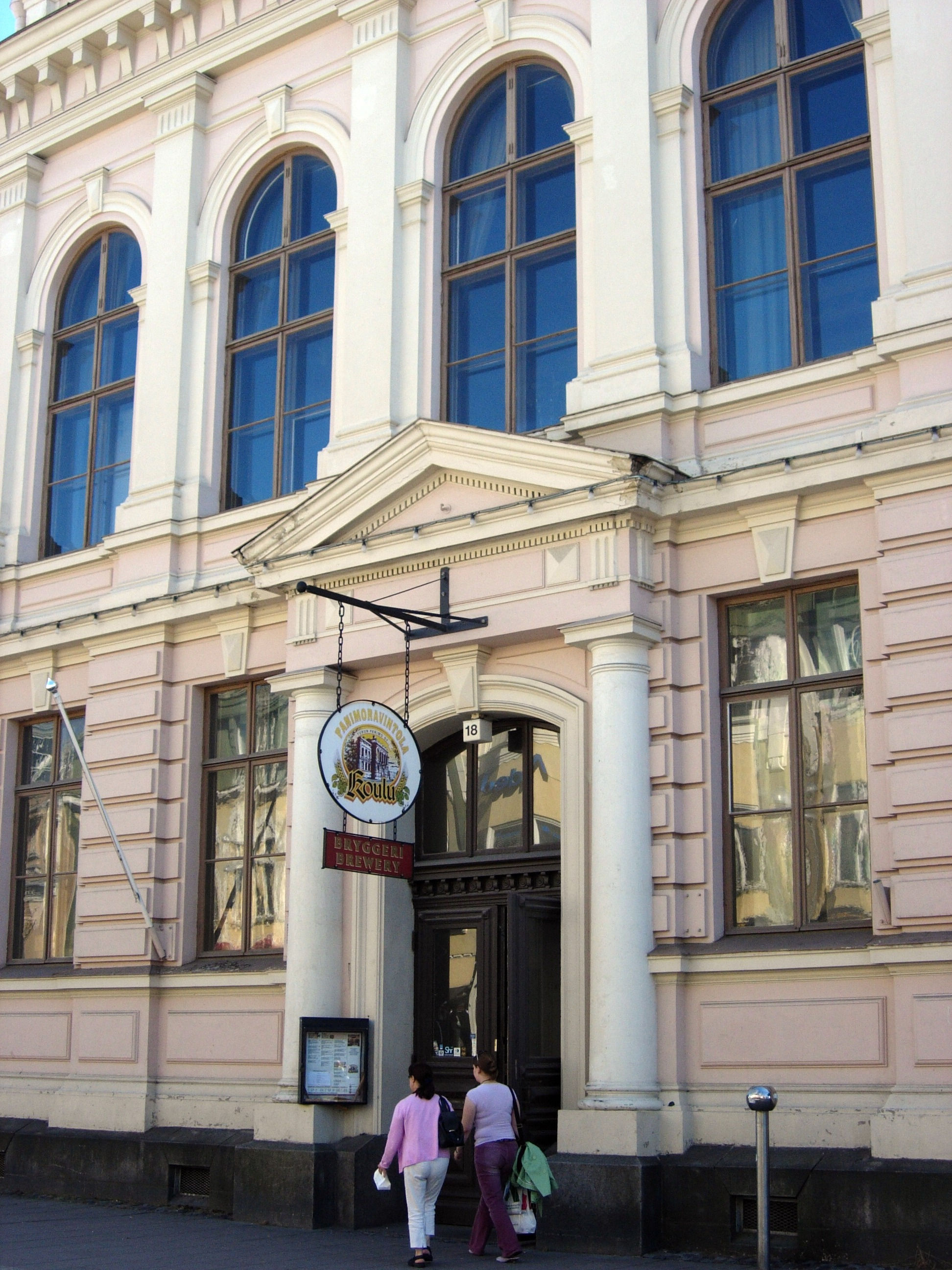
Panimoravintola Koulu facade, the building of the school from 1889 onward

Svenska fruntimmersskolan i Åbo (Swedish Women's School of Åbo) or only Svenska fruntimmersskolan (Swedish Women's School) was a Girls' School in Turku (Swedish: Åbo) in Finland, active from 1844 to 1955. Alongside its equivalent in Helsinki, Svenska fruntimmersskolan i Helsingfors (1844-1974), it was the first state school for females in Finland. From 1919, it was called Svenska flickskolan i Åbo (Swedish Girls' School in Åbo).

== History ==
The sister schools of Åbo and Helsinki were founded as a result of a debate about women's education in Finland. Already in 1793, Jakob Tengström in Åbo Tidningar criticized the schools for girls in Finland for being shallow and useless, and called for girls to be given a more useful education. At that point, the only schools open to females were temporary schools managed by single women who educated upper class students in various accomplishments, such as French and music, with the purpose of becoming "ladies", wives and mothers, such as those of Christina Krook, Anna Salmberg and Sara Wacklin. This debate resulted in the decision that girls should be included in the reform of the school system in 1843, and the following year, the Svenska fruntimmersskolan i Åbo was founded in Turku, and the Svenska fruntimmersskolan i Helsingfors in Helsinki.

The school was founded and financed by the state, after the example of the Fruntimmersskolan i Viborg, and it was followed by similar private schools in smaller cities in Finland in the following decades, especially after the school reform of 1856, often referred to by the name "fruntimmersskolan" in their respective cities, and with a similar pattern. Initially, the school was reserved for Swedish speaking students from the upper- and middle classes, the Swedish language being the language of the upper classes in Finland. It was placed under the supervision of the Lutheran archbishop of Finland, and the education was focused on education the students in subjects considered suitable for women: a large proportion of the lessons were focused on handicrafts, and during lessons by a male teacher, the students were chaperoned in the class room by a female assistant.

After Maria Tschetschulin was accepted as the first woman university student in Finland in 1870, the character of the education changed, and eventually serious secondary education classes were introduced to prepare girls for university. In 1870, the supervision of the church was abolished, in 1872, the demand that all students must be members of the Swedish speaking upper classes was dropped.

When the dispensation for female university students was dropped and women were accepted at the same terms as men in 1915, girls and boys started to receive the same education in the school system, and the girls' schools in Finland started to be changed to coeducation, a development which was completed in the 1970s. In 1955, the Svenska fruntimmersskolan i Åbo was closed, merged with its rival, Heurlinska Skolan from 1861, at that time the largest girl school in Finland, and became the Åbo Svenska Flicklyceum, which in turn was merged with the Katedralskolan i Åbo 1971.
