= Hanna Andersin =

Finnish educator (1861–1914)

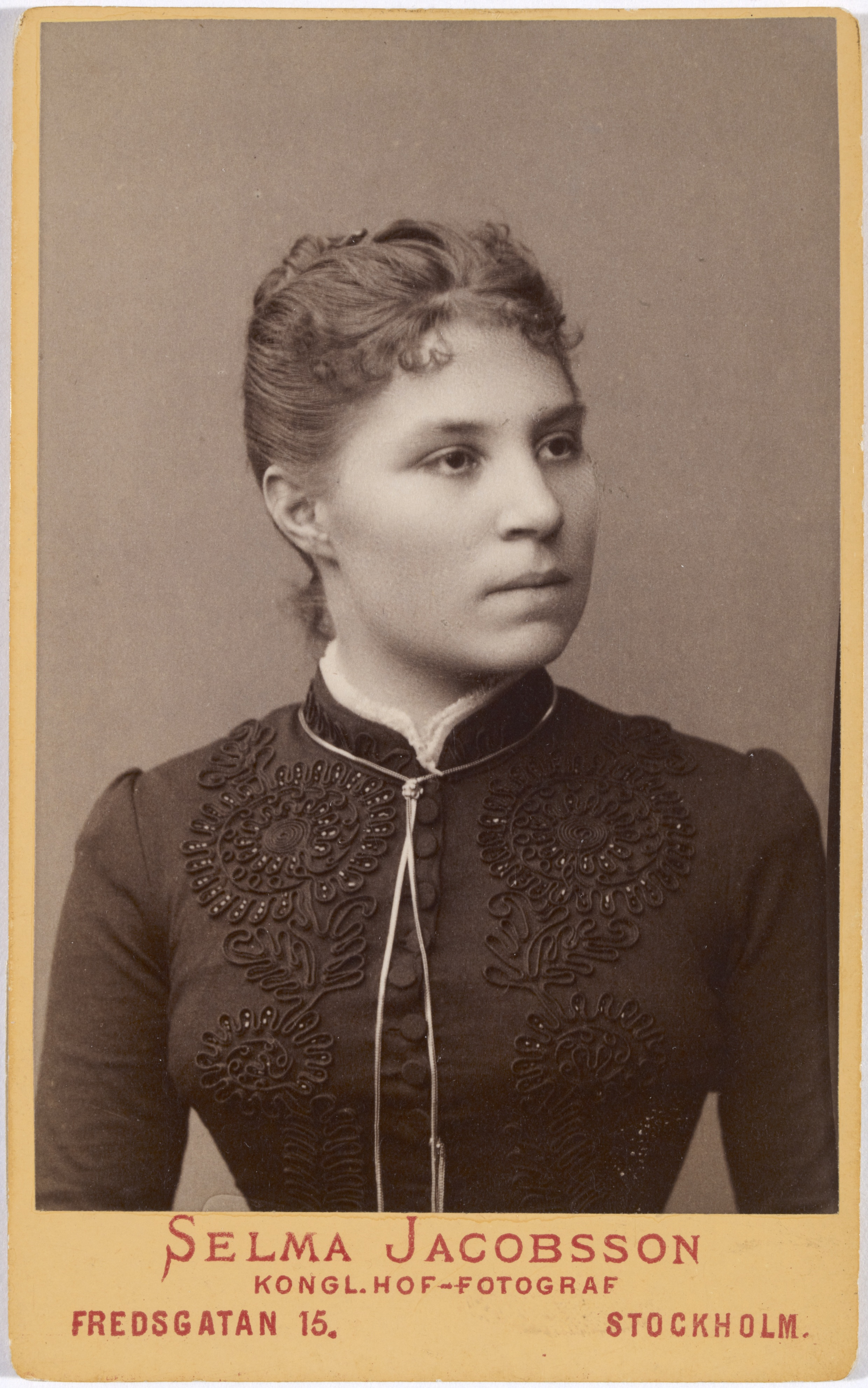
Hanna Andersin. Photography by Selma Jacobsson.

Johanna Ottiliana “Hanna” Andersin (30 August 1861 – 7 April 1914), was a Finnish educator. She was the principal of the first Gymnasium (school) for females in Helsinki in 1907–1914 and is regarded to have played an important part in the history of the education of women in Finland.

== See also ==
- Elisabeth Blomqvist
