= Elisabeth Blomqvist =

Finnish educator (1827–1901)

Anna Charlotta Elisabeth Blomqvist (1827–1901) was a Finnish educator. She was the principal of the state girl school Svenska fruntimmersskolan i Helsingfors (Swedish Girl School of Helsinki) between 1864 and 1898. She was a leading reformer within women's education in Finland, and the founder of the first seminary of female teachers (1861).

== Early life and career ==
Elisabeth Blomqvist was the daughter of the professor Alexander Blomqvist (1796-1848) and the governess Christina Charlotta Harring (1799-1850) in Helsinki. In 1850, her mother and her aunt Anette Harring (d. 1852) opened a school in her home Blomqvistska skolan, to support the family, which was taken over by Elisabeth Blomqvist after their deaths.

In 1856, she made a study trip to France and Germany, and upon her return in 1858, she reopened the Blomqvistska skolan, now with serious educational ambitions. She employed male teachers, as they had the formal education, and her school was progressive and offered six classes and a number of subjects normally only taught at boys schools. At this point, the first state schools for girls had been established in 1844, but there were no educated female teachers.

In 1861, she started the first seminary for the education of female teachers in Finland. However, the competition from the state school for girls in Helsinki was a great obstacle despite her success.

== Educator ==
In 1864, she accepted the post of principal at the state girl school Svenska fruntimmersskolan i Helsingfors which was one of two state schools for females in Finland (the other being Svenska fruntimmersskolan i Åbo.

As the principal of one of only two state schools for females in the country, she was given a key role in the reform of women's education in Finland, and she used her position to speak in favor of progressive reforms in official school meetings and pedagogic assemblies. She opposed the law that only girls from the Swedish speaking upper classes were accepted at the state girl schools, a restriction which was lifted in 1872; she also spoke in favor of illegitimate girls be allowed; and that the Finnish language, which was the language of the poor classes in Finland but unknown by upper and- middle-class women, should be taught to educated women in Finland.

She introduced school outings, supported the reform program of more classes and more subjects for girls, which replaced the old education that had been focused on making the students ideal wives; Blomqvist lamented the common view that the only profession open to educated women was that of a teacher and that women were expected to marry and be a wife and mother and nothing else, and when the first woman, Maria Tschetschulin, was accepted with dispensation at a Finnish university in 1870, she supported the reform to give women access to university education and more professions, a goal which was discussed for decades before finally introduced.

During the 1870s and 1880s, Elisabeth Blomqvist was one of the most active voices and pioneers in favor of women's access to higher education and more professions, and though her activity was much restricted to her school, this made her an important figure in the early Finnish women's movement.

Her old school and its seminar was closed in 1869, but she introduced a seminar for women teachers at the state school in 1868.

== See also ==
- Hanna Andersin
