= Svenska fruntimmersskolan i Helsingfors =

Girls' school in Helsinki, Finland

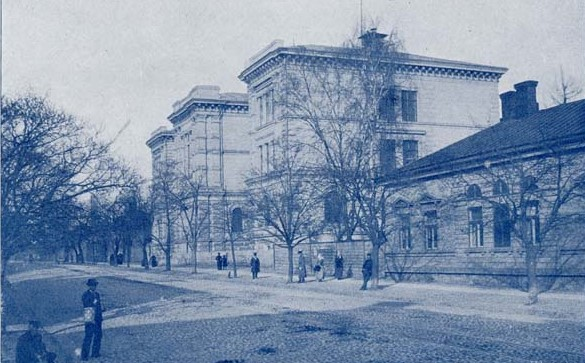
Svenska fruntimmersskolan i Helsingfors, 1892

Svenska fruntimmersskolan i Helsingfors ('Swedish Women's School of Helsinki') or only Svenska fruntimmersskolan ('Swedish Women's School') was a Girls' School in Helsinki in Finland, active from 1844 to 1974. Alongside its equivalent in Åbo (Finnish: Turku), Svenska fruntimmersskolan i Åbo (1844–1955), it was the first state school for females in Finland. It allowed pupils of both genders in 1929, and was dissolved in 1974.

== History ==
The sister schools of Åbo and Helsinki were founded as a result of a debate about women's education in Finland. Already in 1793, Jakob Tengström in Åbo Tidningar had criticized the schools for girls in Finland for being shallow and useless, and called for them to be given a more useful education. At that point, the only schools open to females were temporary schools managed by single women who educated upper class students in various accomplishments, such as French and music, with the purpose of becoming "ladies", wives and mothers, such as those of Christina Krook, Anna Salmberg and Sara Wacklin.

This debate resulted in the decision that girls should be included in the reform of the school system in 1843 and in the following year the Svenska fruntimmersskolan i Helsingfors was founded in Helsinki and the Svenska fruntimmersskolan i Åbo in Åbo. The Svenska fruntimmersskolan i Helsingfors was a pioneer institution. Under Elisabeth Blomqvist, it gradually transformed into a secondary school with the purpose of preparing women for university studies, when they were opened to women.

== Principals ==
- 1844-1863 Amalia Ertman
- 1865-1898 Elisabeth Blomqvist

== Well known teachers ==
- Naima Jakobson, writer
- Gunnar Marklund, botanist
- Karin Westman, school leader

== Alumni ==
- Hanna Ongelin, writer, woman's rights
- Aline Pipping, translator
- Elsa Snellman, artist
- Ellen Thesleff, painter
- Maria Wiik, painter
