= Fruntimmersskolan i Viborg =

Fruntimmersskolan i Viborg (English: The Women's School in Viborg), also called Töchterschule in German (lit. 'The Daughters' School'), was a Girls School in Viborg in Russian Finland, active from 1788 until 1937. It was the first school for females in Finland, and the first public secondary girls' school in the Nordic countries.

== History ==
The school was founded in 1788 in the then Russian city of Viborg as a German school for boys, with a separate class for girls. The model was the Petrischule in Saint Petersburg. In 1805, the girls' school was given its own administration and the German name Töchterschule. From circa 1800, it came to be regarded as a teachers' training seminary for female teachers, and women who were active as school teachers around Saint Petersburg, Southern Finland and the Baltics were often trained at this school or one of its equivalents in the area. The school was reorganised in 1842 as Fruntimmersskolan i Viborg. It was known by a Swedish name because the Swedish language was the language of the elite in Finland.

After the foundation of this school, several similar schools for girls were founded around Finland modelled after it, such as those in Fredrikshamn, Kexholm and Nyslott. These schools were all founded in parts of Finland which belonged to Russia at the time. The first state secondary schools for females in Finland, founded in Åbo and Helsinki in 1844, were modelled after this school. The first principal of the Svenska fruntimmersskolan i Helsingfors, Amelia Ertmann, was a former student of the Fruntimmersskolan i Viborg.

A new building was begun in 1882 and its 125th anniversary was celebrated in 2007.

== Other sources ==
- https://web.archive.org/web/20140714220809/http://www.uppslagsverket.fi/bin/view/Uppslagsverket/Flickskolor
