= Hannah Lawrance =

English historian and journalist (1795–1875)

Hannah Lawrance (1795 – 20 November 1875 in Barnsbury Park, Middlesex) was an English historian and journalist.

Lawrance contributed articles to Household Words and Blackwood's Magazine and reviewed historical works for The Athenaeum. For Hood's Magazine she wrote "historical tales set in various periods of English history".

She is famous for her two books Historical Memoirs of the Queens of England, from the Commencement of the Twelfth Century (1838) and The History of Woman in England, and Her Influence on Society and Literature, from the Earliest Period (1843). The two histories "not only rediscovered the lives of medieval women, but also emphasized the significance of women's patronage to the development of British culture."

Her emphasis on women's contribution to public life complemented the Whig-nationalist narrative and secured her a high reputation across a range of political periodicals. Above all, it appealed to other liberal reformers such as Thomas Hood, Charles Wentworth Dilke, and Robert Vaughan, who shared Lawrance's commitment to social reform and helped to secure a wide audience for her historical perspective.

She advocated equal education for women and argued for a favourable view of the intelligence and activity of the women in England's medieval convents.

Hannah Lawrance is one of eight critics dealt with in the book Women Reviewing Women in Nineteenth-Century Britain by Joanne Wilkes.

== Selected publications ==
- Lawrance, Hannah (1838). Historical Memoirs of the Queens of England, from the Commencement of the Twelfth Century. London: Edward Moxon.
- Lawrance, Hannah (1843). The History of Woman in England, and Her Influence on Society and Literature, from the Earliest Period. London: Henry Coburn.
