= Female education in STEM =

Percentage of female students enrolled in engineering, manufacturing and construction programmes in higher education in different parts of the world

Female education in STEM refers to child and adult female representation in the educational fields of science, technology, engineering, and mathematics (STEM). In 2024, 35% of students in STEM fields were women.

The organization UNESCO has stated that this gender disparity is due to discrimination, biases, social norms and expectations that influence the quality of education women receive and the subjects they study. UNESCO believes that having more women in STEM fields is desirable because it would help bring about sustainable development but also believes that more women in STEM study and careers would help ensure that technological design is not inbuilt with negative gender stereotypes

== Current status of girls and women in STEM education ==
=== Overall trends in STEM education ===
Percentage of students that take advanced courses in mathematics and physics, by sex, Grade 12.

Gender differences in STEM education remain a global issue. This is widely understood to be influenced by society and cultural factors. Including gender norms, expectation's, access to resources, and the availability of role models. Girls appear to lose interest in STEM subjects with age, particularly between early and late adolescence. This decreased interest affects participation in advanced studies at the secondary level and in higher education.

Globally, women represent 35% of graduates in STEM fields, and this share hasn't changed by much in recent years. However, participation can vary by subject. Women are more strongly represented in life sciences and health-related fields, but tend to be less represented in engineering, computer science, physics, and information and communication technologies. Differences are also observed by disciplines, with female enrollment lowest in manufacturing and construction, natural science, mathematics and statistics and ICT fields. Significant regional and country differences in female representation in STEM studies can be observed, though, suggesting the presence of contextual factors affecting girls' and women's engagement in these fields. Women are also underrepresented in the STEM workforce, particularly in senior and leadership roles. Women also leave STEM disciplines in disproportionate numbers during their higher education studies, in their transition to the world of work and even in their career cycle.

=== Learning achievement in STEM education ===
In Chile, as in many countries, STEM fields of study are dominated by men

Data on gender differences in learning achievement present a complex picture, depending on what is measured (subject, knowledge acquisition against knowledge application), the level of education/age of students, and geographic location. Overall, women's participation has been increasing, but significant regional variations exist. For example, where data are available in Africa, Latin America and the Caribbean, the gender gap is largely in favor of boys in mathematics achievement in secondary education. In contrast, in the Arab States, girls perform better than boys in primary and secondary education. As with the data on participation, national and regional variations in data on learning achievement suggest the presence of contextual factors affecting girls' and women's engagement in these fields. Girls' achievement seems to be stronger in science than mathematics and where girls do better than boys, the score differential is up to three times higher than where boys do better. Girls tend to outperform boys in certain sub-topics such as biology and chemistry but do less well in physics and earth science.

The gender gap has fallen significantly in science in secondary education among TIMSS trend countries: 14 out of 17 participating countries had no gender gap in science in 2015, compared to only one in 1995. However, the data are less well known outside of these 17 countries. The gender gap in boys' favor is slightly bigger in mathematics but improvements over time in girls' favor are also observed in certain countries, despite the important regional variations. Gender differences are observed within mathematical sub-topics with girls outperforming boys in topics such as algebra and geometry but doing less well in "number". Girls' performance is stronger in assessments that measure knowledge acquisition than those measuring knowledge application. Country coverage in terms of data availability is quite limited while data are collected at a different frequency and against different variables in the existing studies. There are large gaps in our knowledge of the situation in low- and middle-income countries in sub-Saharan Africa, Central Asia, and South and West Asia, particularly at the secondary level.

== Factors influencing girls' and women's participation and achievement in STEM education ==
According to PISA 2015 results 4.8 % of boys and 0.4 % of girls expect an ICT career

According to UNESCO, there are multiple and overlapping factors which influence girls' and women's participation, achievement and progression in STEM studies and careers, all of which interact in complex ways, including:

- Individual level: biological factors that may influence individuals' abilities, skills, and behaviour such as brain structure and function, hormones, genetics, and cognitive traits like spatial and linguistic skills. It also considers psychological factors, including self-efficacy, interest and motivation.
- Family and peer level: parental beliefs and expectations, parental education and socioeconomic status, and other household factors, as well as peer influences.
- School level: factors within the learning environment, including teachers' profile, experience, beliefs and expectations, curricula, learning materials and resources, teaching strategies and student teacher interactions, assessment practices, and the overall school environment.
- Societal level: social and cultural norms related to gender equality, and gender stereotypes in the media.

=== Individual level ===
Individual level

The question of whether there are differences in cognitive ability between men and women has long been a topic of debate among researchers and scholars. Research has produced mixed feelings regarding differences in cognitive between men and women, with some studies finding no consistent differences in learning outcomes based on sex.

Loss of interest has been the major reason cited for girls opting out of STEM. However, more recent research highlights the role of socialization processes and gender stereotypes in shaping these choices. Gender stereotypes that communicate the idea that STEM studies and careers are male domains can negatively affect girls' interest, engagement, and achievement in STEM, and may discourage them from pursuing STEM careers. Girls who assimilate such stereotypes have lower levels of self-efficacy and confidence in their ability than boys. Self-efficacy affects both STEM education outcomes and aspirations for STEM careers to a considerable extent. In recent years, more women have been majoring in STEM, although we still continue to witness vast imbalances between men and women studying math, engineering, or science.

=== Family and peer level ===
Parents, including their beliefs and expectations, play an important role in shaping girls' attitudes towards, and interest in, STEM studies. Parents with traditional beliefs about gender roles and who treat girls and boys unequally can reinforce stereotypes about gender and ability in STEM. Parents can also have a strong influence on girls' STEM participation and learning achievement through the family values, environment, experiences, and encouragement that they provide. Some research finds that parents' expectations, particularly the mother's expectations, have more influence on the higher education and career choices of girls than those of boys. Higher socio-economic status and parental educational qualifications are associated with higher scores in mathematics and science for both girls and boys. Girls' science performance appears to be more strongly associated with mothers' higher educational qualifications, and boys' with their fathers'. Family members with STEM careers can also influence girls' STEM engagement. The broader socio-cultural context of the family can also play a role. Factors such as ethnicity, language used at home, immigrant status, and family structure may also have an influence on girls' participation and performance in STEM. Peers can also impact on girls' motivation and feeling of belonging in STEM education. Influence of female peers is a significant predictor of girls' interest and confidence in mathematics and science.

=== School level ===
Qualified teachers with specialisation in STEM can positively influence girls' performance and engagement with STEM education and their interest in pursuing STEM careers. Female STEM teachers often have stronger benefits for girls, possibly by acting as role models and by helping to dispel stereotypes about sex-based STEM ability. Teachers' beliefs, attitudes, behaviours, and interactions with students, as well as curricula and learning materials, can all play a role as well. Opportunities for real-life experiences with STEM, including hands-on practice, apprenticeships, career counselling, and mentoring can expand girls' understanding of STEM studies and professions and maintain interest. Assessment processes and tools that are gender-biased or include gender stereotypes may negatively affect girls' performance in STEM. Girls' learning outcomes in STEM can also be compromised by psychological factors such as mathematics or test anxiety.

The confidence of a female teacher in STEM subjects also has a strong impact on how well female students will perform in those subjects in the elementary school classroom. For example, female elementary teachers with anxiety around math will negatively affect the achievement of their female students in math. Correlations have been found between gender bias in female elementary students and their achievement in mathematics. Those who had lower achievement over time have also been found to believe that boys are inherently better at mathematics than girls.

=== Societal level ===
Cultural and social norms influence girls' perceptions about their abilities, roles in society and career and life aspirations. The degree of gender equality in wider society influences girls' participation and performance in STEM. To inspire and create an environment that is welcoming to girls, it is important to encourage them to pursue STEM areas from an early age in their education. In countries with greater gender equality, girls tend to have more positive attitudes and confidence about mathematics, and the gender gap in achievement in the subject is smaller. Additionally, in some countries there were more women receiving computer science degrees than men. That was primarily because a computer science degree was seen as indoor work. When the job title was adjusted to sound less masculine and more geared towards relationship building, females appeared to be more likely to enter the STEM field. Gender stereotypes portrayed in the media are internalised by children and adults and affect the way they view themselves and others. Media can perpetuate or challenge gender stereotypes about STEM abilities and careers.

=== Effects of gender disparities ===
The long-term effects of gender stereotypes relating to women's ability to succeed in STEM may contribute to lower self-confidence and perceptions of ability in fields where men are the majority. These perceptions can influence participation and engagement in STEM education and careers. Working in environments where men outnumber women, and where women may face lower expectations from colleagues can negatively affect performance and workplace experiences. Such conditions may also contribute to feelings of isolation and a reduced sense of belonging. This in part is due to the heuristic representativeness – when people do not look the part, others are more critical of them. In a heavily male populated environment, men are more critical of women because they do not appear how the abstract representation in STEM fields typically appear. A study demonstrating the effects of construal level priming conditions between men and women, concluded that high construal levels facilitate the use of representativeness heuristic. In contrast, low construal conditions portrayed a decrease in the use of representativeness heuristic.

== Possible solutions to reduce gender gap ==
- Inclusive STEM approaches such as Problem-Based Learning (PBL) and personalization of learning could generate solutions to lower gender disparities in STEM.
- Students' intellectual engagement and success can develop and improve as a result of the instructor's gender. Gender disparities decrease when a course is taught by a female instructor.
- Increasing awareness about gender biases in STEM careers can also reduce the gender gap.

== Hybrid exhibition by UNESCO ==
Creative Resilience: Art by Women in Science is a multi–media exhibition and accompanying publication, produced in 2021 by the Gender Section of the United Nations Educational, Scientific and Cultural Organization (UNESCO). The project aims to give visibility to women, both professionals and university students, working in science, technology, engineering and mathematics (STEM). With short biographical information and graphic reproductions of their artworks dealing with the COVID-19 pandemic and accessible online, the project provides a platform for women scientists to express their experiences, insights, and creative responses to the pandemic.

== Sources ==
This article incorporates text from a free content work (license statement/permission). Text taken from Cracking the code: girls' and women's education in science, technology, engineering and mathematics (STEM), 23, 37, 46, 49, 56, 58, UNESCO, UNESCO.
