= Joanne Wilkes =

New Zealand professor of English literature

Joanne Claire Wilkes
- Born: 1956 (age 69–70); Sydney
- Education: University of Sydney; University of Oxford
- Occupation: Professor of English literature
- Scientific career
- Thesis: The treatment of the recent past in nineteenth-century fiction, with particular reference to George Eliot (1984)

Joanne Claire Wilkes is a New Zealand professor of English literature.

== Academic career ==
Wilkes did an undergraduate degree at the University of Sydney and a DPhil at the University of Oxford in 1984. She then taught at Monash University in Melbourne and then the University of Auckland. She became a professor in 2013. She specialises in women writers whose recognition has faded.

== Selected works ==
- Lord Byron and Madame de Staël born for opposition
- Women reviewing women in nineteenth-century Britain the critical reception of Jane Austen, Charlotte Brontë and George Eliot
- The works of Elizabeth Gaskell
