= Get Water! =

2013 video game

- Developer(s): Decode Global Studio
- Engine: Unity
- Platform(s): iOS, Android
- Release: March 22, 2013 (iOS); March 22, 2014 (Android)
- Genre(s): Educational, Endless runner

Get Water! is a mobile game about the water scarcity in India and South Asia, and the effects it has on girls' education. It is developed by the Montreal-based start-up Decode Global Studio, with the goal to create an educational game which is also entertaining and challenging to play. The game was originally released for iOS on 22 March 2013, on World Water Day, and was ported to Android a year later for World Water Day 2014.

== Story ==
Maya is a girl who loves going to school and learning new things, but as the village's water pump is broken she keeps getting pulled out of school to get water for her family. The faster Maya can collect water, the faster she can get back to school to learn more. Throughout the story, she gets help from her mother and other people in the village, who want to make it easier for her to collect water and help her get an education.

== Gameplay ==
Maya has to collect enough water before she can go back to school.

Get Water is a side-scrolling endless runner with story elements. The player helps Maya collect water and other collectibles, as well as avoiding enemies, by drawing a line she can surf on. In addition to controlling Maya's movements the player can tap on the screen to make Maya throw a boomerang to fend off enemies who will try to break her water pot. By collecting water the player unlocks new chapters in Maya's story, shown as still-image videos, and Maya learns new skills so she can collect water faster and protect it better.

== Educational aspect ==
The story highlights the effect water scarcity has on girls' education in slums and rural areas of India. After each run the player gets additional information about water scarcity, how it is used nowadays, and how to conserve it in everyday life. In addition to the information found in the game, a six-part lesson plan for 4-6 grade teachers is available on the game's website in PDF format to download for free.

== Reception ==
The iOS version of Get Water! is one of the winners of the Create UNAOC 2012 competition.
