= Anna Salmberg =

Finnish educator (1788–1868)

Anna Salmberg (née Brinck; 1788–1868) was a Danish-born Finnish educator. She was the founder and manager of Salmbergska flickpensionen ('Salmberg Pension for Girls'), one of the most famed and fashionable educational institutions for females in Finland in her time.

== Life ==
Anna Salmberg was born in Copenhagen, Denmark, but was raised in the Danish Caribbean, where English became her first language. She married the Finnish sea captain Arvid Abraham Salmberg (died 1809), and moved with him to Finland. She had no children. When she was widowed, she supported herself as a teacher.

In 1823, she founded and managed the Salmberg Pension for Girls in Turku. Since the foundation of the Christina Krook school in the 1780s, there had been a few private girls' schools in Finland, which remained the only secondary education available for females in Finland until the foundation of the Svenska fruntimmersskolan i Åbo and Svenska fruntimmersskolan i Helsingfors (1844). Of these schools, the Salmberg school in Turku, and the school of Baroness von Rosen in Helsinki, were described as the most notable.

Salmberg defended women's right to education. In her correspondence, she expressed the view, that although the women of Finland may be ignorant, it was the fault of their families, and particularly their fathers, for keeping them that way by not providing them with education and then calling them ignorant. As was customary for schools of her kind, most of the education focused on accomplishments, such as drawing, embroidery and etiquette, but her school was recommended for a high level in the subjects, and her school offered more languages than were usual for a girls' school. In addition to French, she also tutored in the English language, at a time when that language was considered more important to learn for men and it was still otherwise unknown in girls' schools in Finland. Her most known students were the writer Fredrika Runeberg and the poet Augusta Lundahl, both of whom studied at her school in 1824–1825. She died in Turku in 1868.
