= Gunnar Marklund =

Finnish botanist

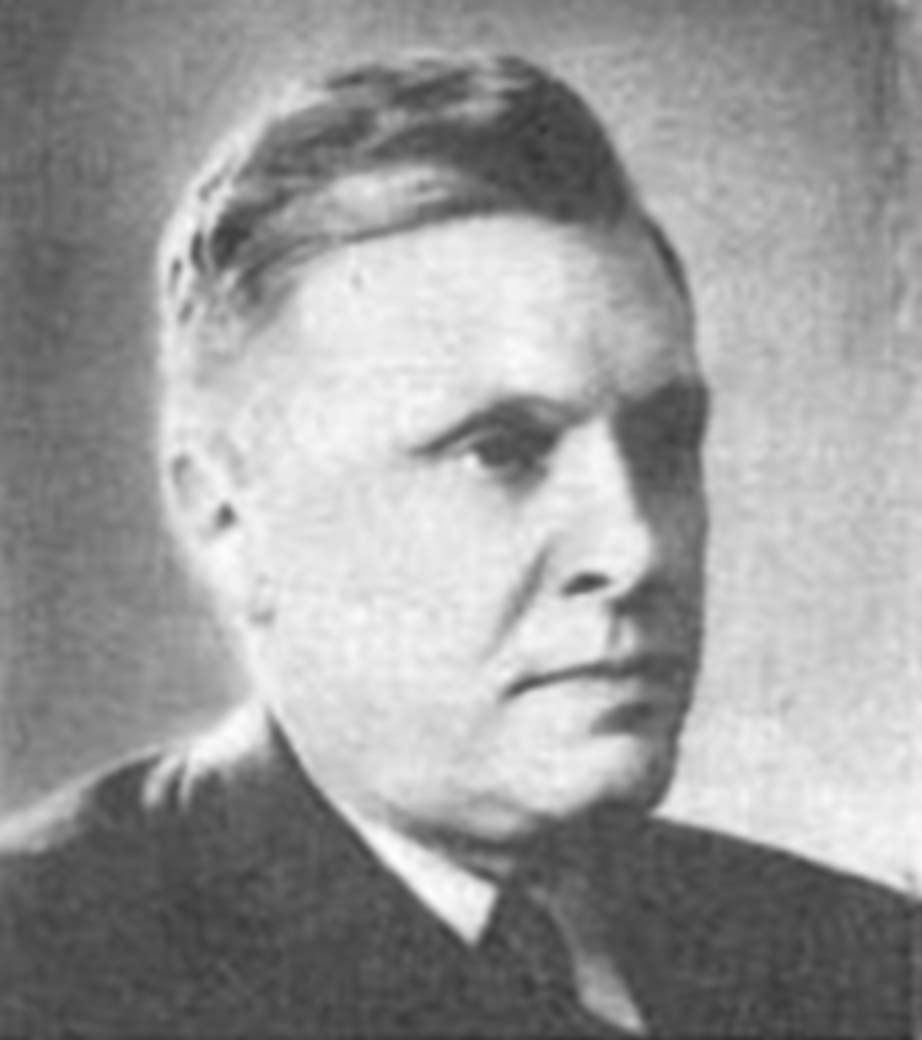
Gunnar Marklund in 1948, a photograph published in a 1963 volume dedicated to him on the occasion of his 70th anniversary

Gunnar Marklund (5 June 1892 in Helsinki – 23 July 1964 also in Helsinki) was a Finnish botanist (taraxacologist and ranunculologist).

== Biography ==
Between 1920 and 1941 he worked as a teacher. In 1937 he received his Ph.D. From 1941 to 1959 he was the curator of the Botanical Museum of the University of Helsinki. In 1963, on the occasion of his seventieth birthday, the 38th volume of the Memoranda Societatis pro Fauna et Flora Fennica was dedicated to him.

== Scientific work ==
=== Overview ===
Gunnar Marklund specialised in two difficult apomictic groups, the genus Taraxacum (dandelions) and the Ranunculus auricomus group (goldilock buttercups). He published four monographs, in which he described about two hundred new species, among them for example Ranunculus mendax (Markl.) Ericsson, as well as several smaller papers.

=== Selected publications ===
- Die Taraxacum-Flora Estlands (1938)
- Die Taraxacum-Flora Nylands (1940)
- Outlines of evolution in the pseudogamous Ranunculus auricomus group in Finland (G. Marklund & A. Rousi, 1961)
- Der Ranunculus auricomus-Komplex in Finnland 1 (...) R. auricomus L. coll. (s.str.) (1961)
- Der Ranunculus auricomus-Komplex in Finnland 2 (...) R. fallax (W & Gr.) Schur, R. monophyllus Ovcz. und R. cassubicus L. (1965, posthumous work)

== Eponymy ==
Ranunculus marklundii (Nannf. & Julin) Ericsson [≡ Ranunculus auricomus ssp. marklundii Nannf. & Julin], a goldilock buttercup species known from Sweden and Estonia, and Taraxacum marklundii Palmgr., a dandelion species described from the Åland Islands, are named in his honour.
