= Christina Krook =

Finnish educator (1742–1806)

Christina Krook (1742 – 1806) was a Finnish educator (living and working in what was then Sweden). She was the principal of a Finishing school for girls in Åbo, regarded as the most successful in Finland at the time.

== Life ==
Christina Krook was the daughter of the official Gustav Krook (1704-1782), and Anna Christina Sund. She never married, and worked as a governess from 1765.

In about 1782, she founded a boarding school in her home in Åbo. It was a typical school of its kind, with focus on accomplishments for girls expected to become wives and mothers and hostesses in high society. She and her sister Lovisa Juliana educated daughters from the rich merchant class and the nobility from the surrounding country side in the French language, etiquette, handicrafts, literature, drawing and dance.

The school was successful in Åbo and Finland, where previously there had been no schools for girls, who had been sent to schools in Sweden. Following her example, schools for girls of the same kind were founded in first Åbo and then in other cities in Finland, notably that of Anna Salmberg. They started a debate about women's education in Finland, which eventually resulted in the founding of the Svenska fruntimmersskolan i Åbo (1844).

Christina Krook died of gout.
