= Lists of girls' schools =

Here are lists of schools which only admit girls, or those which only admit girls at certain levels/years/grades, or those which separate students by gender at certain points (such as the Diamond Schools model), by country.

== Antigua and Barbuda ==
- Christ the King High School, St. John's

== Azerbaijan ==
Former

- Empress Alexandra Russian Muslim Boarding School for Girls

== Bahrain ==
Note that government schools in this country are separated by gender.

- AAli Intermediate Girls
- AAli Primary Girls
- Ain Jaloot Primary Girls
- Aisha Umm Al-Moemeneen Primary Girls
- Al Ahad Al zaher Secondary Girls
- Al Estiqlal Secondary Girls
- Al Marefa Secondary Girls
- Al Wafaa Secondary Girls
- Al-Andalus Primary Girls
- Al-Belad Al-Qadeem Primary Girls
- Al-Budaiyya Primary Intermediate Girls
- Al-Busaiteen Primary Girls
- Al-Daih Primary Intermediate Girls
- Al-Dair Primary Intermediate Girls
- Al-Duraz Intermediate Girls
- Al-Duraz Primary Girls
- Al-Hidd Intermediate Girls
- Al-Hidd Secondary Girls
- Al-Hunaineya Primary Girls
- Al-Khaleej Al-Arabi Primary Intermediate Girls
- Al-Khansa Primary Girls
- Al-Manhal Primary Girls
- Al-Muharraq Primary Girls
- Al-Nabeeh Saleh Primary Girls
- Al-Noor Secondary Girls
- Al-Nuzha Primary Girls
- Al-Orouba Primary Girls
- Al-Qadsiah Primary Girls
- Al-Qayrawan Intermediate Girls
- Al-Qudes Primary Girls
- Al-Rawdha Primary Girls
- Al-Safa Primary Girls
- Al-Salam Primary Girls
- Al-Sanabis Intermediate Girls
- Al-Sanabis Primary Girls
- Al-Sehlah Primary Girls
- Al-Shorooq Secondary Girls
- Al-Tadamon Secondary Girls
- Al-Zallaq Primary Intermediate Girls
- Al-nowaidrat Primary Girls
- Almustaqbal Primary Girls
- Aminah Bint Wahab Primary Girls
- Arad Intermediate Girls
- Arad Primary Girls
- Asma That Alnetaqain Primary Girls
- Bahrain Vocational Secondary
- Bait Al-Hekmah Primary Girls
- Balqees Primary Girls
- Buri Primary Girls
- Busaiteen Intermediate Girls
- Dr.Ghazi Al Gusaybi Secondary Girls
- East Riffa Intermediate Girls
- East Riffa Primary Girls
- Fatima Bint Alkhattab Primary Girls
- Fatima Bint Asad Primary Girls
- Gharnata Primary Girls
- Hafsa Um Almoumineen Primary Girls
- Hajer Primary Girls
- Halima Al-Saadeyya Intermediate Girls
- Hamad Town Intermediate Girls
- Hamad Town Primary Girls
- Hamad Town Secondary Girls
- Isa Town Intermediate Girls
- Isa Town Secondary Girls
- Jidhafs Secondary Girls
- Karrana Primary Girls
- Khadija Al-Kubra Intermediate Girls
- Khawlah Secondary Girls
- Malkiya Primary Intermediate Girls
- Mariam Bint Omran Primary Girls
- Muharraq Secondary Girls
- Nasiba Bint Kaab Primary Girls
- Omaima Bint Al Noaman Secondary Girls
- Qurtoba Intermediate Girls
- Rabiaa Al-Adaweyia Primary Girls
- Ruqaya Primary Girls
- Saar Primary Girls
- Saar Secondary Girls
- Saba Primary Girls
- Safeyia Bint Abdulmuttalib Primary Girls
- Safrah Primary Intermediate Girls
- Sakeena Bint Al-Hussain Primary Girls
- Salmabad Primary Girls
- Sanad Primary Girls
- Shahrakkan Primary Girls
- Shaikha Moza Bint Hamad Al Khalifa Intermediate Girls
- Shaikha Moza Bint Hamad Al Khalifa Primary Girls
- Shaikha Moza Bint Hamad Al Khalifa Secondary Girls
- Sitra Intermediate Girls
- Sitra Primary Girls
- Sitra Secondary Girls
- Sumayia Primary Girls
- Tubli Primary Girls
- Tulaitela Primary Girls
- Um Al-Qura Primary Intermediate Girls
- Um Ayman Primary Girls
- Um Kalthoom Intermediate Girls
- Um Salama Intermediate Secondary Girls
- West Rifaa Secondary Girls
- West Riffa Intermediate Girls
- West Riffa Primary Girls
- Yathreb Intermediate Girls
- Zainab Intermediate Girls
- Zannoobia Intermediate Girls

== Bangladesh ==
Chittagong Division

- Aparnacharan City Corporation Girls' High School
- Bangladesh Mahila Samiti Girls' High School & College
- Chatkhil Government Girls' High School
- Feni Girls' Cadet College
- Dr. Khastagir Government Girls' High School (Chittagong)
- Nawab Faizunnesa Government Girls' High School (Comilla)
- Noakhali Government Girls' High School
- Silver Bells Kindergarten & Girls' High School

Dhaka Division

- Azimpur Girls' High School (Dhaka)
- Bottomley Home Girls' High School
- Holy Cross Girls' High School (Dhaka)
- Holy Cross College, Dhaka
- Kamrunnessa Government Girls High School
- St. Francis Xavier's Girls' High School
- Tejgaon Government Girls' High School
- Viqarunnisa Noon School and College

Khulna Division

- Magura Govt. Girls' High School
- Manirampur Government Girls' High School

Mymensingh Division

- Mymensingh Girls' Cadet College
- Vidyamoyee Govt. Girls' High School (Mymensingh)

Rajshahi Division

- Joypurhat Girls' Cadet College
- Mohanpur Government Girls High School
- Natore Government Girls' High School
- Pabna Government Girls' High School

Rangpur Division

- Debiganj Alodini Government Girls High School
- Debiganj Girls High School
- Dinajpur Government Girls' High School

== Bermuda ==
- Bermuda High School

== Brunei ==
- Pengiran Anak Puteri Hajah Masna Secondary School, Bandar Seri Begawan
- Raja Isteri Girls' High School, Bandar Seri Begawan
- Raja Isteri Pengiran Anak Hajah Saleha Girls' Secondary Arabic Religious School, Kampong Birau
- Sufri Bolkiah Secondary School, Bukit Bendera

== Cameroon ==
- Our Lady of Lourdes College, Bamenda
- Saker Baptist College, Limbe

== Canada ==
=== Alberta ===
- Calgary Girls' School

=== British Columbia ===
- St. Margaret's School, Victoria

Vancouver

- Crofton House School
- Little Flower Academy
- York House School

=== Manitoba ===
Winnipeg

- Balmoral Hall School
- St. Mary's Academy

=== Nova Scotia ===
Former

- Holy Angels High School, Sydney (1885-2011)

=== Ontario ===
- Elmwood School, Ottawa
- Holy Name of Mary Catholic Secondary School, Brampton
- Holy Name of Mary College School, Mississauga
- Marymount Academy, Greater Sudbury
- St. Mildred's-Lightbourn School, Oakville
- St. Anne's School, Aurora
- Trafalgar Castle School, Whitby

Toronto

- Bishop Strachan School
- Branksome Hall
- Havergal College
- Hawthorn School for Girls
- The Linden School
- Loretto Abbey Catholic Secondary School
- Loretto College School
- Madonna Catholic Secondary School
- Mariyah Islamic School
- Notre Dame High School
- St. Joseph's College School
- St. Joseph's Morrow Park Catholic Secondary School
- St. Clement's School

Former

- Alma College, St. Thomas, Ontario (1878-1988)
- St. Joseph Islington High School, merged into Michael Power/St. Joseph High School

=== Quebec ===
- Collège Saint-Joseph de Hull, Gatineau
- Trafalgar School for Girls, Montreal

Westmount

- Miss Edgar's and Miss Cramp's School
- The Study

== Chile ==
Former

- Colegio de la Preciosa Sangre de Pichilemu
- Concepción College (Concepción, Chile)
- Santiago College

== China ==
This list covers Mainland China only. For Hong Kong and Macau see their respective lists. For schools in the Taiwan area, including the island of Taiwan, go to "Taiwan (Republic of China)"

- Beijing EBSNU HuaXia Girls' Middle School, Beijing (北京师范大学实验华夏女子中学)
- Shanghai No. 3 Girls' High School, Shanghai
- Phoenix School for Girls, Gutang
- Zhuhai Xiang Zhang Secondary School, Zhuhai (formerly Zhuhai Girls' Middle School)

Former:

- David Hill Memorial School
- Girls' High School Attached to Beijing Normal University, now Experimental High School Attached to Beijing Normal University
- McTyeire School
- No. 4 Girls' School of Beijing (now Beijing Chen Jing Lun High School)
- St. Mary's Hall, Shanghai
- Shanghai No. 2 Girls' High School (now Shanghai No. 2 High School)
- Virginia School for Girls

== Cyprus ==
Former

- American Academy for Girls (now American Academy Nicosia)

== Denmark ==
Now coeducational

- Ingrid Jespersens Gymnasieskole
- Nørre Gymnasium
- N. Zahle's School

Former

- Døtreskolen af 1791
- J. Cl. Todes Døtreskole
- Madam Lindes Institut

== Egypt ==
- Deutsche Schule der Borromäerinnen Alexandria, Alexandria
- Deutsche Schule der Borromäerinnen Kairo, Cairo
- El Nasr Girls' College, Alexandria
- Institution Sainte Jeanne-Antide, Alexandria
- Manar English Girls School, Alexandria

Former

- School for hakımāt
- Suyufiyya Girls' School

== Finland ==
Former

- Svenska fruntimmersskolan i Helsingfors
- Svenska fruntimmersskolan i Åbo
- Fruntimmersskolan i Viborg (now in Russian territory)

== France ==
Former

- Lycée Fénelon, Paris
- Lycée Racine
- Maison royale de Saint-Louis

== Germany ==
- Erzbischöfliche Liebfrauenschule Bonn, Bonn
- Maria-Wade-Schule, Bad Homburg
- Sankt-Adelheid-Gymnasium, Bonn

Former

- Bismarck-Oberlyzeum
- Goethe-Oberlyzeum
- Hufen-Oberlyzeum
- Königin-Luise-Schule
- Körte-Oberlyzeum
- Landfrauenschule Metgethen
- Lette-Verein
- Ostpreußische Mädchengewerbeschule
- Victoria-Lyzeum

== Ghana ==
Ashanti Region

- Adventist Girls High School
- Kumasi Girls Senior High School
- Serwaa Nyarko Girls' Senior High School
- St. Louis Senior High School (Ghana)
- St. Monica's Senior High School
- T.I. Ahmadiyya Girls Senior High School, Asokore
- Yaa Asantewaa Secondary School

Brong-Afaho Region

- Notre Dame High School (Ghana)
- OLA Girls Senior High School (Kenyasi)

Central Region

- Holy Child High School, Ghana
- Mfantsiman Girls' Secondary School
- Wesley Girls' Senior High School

Eastern Region

- Aburi Girls' Senior High School
- Methodist Girls Senior High School
- Methodist Girls' High School (Mamfe)
- St Roses Senior High (Akwatia)

Greater Accra Region

- Accra Girls Senior High School
- African Science Academy
- St Mary's Senior High School (Ghana)

Northern Region

- Gambaga Girls Senior High School
- Tamale Girls Secondary School

Upper East Region

- Bolgatanga Girls Senior High School

Upper West Region

- St. Francis Girls' Senior High School

Volta Region

- Mawuko Girls Senior High School
- OLA Girls Senior High School (Ho)

Western Region

- Ahantaman Girls Senior High School
- Archbishop Porter Girls Secondary School
- Axim Girls Senior High School

Now coeducational

- Queen of Apostles Boarding School, Elmina

== Gibraltar ==
Now coeducational:

- Westside School, Gibraltar

== Guam ==
- Academy of Our Lady of Guam

Former girls' schools

- Notre Dame High School (Guam) (became coeducational in 1995)

== Guernsey ==
- Ladies' College, Guernsey

== Iran ==
Since the Iranian Revolution government schools have been divided by gender

- Toloo High School
- Tehran Farzanegan School
- Tehran International School has a separate girls' campus

Former

- Refah School

== Iraq ==
Baghdad

- Amil High School for Girls
- Baghdad High School for Girls
- Tigris Secondary School for Girls

Al Mutamayizeen Secondary has girls' schools.

== Ireland (Republic of) ==
Connacht

- Mercy College, Sligo
- Mount St. Michaels, Claremorris
- Ursuline College, Sligo

Leinster

- Alexandra College, Milltown
- Coláiste Íosagáin, Booterstown
- Holy Faith Secondary School, Clontarf
- Loreto Abbey, Dalkey
- Loreto College, Dublin
- Loreto College, Swords
- Loreto High School, Rathfarnham
- Loreto Secondary School, Kilkenny
- Loreto Secondary School, Navan
- Manor House School, Raheny
- Mercy College, Coolock
- Mount Anville Secondary School, Goatstown
- Muckross Park College, Donnybrook
- Our Lady's College, Drogheda
- Presentation Secondary School, Kilkenny
- St. Joseph's Secondary School, Navan
- St. Leo's College, Carlow
- St Louis High School, Rathmines
- St Louis Secondary School, Dundalk
- St Wolstan's Community School, Celbridge

Munster

- Sancta Maria College, Ballyroan
- Ard Scoil na nDéise, Dungarvan
- Laurel Hill Coláiste, Limerick
- Scoil Mhuire, Cork
- St Angela's College, Cork
- St Patricks Girls Primary, Cork

Ulster

- Loreto Convent Secondary School, Letterkenny

Former girls' schools

- Ardscoil Mhuire, Ballinasloe
- The Diocesan School for Girls - merged into The High School, Dublin in 1974
- Collegiate School Celbridge, Celbridge
- St. Augustine's Industrial School for Girls, Templemore

== Israel ==
- Schmidt's Girls College, which is in East Jerusalem, under Israeli control and politically disputed between Israel and Palestine

== Italy ==
- Istituto Statale della Ss. Annunziata

== Jamaica ==
- Hampton School, Malvern
- Holy Childhood High, Kingston
- Immaculate Conception High School, Saint Andrew Parish
- Marymount High School, Highgate
- Montego Bay High School, Montego Bay
- Queen's School, Kingston
- St Andrew High School, Saint Andrew
- St Hugh's High School, Saint Andrew
- Westwood High School, Stewart Town

== Jersey ==
- Beaulieu Convent School
- Jersey College for Girls

== Jordan ==
Former:

- Schmidt's Girls College (formerly in Jordanian East Jerusalem, now in Israeli-controlled East Jerusalem)

== Kenya ==
- Alliance Girls High School, Kikuyu
- Arch-Bishop Okoth Ojolla Girls School, Kisumu
- Archbishop Njenga Girls High School, Lugari
- Bishop Gatimu Ngandu Girls High School, Ngandu
- Butere Girls High School, Butere
- Daraja Academy, Nanyuki
- The Green Garden Girls High School, Kikuyu
- Kenya High School, Kileleshwa
- Kianda School, Westlands
- Loreto High School, Limuru
- Lwak Girls' High School, Rarieda
- Muthale Girls' High School, Mutonguni
- Ng'iya Girls High School, Ng'iya Township
- Ngara Girls' High School, Nairobi
- Ondati Girls Secondary School, Nyanza Province
- Serare School (High School), Nairobi
- Starehe Girls' Centre, Nairobi

== North Korea ==
- Chung Eui Girls' High School

== South Korea ==
Busan

- Dongnae Girls' High School

Daegu

- Daegu Hyehwa Girls' High School
- Youngsong Girls' High School

Incheon

- Incheon Nonhyeon High School (all girls from 2011)
- Myeongsin Girl's High School

Gyeonggi Province

- Youngshin Girls' High School (Suwon)

Jeju Province

- Branksome Hall Asia

Sejong City

- Chochiwon Girls' High School

Seoul

- Bosung Girls' High School
- Chungshin Girls' High School
- Eunkwang Girls' High School
- Ewha Girls' High School
- Ewha Girls' Foreign Language High School
- Jinmyeong Girls' High School
- Jinseon Girls' High School
- Kyunggi Girls' High School
- Sehwa Girls' High School
- Seoul Girls' High School
- Sookmyung Girls' High School
- Youngpa Girls' High School

South Chungcheong Province

- Bugil Girls' High School
- Cheonan Girls' High School

North Chuncheong Province

- Cheongju Jungang Girls' Middle School
- Cheongju Girls' High School

== Libya ==
Former

- Italian Girls' School, Tripoli

== Macau ==
Nossa Senhora de Fátima

- Our Lady of Fatima Girls' School (Escola Nossa Senhora de Fátima; 化地瑪聖母女子學校)

== Madagascar ==
Former

- Antsahamanitra Boarding School for Girls

== Malawi ==
- Edinburgh Girls' High School, Engcongolweni
- Likuni Girls' Secondary School, Lilongwe
- Lilongwe Girls' Secondary School
- Ludzi Girls Secondary School
- Marymount Catholic Secondary School
- St Mary's Secondary School, Zomba

== Malaysia ==
Johor

- Sekolah Tun Fatimah

Kuala Lumpur

- Bukit Bintang Girls' School
- Convent Bukit Nanas
- St. Mary's School, Kuala Lumpur
- Sekolah Menengah Kebangsaan Puteri Wilayah
- SMS Seri Puteri

Negeri Sembilan

- Kolej Tunku Kurshiah

Penang

- Convent Datuk Keramat
- St. George's Girls' School

Perak

- Convent Taiping
- Henry Gurney School, Batu Gajah
- Methodist Girls' School, Ipoh
- SMK Main Convent, Ipoh
- Treacher Methodist Girls' School

Sabah

- Henry Gurney School, Kota Kinabalu

Selangor

- Methodist Girls' School, Klang
- Sekolah Seri Puteri (Cyberjaya)

== Mauritius ==
- Bon Accueil State College, Flacq
- Cosmopolitan College (Girls), Plaines Des Papayes
- Ebène State Secondary School (Girls), Beau Bassin-Rose Hill
- Loreto College of Rose-Hill, Rose Hill
- Madad Ul Islam Girls' College, Port Louis
- Renganaden Seeneevassen SSS, Port Louis
- Windsor College Girls, Rose-Belle

Former

- Queen Elizabeth College, Mauritius

== Mexico ==
- Liceo de Monterrey (girls)

Irish Institute in the State of Mexico has a separate campus for girls.

Universidad Panamericana Preparatoria in Mexico City has a separate campus for girls.

== Myanmar (Burma) ==
- Basic Education High School No. 2 Latha
- Basic Education High School No. 2 Sanchaung
- Basic Education High School No. 3 Dagon, formerly Myoms Girls National High School
- Basic Education High School No. 4 Botataung

Mandalay

- Basic Education High School No. 8 Mandalay

== New Zealand ==
Auckland Region

- Auckland Girls' Grammar School, Newton, Auckland
- Baradene College of the Sacred Heart, Remuera, Auckland
- Carmel College, Milford, Auckland
- Diocesan School for Girls, Auckland, Epsom, Auckland
- Epsom Girls' Grammar School, Epsom, Auckland
- Kelston Girls' College, Kelston, Auckland
- McAuley High School, Ōtāhuhu, Auckland
- Marist College, Mount Albert, Auckland
- St Cuthbert's College, Epsom, Auckland
- Saint Kentigern College, Pakuranga, Auckland — has gender separation in some classes
- St Mary's College, Ponsonby, Auckland
- Westlake Girls High School, Takapuna, Auckland

Bay of Plenty Region

- Rotorua Girls' High School, Rotorua
- Tauranga Girls' College, Tauranga

Canterbury Region

- Avonside Girls' High School, Christchurch
- Christchurch Girls' High School, Riccarton, Christchurch
- Craighead Diocesan School, Highfield, Timaru
- Marian College, Northcote, Christchurch
- Rangi Ruru Girls' School, Merivale, Christchurch
- St Margaret's College, Merivale, Christchurch
- Timaru Girls' High School, Timaru
- Villa Maria College, Christchurch, Upper Riccarton, Christchurch
- Selwyn House School, Merivale, Christchurch

Gisborne District

- Gisborne Girls' High School, Gisborne

Hawke's Bay Region

- Hastings Girls' High School, Hastings
- Hukarere Girls' College, Havelock North
- Iona College, Havelock North
- Napier Girls' High School, Napier
- Sacred Heart College, Napier
- Woodford House, Havelock North

Marlborough District

- Marlborough Girls' College, Blenheim

Manawatū-Whanganui Region

- Nga Tawa Diocesan School, Marton
- Palmerston North Girls' High School, Palmerston North
- Turakina Māori Girls' College, Marton
- Whanganui Girls' College, Whanganui

Nelson City

- Nelson College for Girls, Nelson

Northland Region

- Whangārei Girls' High School, Whangārei

Otago Region

- Columba College, Roslyn, Dunedin (Year 7-13)
- Otago Girls' High School, Dunedin
- Queen's High School, Forbury, Dunedin
- St Hilda's Collegiate School, Maori Hill, Dunedin
- Waitaki Girls' High School, Oamaru

Southland Region

- Southland Girls' High School, Georgetown, Invercargill

Taranaki Region

- New Plymouth Girls' High School, Strandon, New Plymouth
- Sacred Heart Girls' College, Fitzroy, New Plymouth
- Taranaki Diocesan School for Girls, Stratford

Waikato Region

- Hamilton Girls' High School, Hamilton
- Sacred Heart Girls' College, Hamilton
- Waikato Diocesan School, Chartwell, Hamilton

Wellington Region

- Chilton Saint James School, Lower Hutt
- Queen Margaret College, Thorndon, Wellington
- Sacred Heart College, Lower Hutt
- St Catherine's College, Kilbirnie, Wellington
- St Mary's College, Thorndon, Wellington
- St Matthew's Collegiate School, Masterton
- St Oran's College (years 7-13), Boulcott, Lower Hutt
- Samuel Marsden Collegiate School, Karori, Wellington
- Solway College, Masterton
- Wellington East Girls' College, Mount Victoria, Wellington
- Wellington Girls' College, Thorndon, Wellington

Former

- Corran School, Remuera, Auckland
- McKillop College, Shirley, Christchurch
- St Mary's College, Christchurch

== Nigeria ==
Abuja State

- Anglican Girls Grammar School, Abuja
- Regina Pacis College, Abuja

Delta State

- Our Lady's High School, Effurun

Edo State

- Anglican Girls Grammar School, Benin City
- Federal Government Girls College, Benin City
- Presentation National High School, Benin City

Enugu State

- Holy Rosary College, Enugu

Imo State

- Federal Government Girls' College, Owerri

Kwara State

- Federal Government Girls College, Omu-Aran

Lagos State

- Anwar ul-Islam Girls High School, Lagos
- Holy Child College, Ikoyi
- Lagoon Secondary School, Lekki
- Methodist Girls' High School, Yaba
- Queen's College, Yaba
- Vivian Fowler Memorial College for Girls, Ikeja

Niger State

- Federal Government Girls College, Bida

Ogun State

- Baptist Girls College, Abeokuta
- Louisville Girls High School, Ijebu-Itele

Osun State

- Federal Government Girls College, Ipetumodu

Oyo State

- Queen's School, Ibadan
- St Anne's School, Ibadan

Rivers State

- Archdeacon Crowther Memorial Girls' School, Port Harcourt
- Federal Government Girls' College, Abuloma
- Holy Rosary College, Port Harcourt
- Methodist Girls High School, Port Harcourt
- Our Lady of Fatima College, Port Harcourt

Yobe State

- Government Girls Science and Technical College Potiskum, Potiskum

== Pakistan ==
Balochistan

- St. Joseph's Convent School, Quetta

Punjab

- Convent of Jesus and Mary, Lahore
- Convent of Jesus and Mary, Murree
- Esena Foundation High School (Lahore)
- Presentation Convent Girls High School (Rawalpindi)
- Presentation Convent School, Jhelum Girls' Campus (Jhelum)
- Sacred Heart High School for Girls (Lahore)

Sindh

- AES School for Girls (Karachi)
- Convent of Jesus and Mary, Karachi (Girls' only from class 6 onwards)
- Mama Parsi Girls Secondary School
- St Joseph's Convent School, Karachi
- St. Lawrence's Girls School, Karachi
- St Mary's Convent High School, Hyderabad

== Palestine ==
- Schmidt's Girls College is in East Jerusalem which is under Israel control and is claimed by Palestine.
- Al-Najah Secondary School

== Peru ==
- Colegio Villa María (Lima)
- San Silvestre School (Lima)

== Philippines ==
- Immaculate Concepcion Academy
- Assumption Colleges

Metro Manila

- Assumption College San Lorenzo (Makati City)
- Concordia College (Manila)
- Colegio de Santa Rosa - Makati
- Holy Family School of Quezon City
- Immaculate Conception Academy–Greenhills (San Juan)
- Miriam College (Quezon City)
- PAREF Woodrose School (Muntinlupa City)
- Saint Pedro Poveda College (Quezon City)
- St. Scholastica's Academy of Marikina
- St. Scholastica's College, Manila

Rizal

- Assumption Antipolo
- PAREF Rosehill School (Antipolo)

Became coeducational

- Colegio de la Inmaculada Concepcion

Closed

- Real Colegio de Santa Potenciana

== Portugal ==
Former

- Instituto de Odivelas

== Qatar ==
Former

- Cambridge International School for Girls School (now coeducational, as Cambridge International School, Doha)

== Russia ==
Former

- College of Princess Obolenskaya
- Mariinskaya Gymnasium
- Moscow School of the Order of St Catherine
- Novodevichii Institute
- Saint-Petersburg Elizabethan Institute
- Smolny Institute of Noble Maidens
- Vilnius Girls' Gymnasium
- Women's Patriotic Institute

== Sierra Leone ==
- Annie Walsh Memorial School, Freetown
- Ansarul Islamic Girls Secondary School
- Freetown Secondary School for Girls, Freetown
- Harford Secondary School for Girls, Moyamba
- Koidu Girls Secondary School, Koidu
- Methodist Girls' High School, Freetown
- Nelson Mandela High School, Waterloo

== Singapore ==
Secondary girls’ schools

- Cedar Girls' Secondary School
- CHIJ Katong Convent
- CHIJ Saint Joseph's Convent
- CHIJ Saint Nicholas Girls' School
- CHIJ Saint Theresa's Convent
- CHIJ Secondary (Toa Payoh)
- Crescent Girls' School
- Methodist Girls' School, Singapore
- Nanyang Girls' High School
- Paya Lebar Methodist Girls' School (Secondary)
- Raffles Girls' School (Secondary)
- Saint Anthony's Canossian Secondary School
- Singapore Chinese Girls' School
- St. Margaret's Secondary School
- Singapore Chinese Girls' School
- Tanjong Katong Girls' School

== South Africa ==
Eastern Cape

- Clarendon High School for Girls (East London)
- Diocesan School for Girls, Grahamstown

Free State

- Eunice High School (Bloemfontein)
- Rosenhof High School

Gauteng

- Afrikaanse Hoër Meisieskool
- Germiston High School
- Jeppe High School for Girls
- Kingsmead College
- Loreto Convent School, Pretoria
- Parktown High School for Girls
- Pretoria High School for Girls
- Roedean School (South Africa)
- St. Andrew's School for Girls
- St Dominic's Catholic School for Girls, Boksburg
- St. Mary's Diocesan School for Girls, Pretoria
- St Mary's School, Waverley
- St Stithians College has separate schools for girls
- Waverley Girls' High School
- Oprah Winfrey Leadership Academy for Girls (Henley on Klip)

KwaZulu-Natal

- Durban Girls' College
- Durban Girls' High School
- Epworth School
- Kimberley Girls' High School
- Maris Stella School
- Pietermaritzburg Girls' High School
- Pinetown Girls' High School
- Queensburgh Girls' High School
- St. Anne's Diocesan College
- St. John's Diocesan School for Girls (Pietermaritzburg)
- St. Mary's Diocesan School for Girls, Kloof
- Westville Girls' High School
- The Wykeham Collegiate

Western Cape

- Herschel Girls' School
- La Rochelle Girls' High School
- Rhenish Girls' High School
- Rustenburg School for Girls (Cape Town)
- St. Cyprian's School, Cape Town
- Wynberg Girls' High School

== Spain ==
Community of Madrid

- Union-Chrétienne de Saint Chaumond (Unión Cristiana de Saint Chaumond) (Madrid)

Former

- Real Colegio de Doncellas Nobles

== Sweden ==
Former

- Åhlinska skolan
- Askersunds flickskola
- Fruntimmersföreningens flickskola
- Hammarstedtska skolan
- Kjellbergska flickskolan
- Klosterskolan (Uppsala)
- Malmö högre läroverk för flickor
- Marianne Ehrenströms flickskola
- Risbergska skolan
- Royal Seminary
- Rudbeckii flickskola
- Societetsskolan
- Storckenfeldtska skolan
- Tapetskolan vid Karlberg
- Uppsala högre elementarläroverk för flickor
- Wallinska skolan

== Switzerland ==
- Institut Villa Pierrefeu
- Surval Montreux

Former

- Bäuerinnenschule
- Institut Alpin Videmanette

== Taiwan (Republic of China) ==
Hsinchu

- National Hsinchu Girls' Senior High School

Kaohsiung

- Kaohsiung Municipal Kaohsiung Girls' Senior High School

Tainan

- National Tainan Girls' Senior High School
- Sheng Kung Girls' High School

Taipei

- Sacred Heart Girls High School (Taipei)
- Taipei First Girls' High School
- Taipei Municipal Zhongshan Girls High School

== Tanzania ==
- Kilakala Girls High School (Morogoro)
- Weruweru Secondary School

== Thailand ==
Bangkok

- Assumption Convent School (Thailand)
- Assumption Suksa School
- Mahaprutharam Girls' School
- Mater Dei School (Thailand)
- Satri Si Suriyothai School
- Wattana Wittaya Academy

Nakhon Ratchasima Province

- Suranaree School (Nakhon Ratchasima)

Previously girls' schools:

- Sacred Heart Convent School (Thailand)

== Turkey ==
- Izmir Girls' High School

Became coeducational

- American Collegiate Institute (Izmir, formerly Smyrna)
- American Academy for Girls (now Üsküdar American Academy) (Istanbul, formerly Constantinople)

Closed

- Istanbul Girls High School
- Zappeion (Constantinople, now Istanbul) - Established in 1875, it was a school for girls catering to the Greek population. Ayşe Sıdıka Hanım, an ethnic Turk, attended this school. Johann Strauss, author of "Language and power in the late Ottoman Empire," described it as "prestigious".

== Uganda ==
- Bweranyangi Girls' Senior Secondary School, Bushenyi
- Gayaza High School, Gayaza
- Kyebambe Girls' Secondary School, Fort Portal
- Maryhill High School, Mbarara
- Mount Saint Mary's College Namagunga, Namagunga
- Nabisunsa Girls' Secondary School, Banda
- Tororo Girls School, Tororo
- Trinity College Nabbingo, Nabbingo
- Wanyange Girls School, Nyange

== United Arab Emirates ==
Abu Dhabi

- Umm Habiba Girls School

Dubai

- Latifa School for Girls

== Vietnam ==
Formerly all girls

- Marie Curie High School (Ho Chi Minh City)

== Zambia ==
- Banani International Secondary School
- Ndola Girls Technical High School
- Munali Girls School

== Zimbabwe ==
Harare

- Arundel School
- Bishopslea Preparatory School
- Chisipite Senior School
- Dominican Convent High School, Harare
- Girls High School, Harare

Bulawayo

- Dominican Convent Primary School, Bulawayo
- Dominican Convent High School, Bulawayo
- Girls' College

Other

- Monte Cassino Girls High School
- Peterhouse Girls' School
- St Dominic's Chishawasha

== By former countries ==
=== Ottoman Empire ===
- Aidin Vilayet
  - American Collegiate Institute (Smyrna, now Izmir)
- Constantinople Vilayet
  - American Academy for Girls (now Üsküdar American Academy) (Constantinople, now Istanbul)
  - Zappeion (Constantinople, now Istanbul) - Established in 1875, it was a school for girls catering to the Greek population. Ayşe Sıdıka Hanım, an ethnic Turk, attended this school. Johann Strauss, author of "Language and power in the late Ottoman Empire," described it as "prestigious".
- Mutasarrifate of Jerusalem
  - Schmidt's Girls College (now in East Jerusalem, under Israeli administration)

== See also ==
- Lists of boys' schools
- High School Girls (Japanese comic series)
