= Union chrétienne de Saint-Chaumond =

Union chrétienne de Saint-Chaumond may refer to:

- Union chrétienne de Saint-Chaumond (Poitiers) in Poitiers, France
- Union chrétienne de Saint-Chaumond (Spain) in Madrid, Spain
