= Lee Tai-young =

South Korean lawyer and judge (1914–1998)

- 이태영
- (undated)
- Born: 10 August 1914; Pukjin, Unsan County, Korea, Empire of Japan
- Died: 16 December 1998 (aged 84)
- Spouse: Chyung Yil-hyung
- Children: 4
- Parent: Kim Heung-won (mother)

Korean name
- Hangul: 이태영
- Hanja: 李兌榮
- RR: I Taeyeong
- MR: I T'aeyŏng

Lee Tai-young (Korean: 이태영; 10 August 1914 – 16 December 1998), also spelled Yi T'ai Yŏng, was Korea's first female lawyer. (Note: Other sources refer to her as the first female lawyer in South Korea.) She was also the founder of the country's first legal aide centre. She fought for women's rights all through her career. Her often mentioned refrain was, "No society can or will prosper without the cooperation of women." Her dedication to law also got her the epithet "the woman judge."

Certain resources have misidentified Lee as the first female judge in Korea's history. The first Korean woman to become a judge was Hwang Yun-suk in 1954. While Lee had sought a judicial appointment around 1954, she was denied a judgeship due to political reasons. She eventually became a judge later in her legal career.

== Early life ==
Lee Tai-young was born on 10 August 1914 in Pukjin, Unsan County, Korea, Empire of Japan (now in North Korea). She was a third-generation Methodist. Her father was a gold miner; her mother was named Kim Heung-Won. Most girl's parents taught girls how to work, but her parents thought that girls need to study, so she went to school with other boys. Her maternal grandfather founded the Methodist Church in Lee's hometown. After completing school in Pukjin, she studied at Chung Eui Girls' High School in Pyongyang. She attended Ewha Womans University, graduating with a bachelor's degree in home economics before marrying the Methodist minister, Yil Hyung Chyung (who had studied in America), in 1936. He was suspected of being a spy for the United States in the 1940s and was imprisoned as "anti-Japanese". He later became the Minister of Foreign Affairs of South Korea. Tai-young lived in a patriarchal society (as was the tradition in Korea) and she had four children, three daughters and a son.

== Career ==
Initially, when she came to Seoul to study at Ewha Womans University, her wish was to become a lawyer. However, her husband was imprisoned for sedition in the 1940s by the Japanese colonial government. Lee then had to work as a school teacher and radio singer, and took in sewing and washing in the early 1940s to maintain her family. After World War II, encouraged by her husband, she continued her studies. In 1946, she became the first woman to enter Seoul National University, earning her law degree three years later. In 1957, after the Korean War she opened a law practice, Women's Legal Counseling Center, which provided services to poor women. In 1952, she was the first woman to pass the National Judicial Examination.

Lee and her husband participated in the 1976 Myongdong Declaration, which called for the return of civil liberties to South Korean citizens. Considered an enemy of President Park Chung Hee because of her political views, she was arrested, receiving in 1977 a three-year suspended sentence, a loss of civil liberties, and an automatic disbarment for ten years. Her law practice became the Korea Legal Aid Center for Family Relations, serving more than 10,000 clients each year.

There are two English-language biographies of Lee, David Finkelstein's Korea's 'Quiet' Revolutionary: A Profile of Lee Tai-young (1979) and Sonia Reid Strawn's Where There is No Path: Lee Tai-Young, Her Story (1988).

== Publications ==
She wrote 15 books on issues concerning women and her first book published in 1957 was titled Divorce System in Korea. In 1972, she published Commonsense in Law for Women. Her other notable books are The Woman of North Korea and Born a Woman. She translated Eleanor Roosevelt's book On My Own into the Korean language. She published her memoirs in 1984 under the title Dipping the Han River out with a Gourd.

== Awards ==
In 1975, she was awarded the Ramon Magsaysay Award (also known as the Asian Peace Prize) for Community Leadership by the Ramon Magsaysay Award Foundation with the citation " for effective service to the cause of equal judicial rights for liberation of Korean Women." Three years later, she received the international legal aid award of the International Legal Aid Association. Some of the other awards that she received were the World Methodist Peace Award in 1984, and in 1981 the Honorary Doctorate in Law from the Drew University in Madison, NJ. In 1971 she won the conference award when she participated in the World Peace Though Law Conference held in Belgrade. In 1992, she won the Samil Prize.

== See also ==
- First women lawyers around the world
