= Jinmyeong Girls' High School =

Private girls high school located in Yangcheon-gu, Seoul, South Korea

- Korean: 진명여자고등학교

Information
- Funding type: Private school
- Established: 1906; 120 years ago
- Gender: Girls

Jinmyeong Girls' High School (Korean: 진명여자고등학교; Hanja: 進明女子高等學校) is a private girls high school located in Yangcheon-gu, Seoul, South Korea.

The school was originally established in 1906 with financial support from princess Consort Eom (Princess Sunheon) as part of king Gojong's national salvation movement through educational movement. It was called an "imperial school" for this reason. Jinmyeong's purpose was to provide modern, westernized education for girls.

Jinmyeong Girls' High School Second Symbol Badge, called baekseon (白線, meaning "white line")

In 1910, the Japanese army took over the school during the Japanese occupation of Korea. In 1919 a group of girls, some of whom were students at Jinmyeong started an independence movement against the Japanese occupiers.

The school received criticism in 2022 for forcing students to write letters to soldiers, who sexualized the students.

== Notable alumni ==
- Noh Cheonmyeong, poet attended in the 1920s
- Hwang Yun-suk, South Korea's first female judge
- Eunha, lead vocalist of K-pop girl group, GFriend
- Son Ho-yun, poet

== Notable faculty ==
- Na Hye-sok feminist, poet, writer, painter, educator, and journalist graduated from the school in 2013 and later taught at the school.

== See also ==
- Education in South Korea
