= Tawhida Abdel-Rahman =

Egyptian medical doctor (1906–1974)

- توحيدة عبد الرحمن محمد مصطفى
- Born: 30 November 1906; Minya, Khedivate of Egypt
- Died: 10 September 1974 (aged 67); Heliopolis, Cairo, Egypt
- Education: Suyufiyya Girls' School
- Relatives: Mufidah Abdul Rahman (sister)

Tawhida Abdel-Rahman (30 November 1906 – 10 September 1974) was an Egyptian medical doctor, who became the first female doctor employed by the Egyptian Government Health Ministry.

== Biography ==
Abdel-Rahman was born to a wealthy family on 30 November 1906 in Minya, Khedivate of Egypt. Her father was Abdel Rahman efendi Muhammad, a calligrapher and owner of a printing house. Her younger asister was Mufidah Abdul Rahman, one of Egypt's first female lawyers.

Abdel-Rahman was educated at Suyufiyya Girls' School. In 1922, Abdel-Rahman was among the six winners of a scholarship competition to be permitted to study medicine in the United Kingdom. After returning from England to Egypt in 1933, Abdel-Rahman was appointed to the Kitchener Charitable Hospital in Shubra, Cairo. making her the first female doctor employed by the Egyptian Government Health Ministry.

Abdel-Rahman married Mahmoud Mohamed Abdel-Latif and they had seven children together. She died in 1974 in Heliopolis, Cairo.
