= Johanne Borchgrevink =

Norwegian missionary and educator

Johanne Christiane Borchgrevink (1836–1924) was a Norwegian missionary and educator. In 1872 she founded Antsahamanitra Boarding School for Girls in Antananarivo, Madagascar.
