= Carolina Nunes Vais =

Italian-Jewish educator in Libya

- Born: 1857; Livorno, Italy
- Died: 1932 (aged 74–75); Tripoli
- Occupation: School Director
- Employer(s): Italian Girls' School, Tripoli

Carolina Nunes Vais (1856 – 1932) was an Italian, Jewish educator, who was Director of the Italian Girls' School in Tripoli, which was the first educational establishment for young women in Libya.

== Biography ==
Vais was born in 1856 in Livorno. Little is known about her early life, however in 1877, the Jewish community in Tripoli invited an additional teacher from Livorno to emigrate in order to run a school for girls there. The previous year, in 1876, the first teacher, Giannetto Paggi, had emigrated and it was he who founded the Italian Boys' School there.

During her fifty-five career as Director of the Italian Girls' School, Vais oversaw a number of changes to the curriculum in the school. From 1895 the curriculum included French, soon after English, History and Geography were adopted. In 1903 there were 241 girls enrolled at the school, mostly from Tripoli's Jewish middle class. In 1911 the school's budge was 12,500 francs - 12.5% of the annual budget for all of Libya's education system; the school had 348 pupils.

In addition to her work as Director of the school, Vais was a board member of the Women's Benevolent Society, 'Ezrat Nashim, which was founded in 1895 by a group of Italian women in order to enable medical care for people affected by an outbreak of plague.

Vais died in 1932, whilst still Director of the Italian Girls' School.
