= Mufidah Abdul Rahman =

First female Egyptian lawyer

Mufidah AbdulRahman
- مفيدة عبد الرحمن
- Born: January 20, 1914; Cairo, Khedivate of Egypt
- Died: September 3, 2002 (aged 88)
- Occupation: lawyer
- Known for: first female Egyptian lawyer
- Relatives: Tawhida Abdel-Rahman (sister)

Mufidah Abdul Rahman (Arabic: مفيدة عبد الرحمن; 20 January 1914 – 3 September 2002) was one of Egypt's first female lawyers; she was also the first female lawyer to take cases to the Court of Cassation in Egypt, the first woman to practice law in Cairo, Egypt, the first woman to plead a case before a military court in Egypt, and the first woman to plead cases before courts in the south of Egypt.

== Education ==
When she entered Cairo University, then called King Fouad I University, to study law in 1935, she was the first married woman to enroll there, and she later became the first mother to graduate from there.

== Work ==
She was chosen to defend Doria Shafik in court. This was in regards to how in February 1951, Shafik managed to secretly bring together 1500 women from Egypt's two leading feminist groupings (Bint Al-Nil and the Egyptian Feminist Union), and organize a march of people that interrupted parliament for four hours after they gathered there with a series of demands mainly related to women's Socioeconomics rights. When the case went to trial, many Bint al-Nil supporters attended the courtroom, and the judge adjourned the hearing indefinitely.

Also in the 1950s, she served as a defense lawyer in famous political trials regarding a group charged with conspiring against the state.

In 1959, she became a member of parliament for Ghouriya and Ezbekiya (districts of Cairo). She was an active deputy for seventeen years in a row.

She was the sole woman to be part of the work of the Committee for the Modification of Status Laws for Muslims that began in the 1960s.

She was a board member for Al-Gomhouriya Bank, the Bar Association, the Council of University Unions, the National Conference of the Socialist Union, the National Union, and the Postal Authority Council. She also cofounded the Women of Islam Society, and served as its chairwoman for several years.

== Personal life ==
She was a mother to nine children, Adel, Ismail, Nabila, Azima, Nabil, Sherif, Farouk, Fouad and Samy Abdel Latif. Four of them were born during her study in the university.

== Tribute ==
On January 20, 2020, Google celebrated her 106th birthday with a Google Doodle.

== See also ==
- List of first women lawyers and judges in Africa
