= Son Ho-yun =

Korean poet (1923–2003)

Son Ho-yun (Korean: 손호연, Japanese: 孫戶姸, 1923–2003) was the only Korean poet who wrote Japanese waka poetry. She received the Order of Cultural Merit from the Republic of Korea in 2000 and a commendation from the Japanese Minister of Foreign Affairs in 2002 for her contributions to mutual understanding between Korea and Japan.

== Education ==
Son graduated from Jinmyeong Girls’ High School in Seoul in 1940, then studied abroad at Tokyo Imperial Women’s University in 1943 with the scholarship of Yi Bang-Ja, the princess consort of the last Crown Prince of Korea and a member of the Japanese Imperial Family.

She later studied under Sasaki Nobutsuna and Nakanishi Susumu, who are leaders in the field of waka poetry. 1979, she entered the Department of Classical Studies at Showa Women's University, and in 1980, she studied Japanese classical literature at the graduate school of Seijo University.

== Career ==
Son wrote over 2000 waka poems in 60 years and was recognized as a master of tanka in Japan. Susumu Nakanishi praised her poetry as “a song that contains Korean emotions that the Japanese cannot imitate and transcends national borders.”

In 1944, she published her first tanka collection, Hoyunga Collection. In 1958, she published her second tanka collection, The First Mugunghwa. In 1968, she published her third tanka collection, The Second Mugunghwa. In 1980, she published her fourth tanka collection, The Third Mugunghwa, and in 1990, she published her fifth tanka collection, The Fourth Mugunghwa. Eight years later, in 1998, she published her sixth tanka collection, The Fifth Mugunghwa.

== Honors and Legacy ==
In 1997, a monument to Son Ho-Yun was erected in Rokkasho-mura, Aomori Prefecture, and monuments to her poems were erected in six places across the Aomori Prefecture.

In 1998, Son Ho-Yun became the first Korean invited to speak at the Utakai Hajime or New Year's Address hosted by Emperor Akihito.

At the 2005 Korea-Japan Summit, Prime Minister Junichiro Koizumi quoted Son’s tanka to Korean President Roh Moo-hyun, saying, “I have one earnest wish: for a country without conflict.”
