= Cheonan Girls' High School =

- Korean: 천안여자고등학교

Location
- 102-1, Samyeong-dong, Dongnam-gu; Cheonan, Chungcheongnam-do, 330-150; South Korea
- Coordinates: 36.778772°N 127.168384°E

Information
- Type: Public School
- Motto: True, Kind, Beautiful
- Founded: 1952
- Principal: Mrs. Lee Young I
- Staff: 78 (teaching staff)
- Gender: Girls
- Age: 15 to 18
- Enrollment: 1500
- Colours: Royal blue, sky blue, white
- No. of Graduates: 20,421
- Website: http://www.cag.hs.kr/

천안여자고등학교 (Cheonan Girls’ High School), often referred to simply as Cheonan Yeogo in Korean, is a South Korean Public School for girls aged 15 to 18. It was founded in 1952.

It is located in the city of Cheonan, in the province of Chungcheongnam-do, South Korea, and is about 1 hour South of Seoul.

== History ==
1952 – The school was founded by the Chungnam Board of Education
1974 – The school moved from its original location in Weonsong-dong to its new location in Samyeong-dong. At its old site, it had been both a middle and a high school, however it was decided the school should split, and the two should expand separately, with the high school finding a new location.
2002 – The School dormitory was built, designed to house approx. 200 students. The Dorm was named JinHyang meaning “True Scent”.
2008 – The school was renovated with the addition of several new buildings.
2010 – Chungnam Board of Education awarded the school the title of Myeongmungo Godunghakyo, meaning Prestige School.

== Location ==
The school is located in the city of Cheonan in the province of Chungcheongnam-do, often called Chungnam-do for short. Cheonan is about 1 hour south of Seoul by train, but can be accessed faster by the KTX passing through Cheonan-Asan Station. There is also a subway line (Seoul Subway Line 1) running from Seoul to Cheonan that takes about 2 1/2 hours. The school was originally located in Wonseong-dong until 1974 when it moved to Samryeong-dong, under Mount Mamang and next to Samgeori Park on the outskirts of the city. The location is at the foot of the mountain surrounded by farms, making the school a very fresh and natural environment for the students. The walk up the hill to the school is a notable feature for the students, who either remember the walk fondly, or otherwise.

== Leadership and structure ==
There are 70 full-time teaching staff at the school, approx. 8 additional teaching staff (including a Native English Teacher) and 10 support and administrative staff. The school also has a nurse and special needs team.

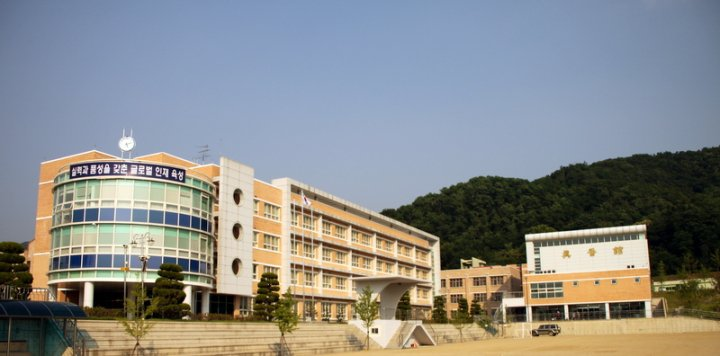
View from the school entrance

Principal – Mrs. Lee Young Ii (English)
Vice Principal – Mr. Ahn Yong Hwan (Biology)
Head of 3rd Grade – Mr. Shin Oek Cheol (Mathematics)
Head of 2nd Grade – Jeon Pil Che (Biology)
Head of 1st Grade – Mr. Im Jae Bong (Biology)

== Prestige School Status ==
Due to the ongoing success of the school, the Chungnam Board of Education deemed the school a model for others, and as such awarded it with the title Myeongmungo Godunghakyo, literally translated as Prestige High School.

== Admissions process ==
Students enter CGHS at 15 or 16 years old. Students first apply for their High School of choice, after which all students sit a province-wide test in December. Depending on their results, the top 500 students wishing to attend the school are allowed entrance. Students then sit an exam conducted by the school to establish their ability in English and Mathematics.

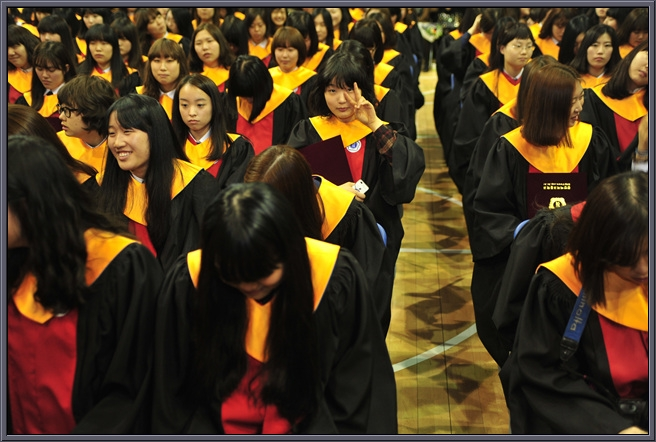
Students Graduating in their academicals

== Sports ==
Sports Day takes place on May 26 where students partake in traditional events such as running, jump rope, tug of war and hula hoop.

=== Gymnastics ===
Several students excel in gymnastics and attend national and international competitions including most recently, the Asian Games.

=== Shooting ===
The school has a dedicated Shooting Club and Team with a full-time coach and private firing range. They won 2nd prize in the national “Michuholgi” Tournament in 2010.

== Sports Day Gallery ==
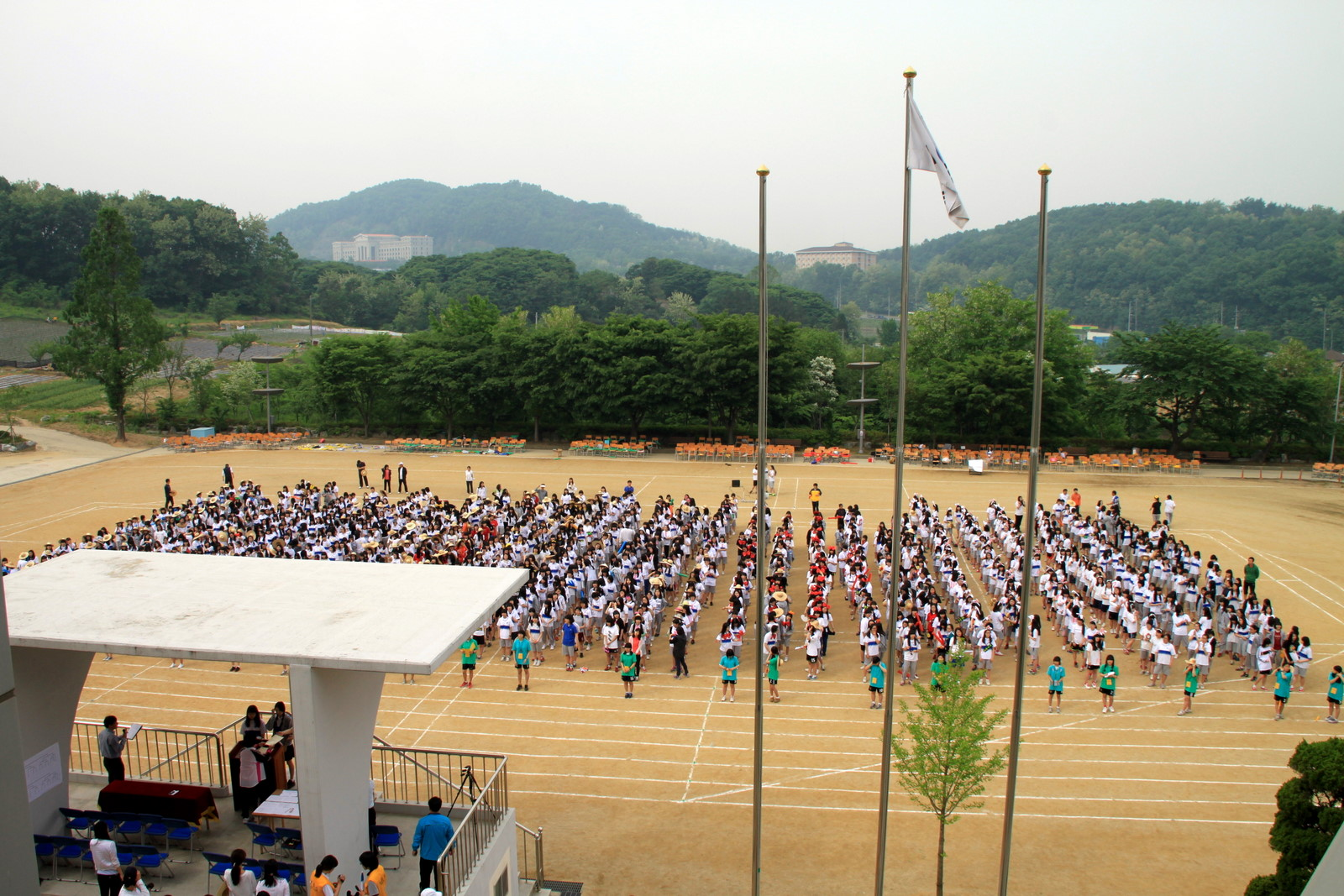
Sports Day Opening Ceremony

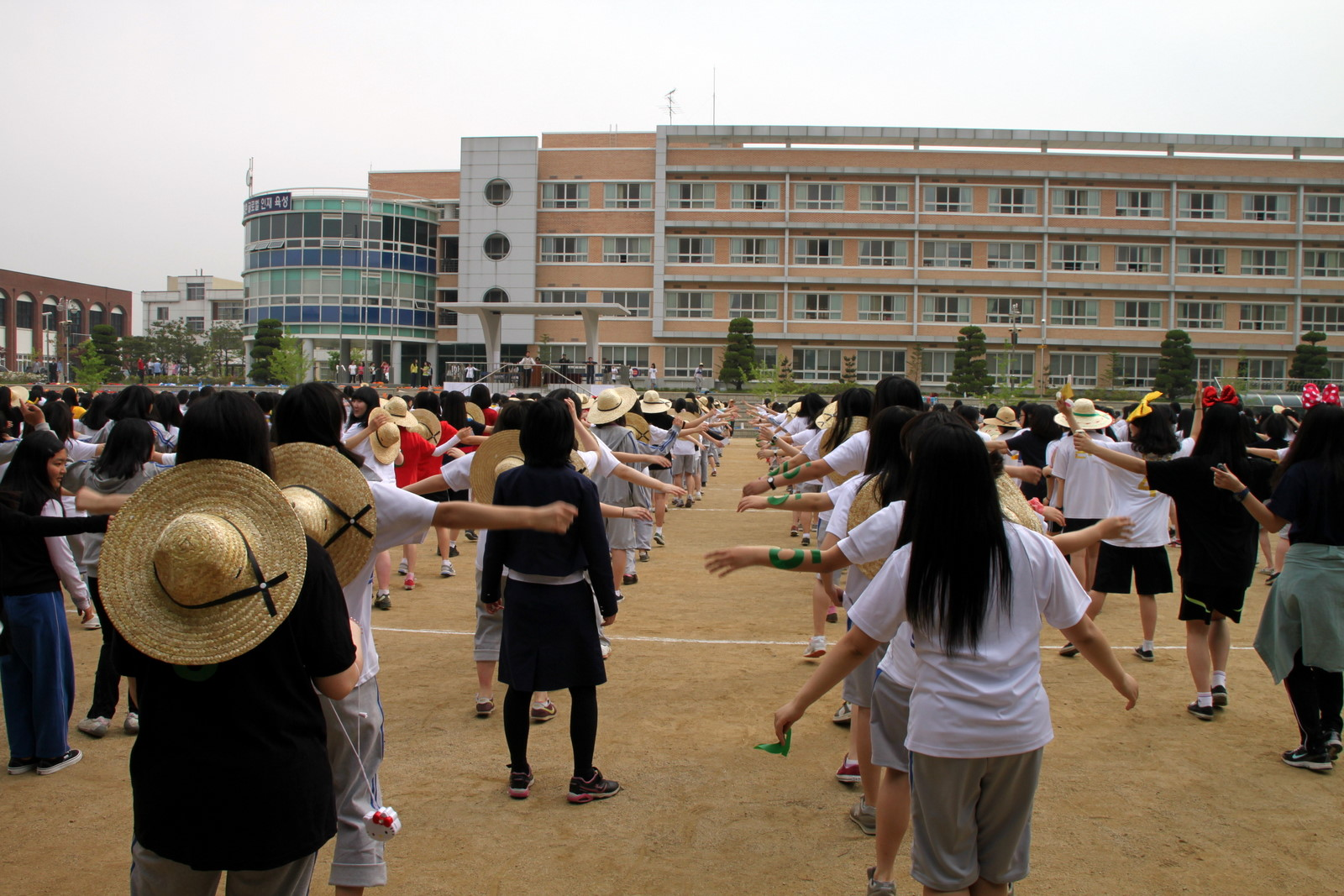
Students warming up together before the events begin

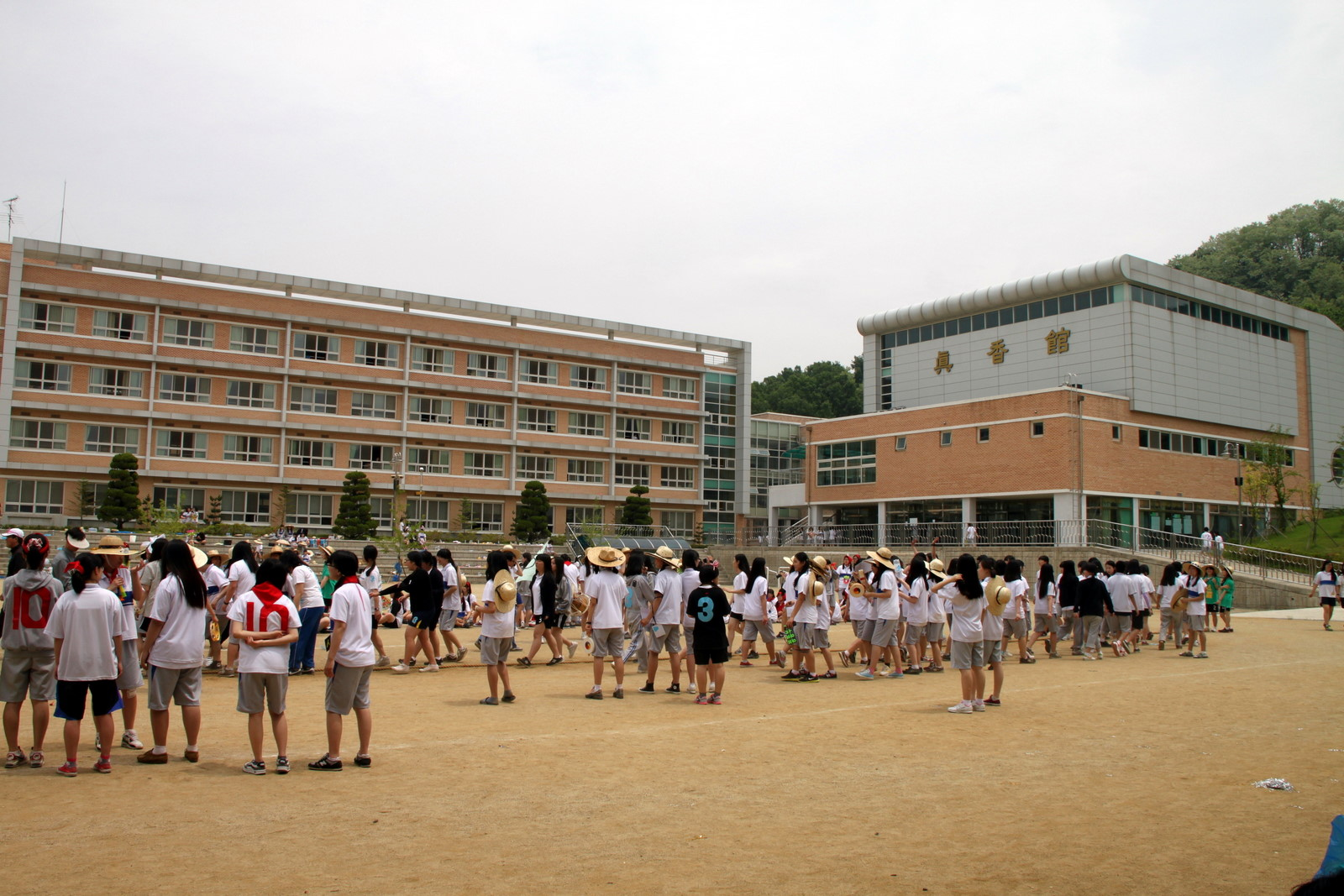
The school behind the sports field

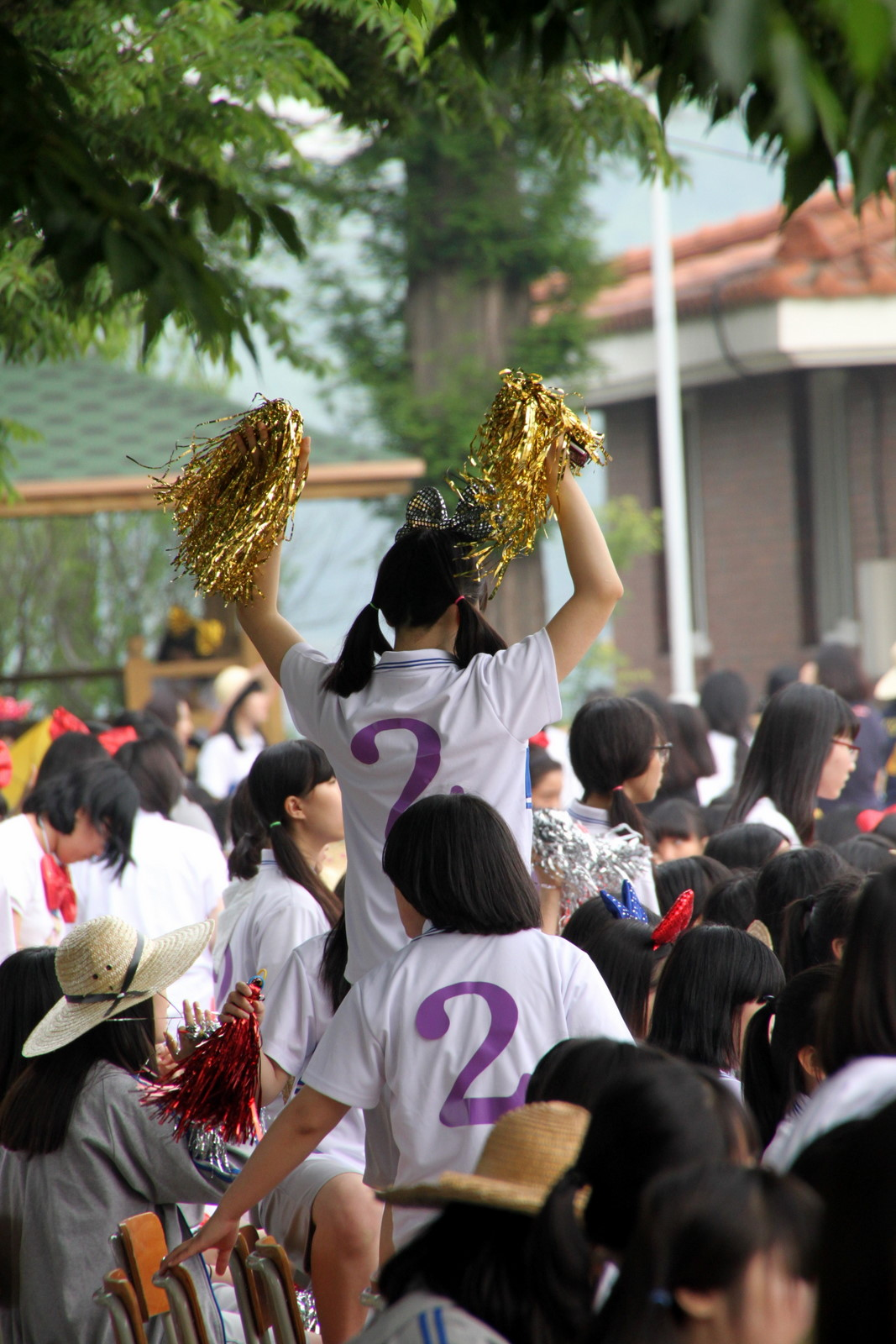
Students cheer their teams by various means

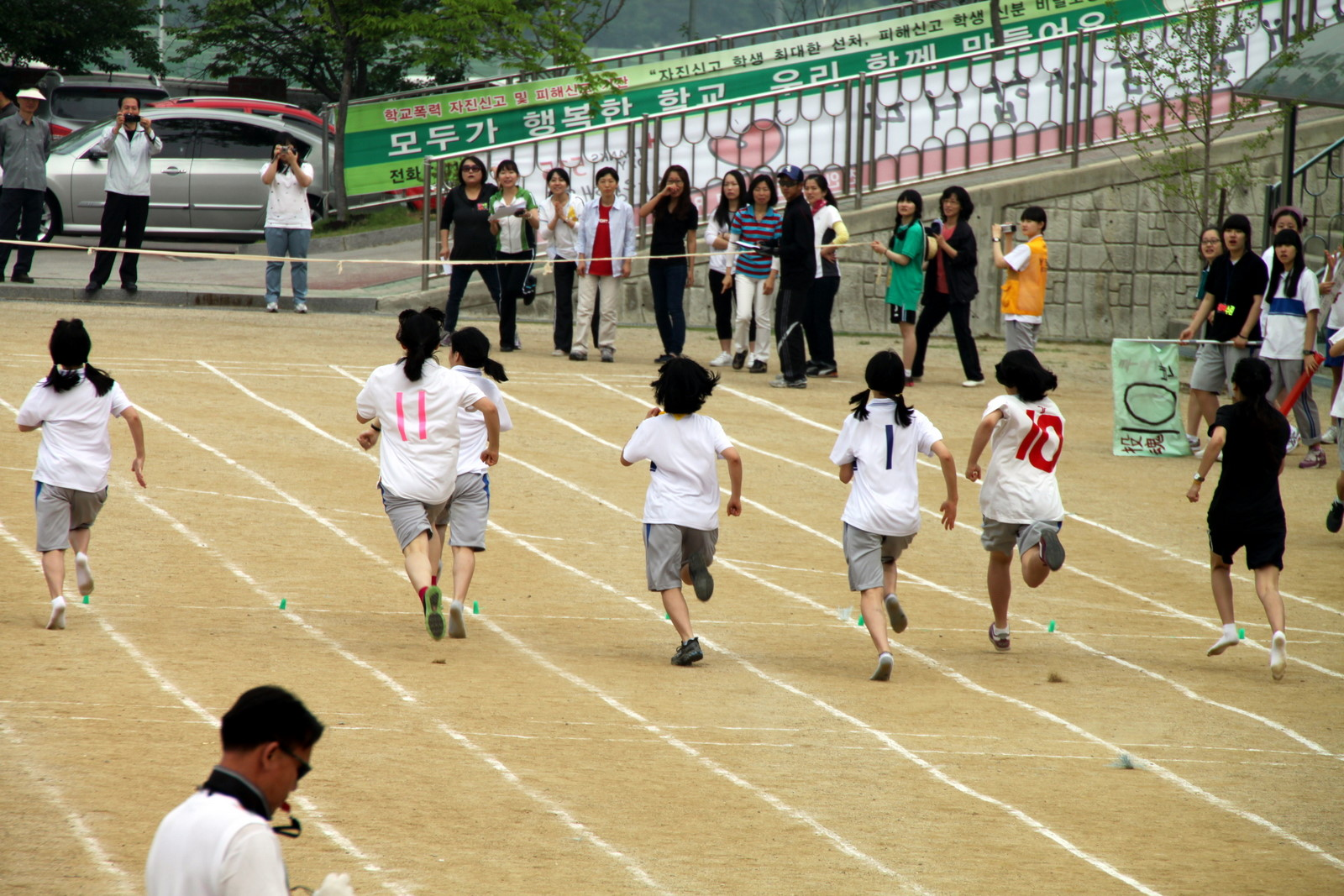
Running race

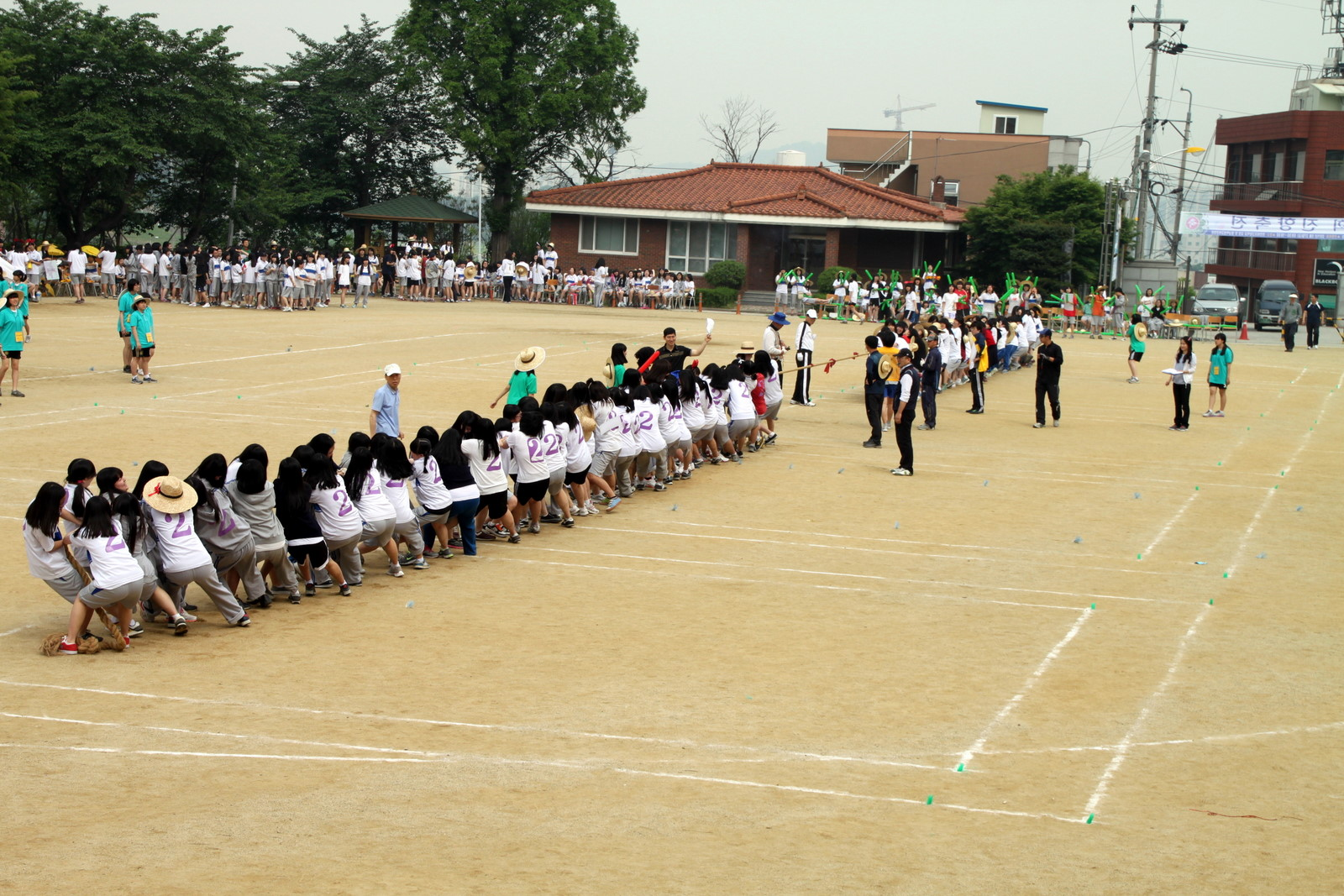
Tug of War

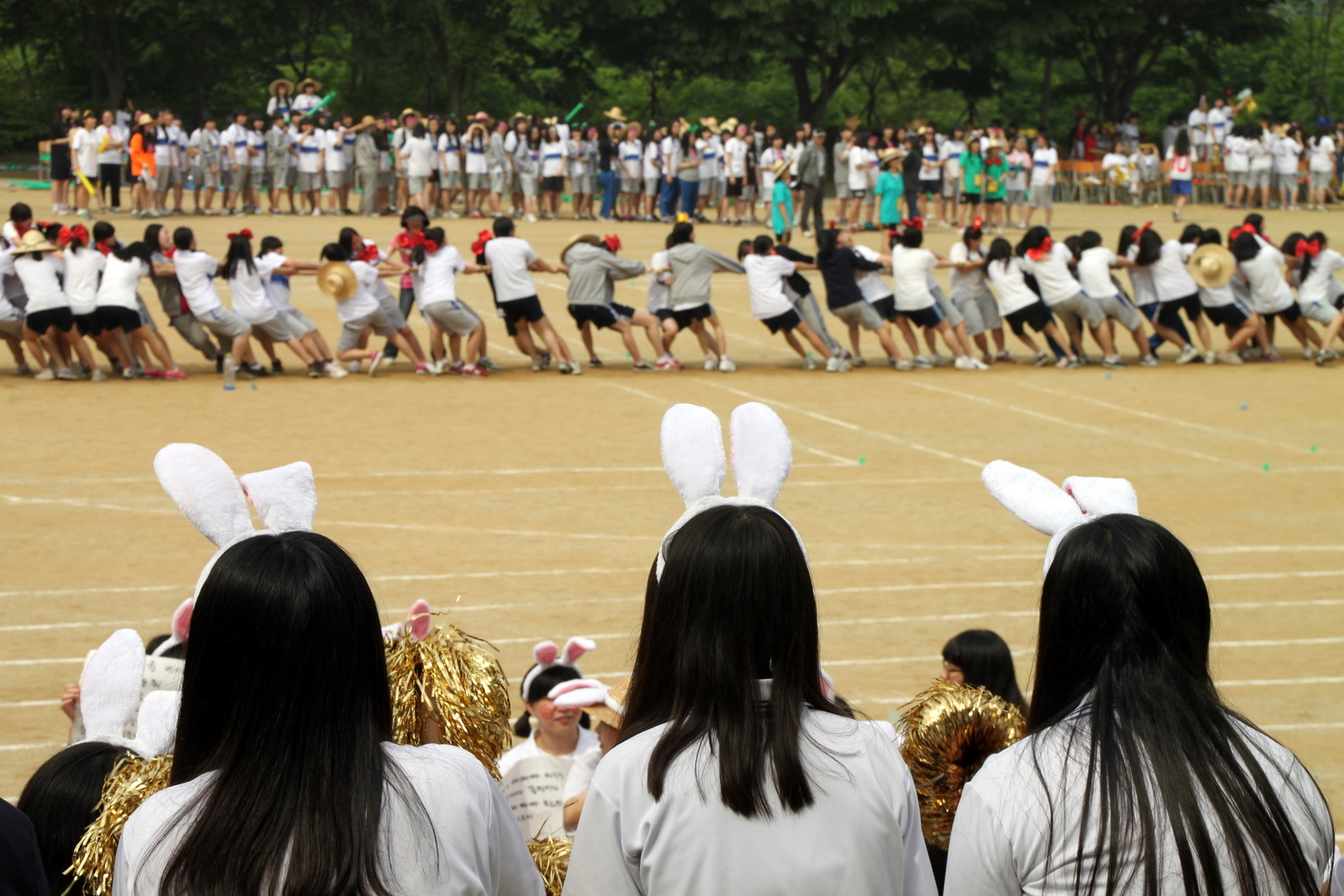
Students support their teams as they battle it out

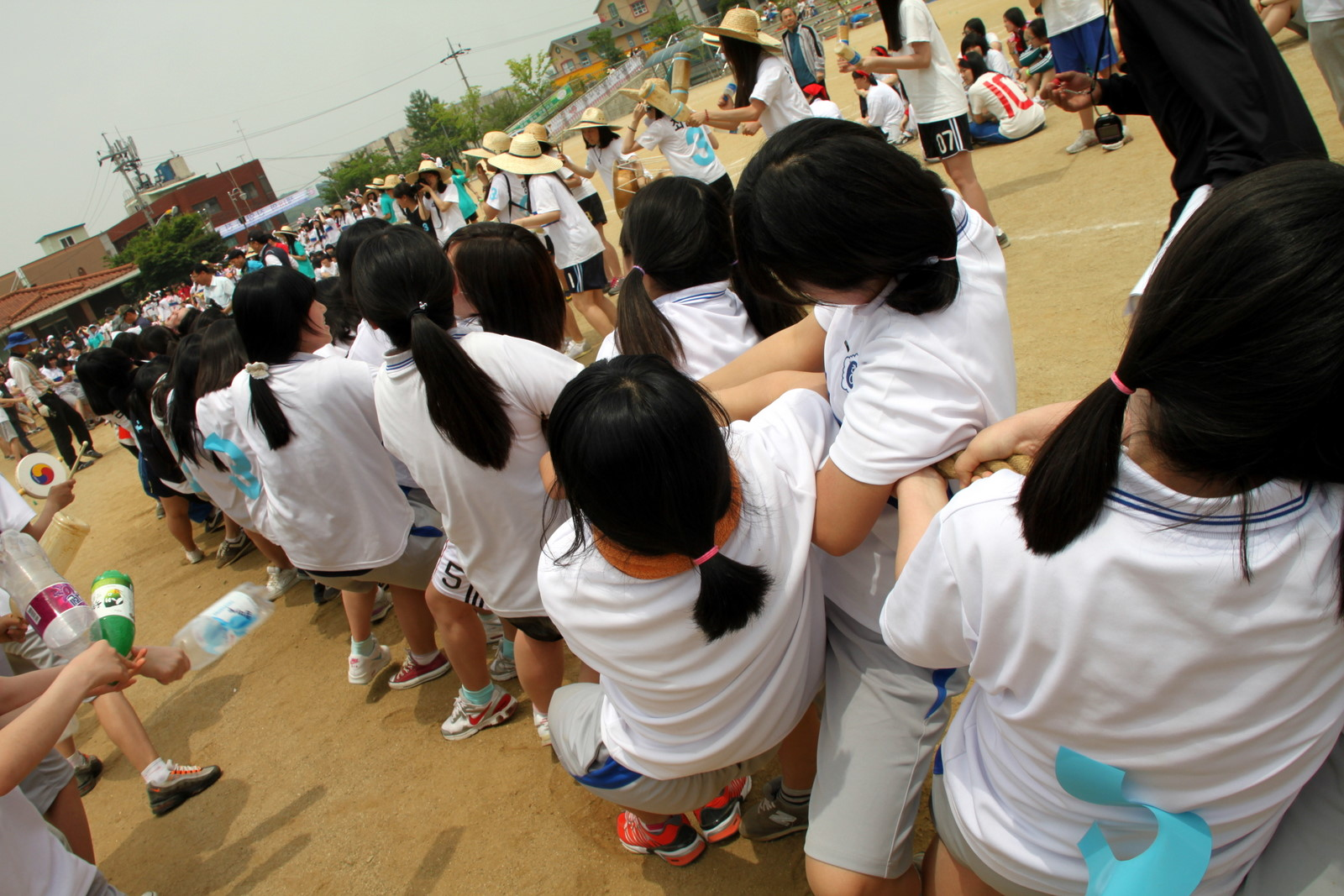
Students fighting hard to win

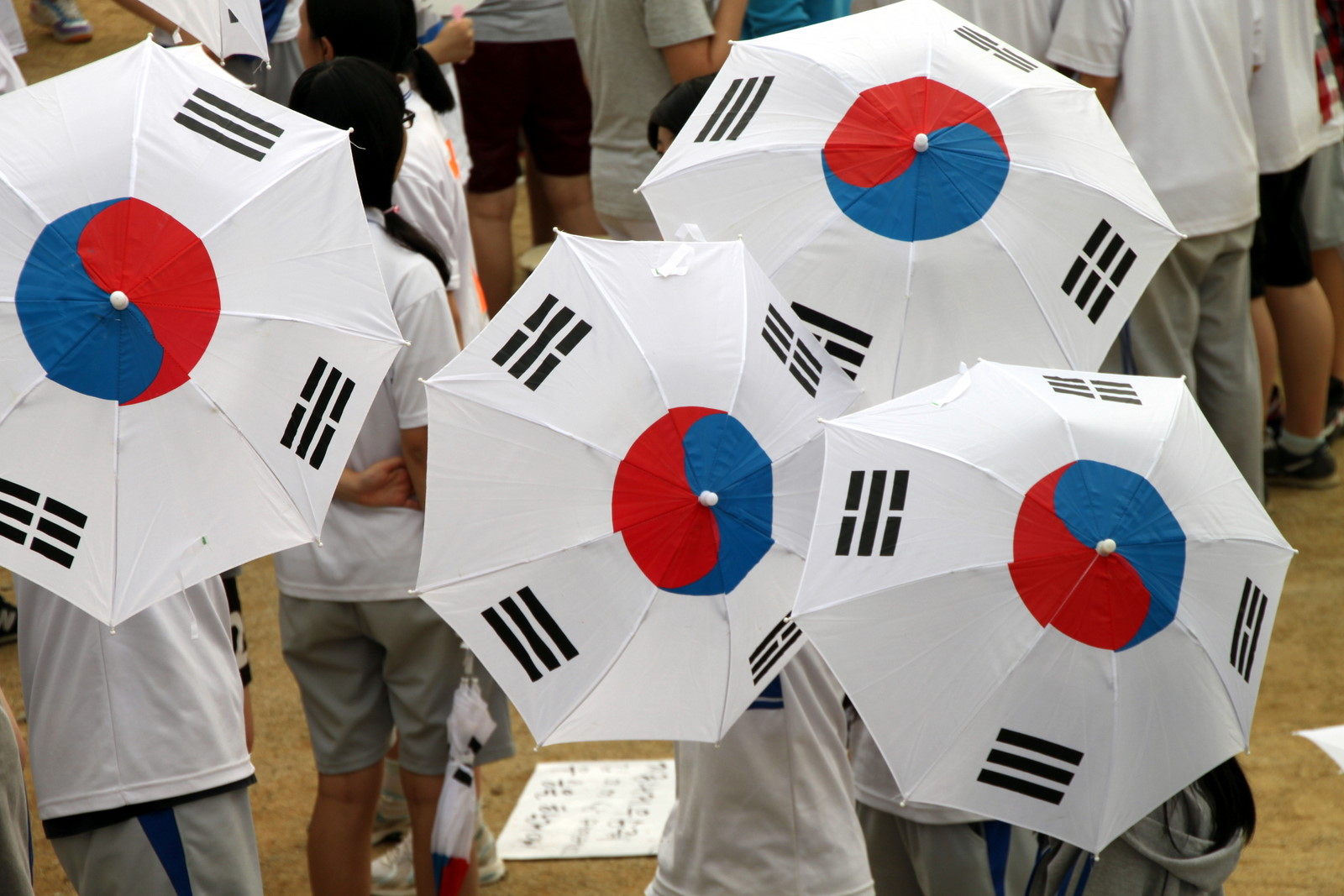
Students buy various items to affiliate themselves with their teams.

== School clubs and publications ==
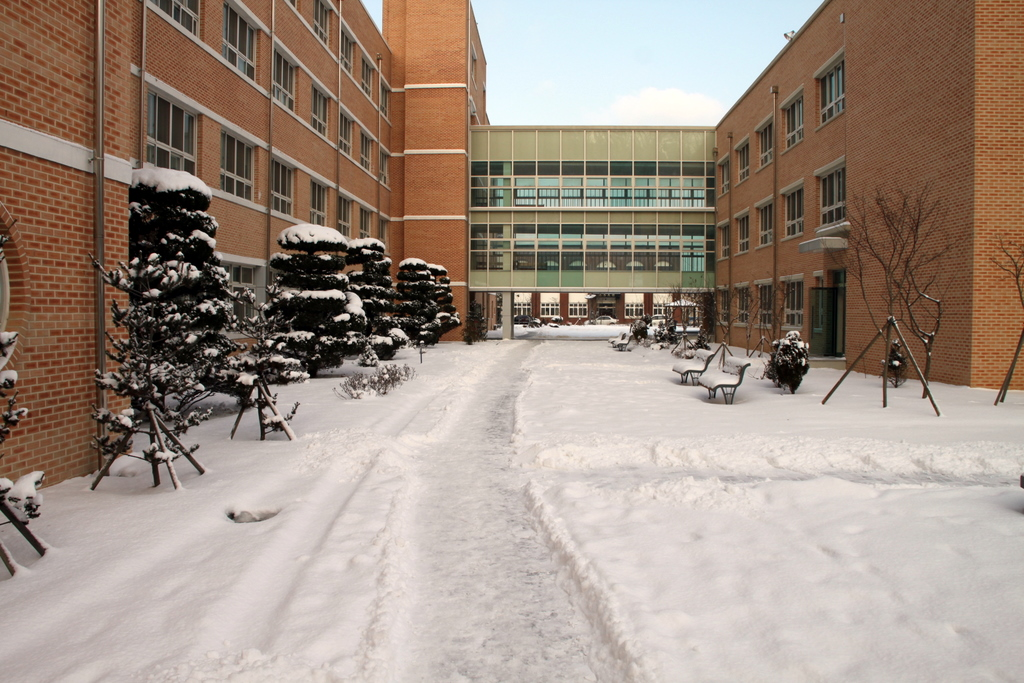
CGHS in Winter

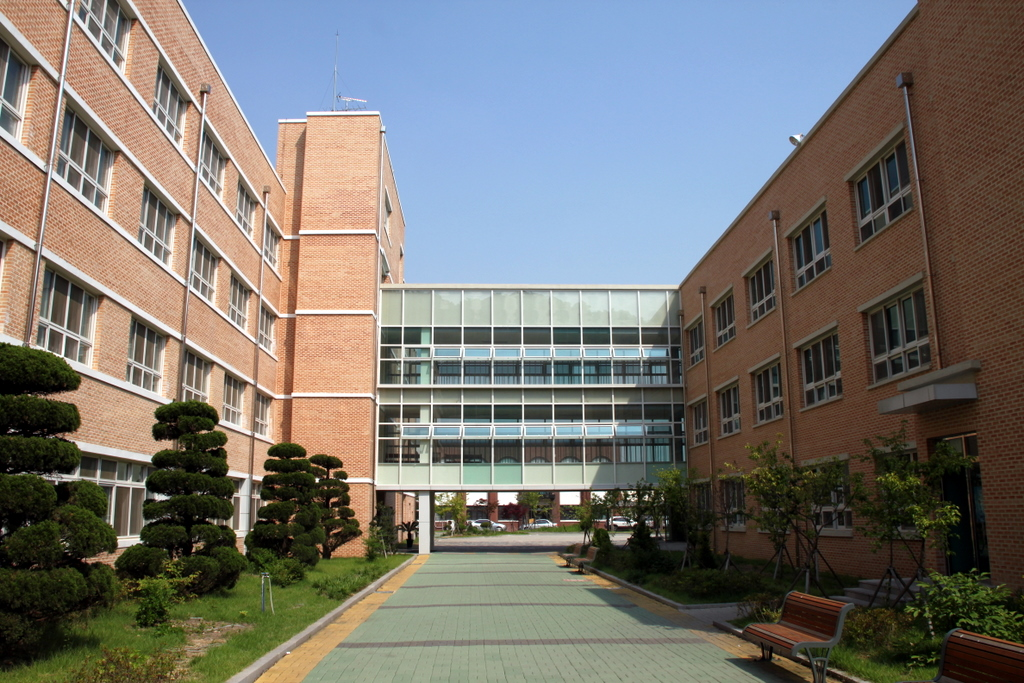
CGHS in Summer

Art Club – A club to further the talents of students looking to become artists.
Cheonyo Karak – This is a traditional Korean music club, playing genres such as Samul-nori. The club frequently wins prizes and practice daily in their own music room. The club also serves as an opportunity to allow students to hear traditional Korean music performed at events such as the school festival.
Webi Club – Singing and Dancing Club
FEEL – School guitar club
DOLCE – Music Club for the Violin, Viola, Cello and Double Base.
Study Clubs – Extra curricular clubs for Maths, Business, Chinese and Earth Sciences.

== Notable alumni ==
- Park Ji Yeon – Korean Gymnast who most recently attended the 16th Asian Games. Still a student at CGHS
- Kim Hyeon Oh – Professor at Changan University
- Kim Geum Mi – Traditional Korean Singer (Pansori)
- Han Jeong Ae – Politician
- Jeong Jae Soon – Actress in TV dramas such as “Three Sisters”

== Gallery ==
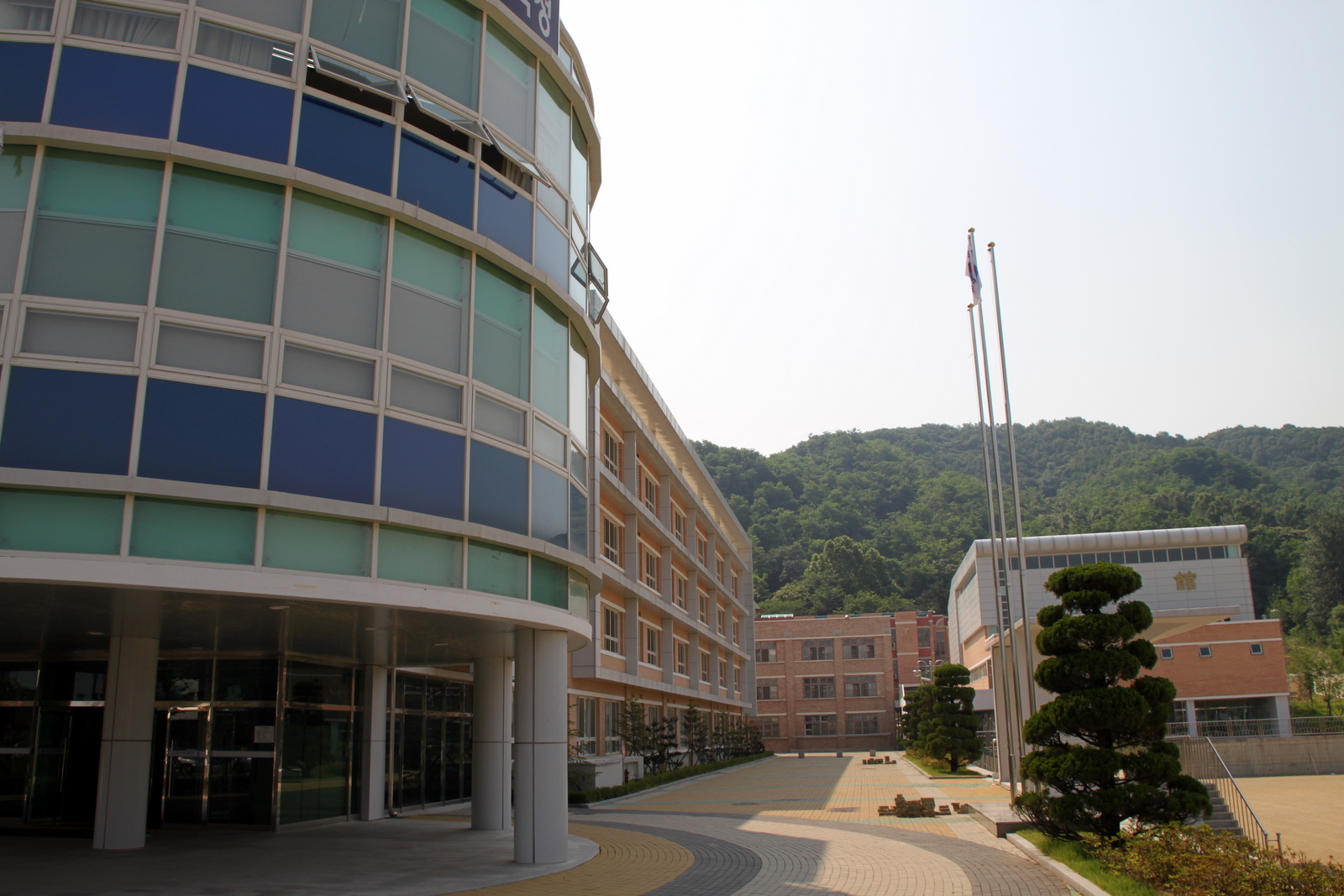
The School Entrance and Main Building

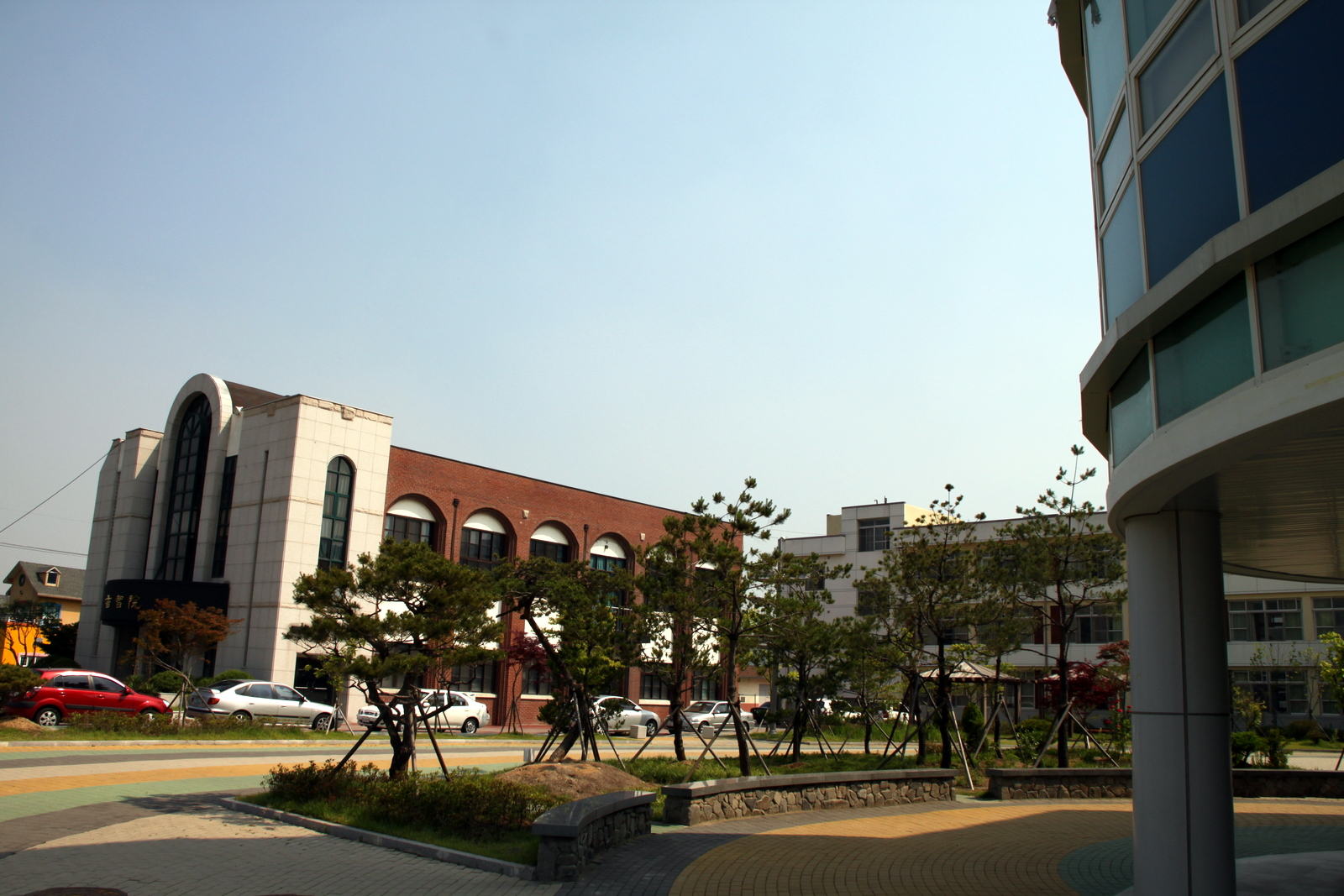
The Entrance and Library

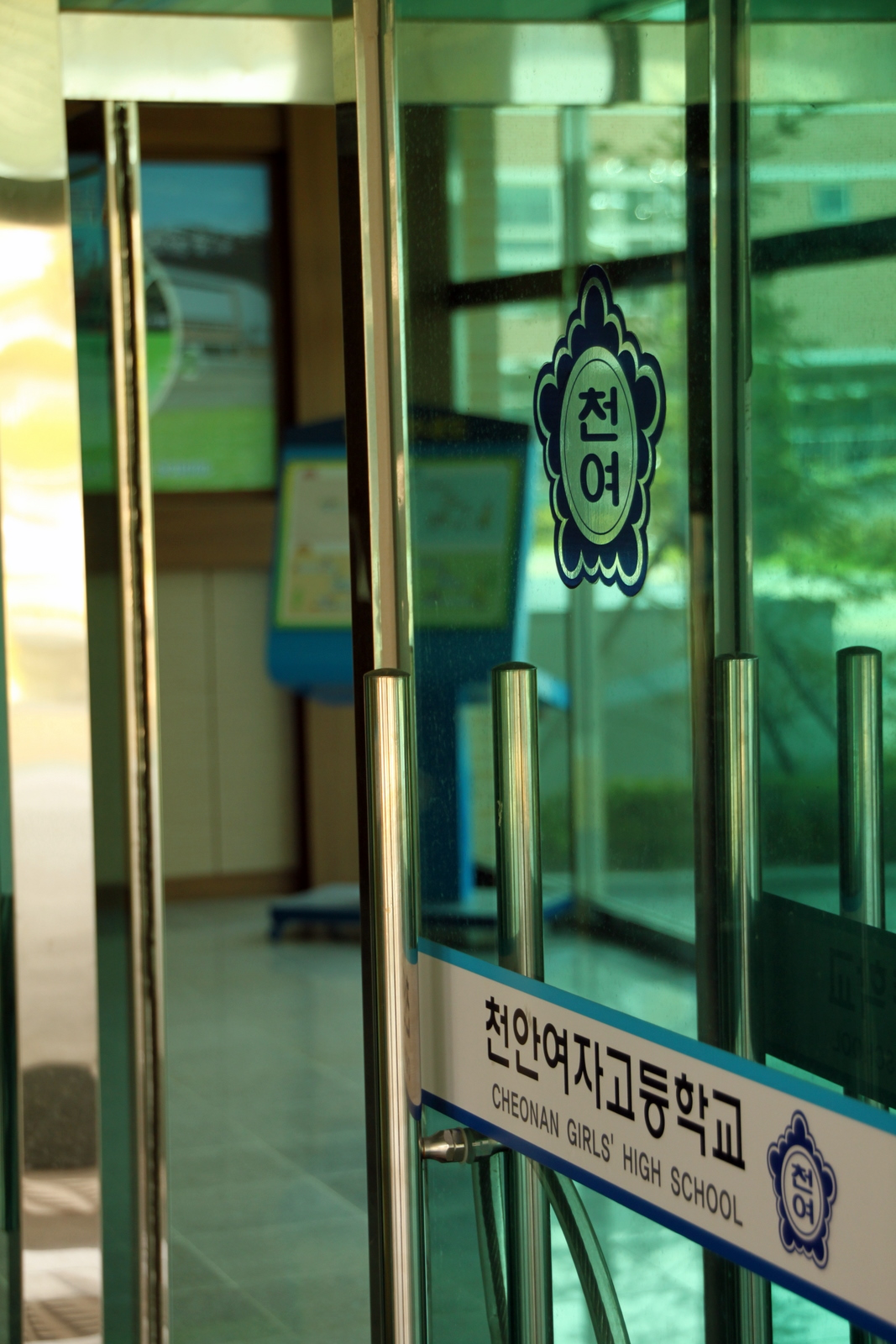
The School Crest on the main entrance doors

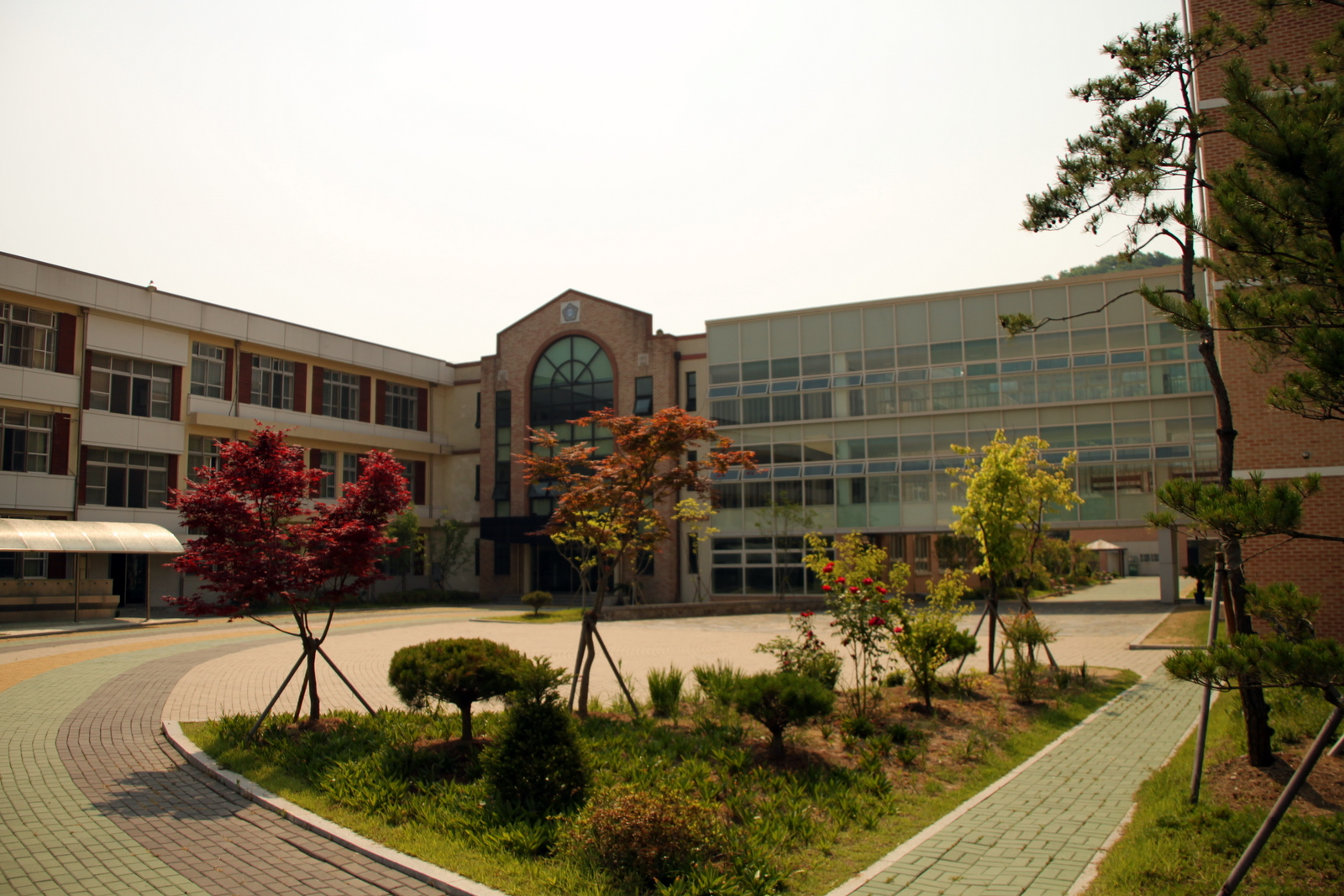
The Courtyard between the main building and 3rd grade wing

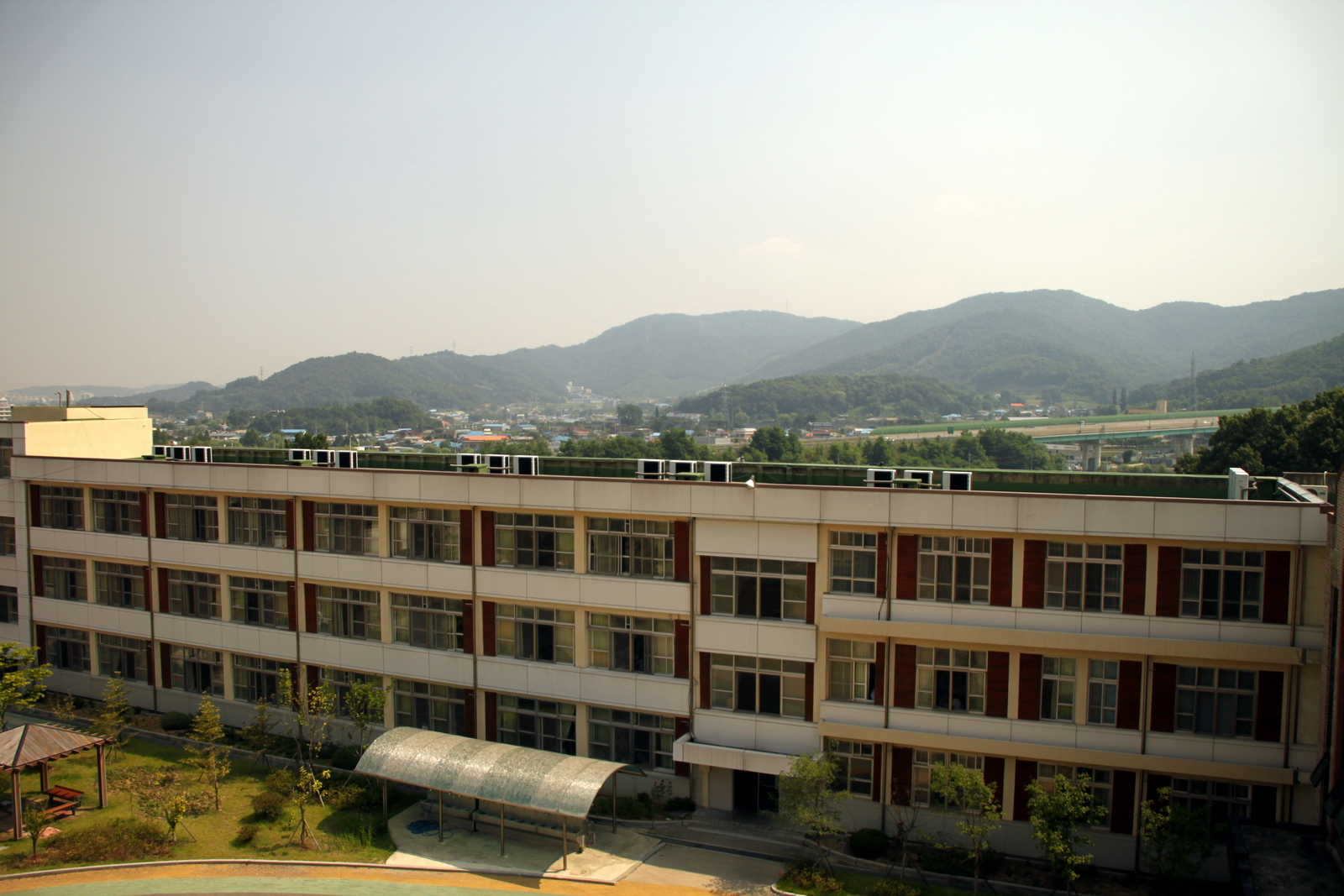
3rd grade wing and mountains

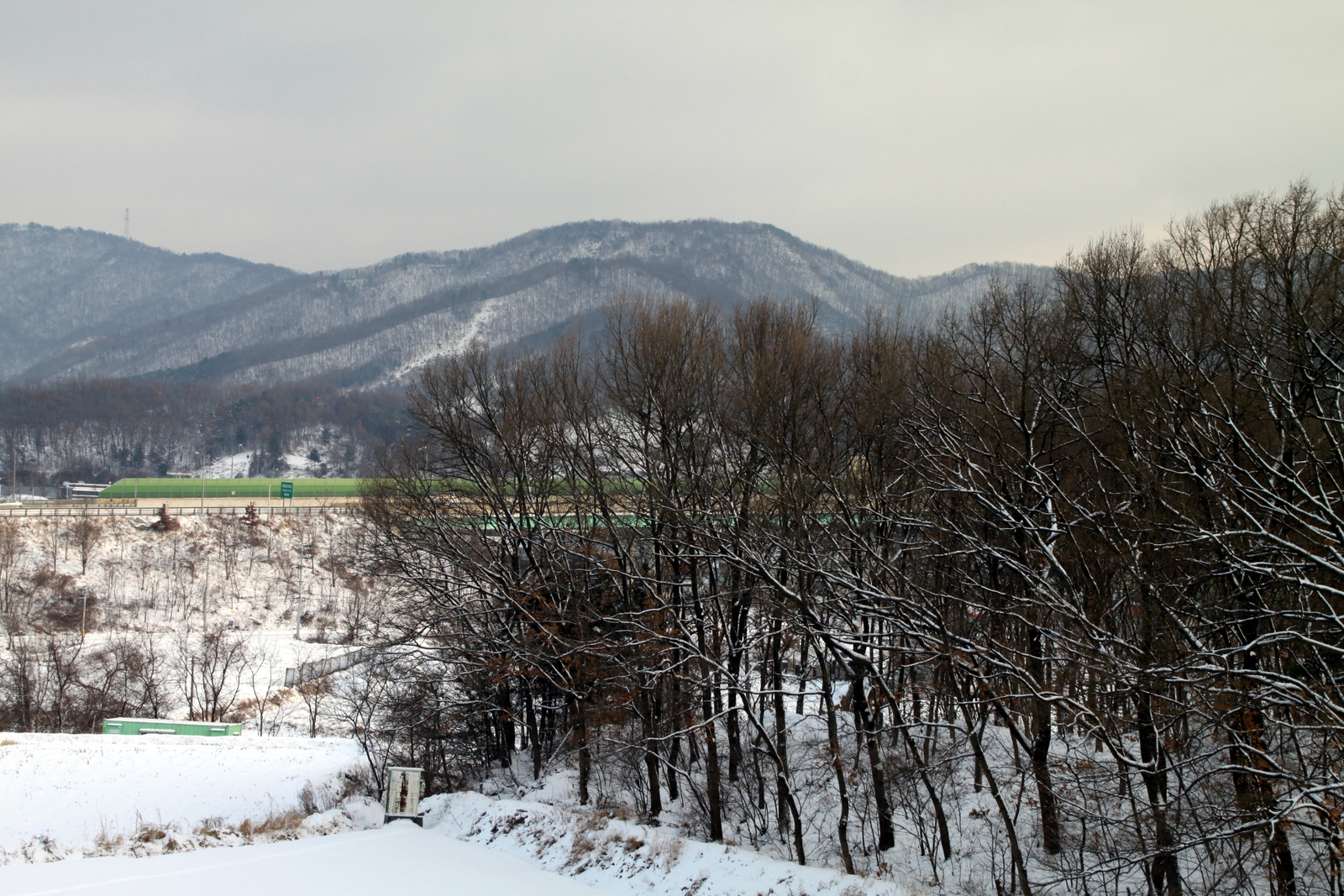
Mountains behind the school in Winter

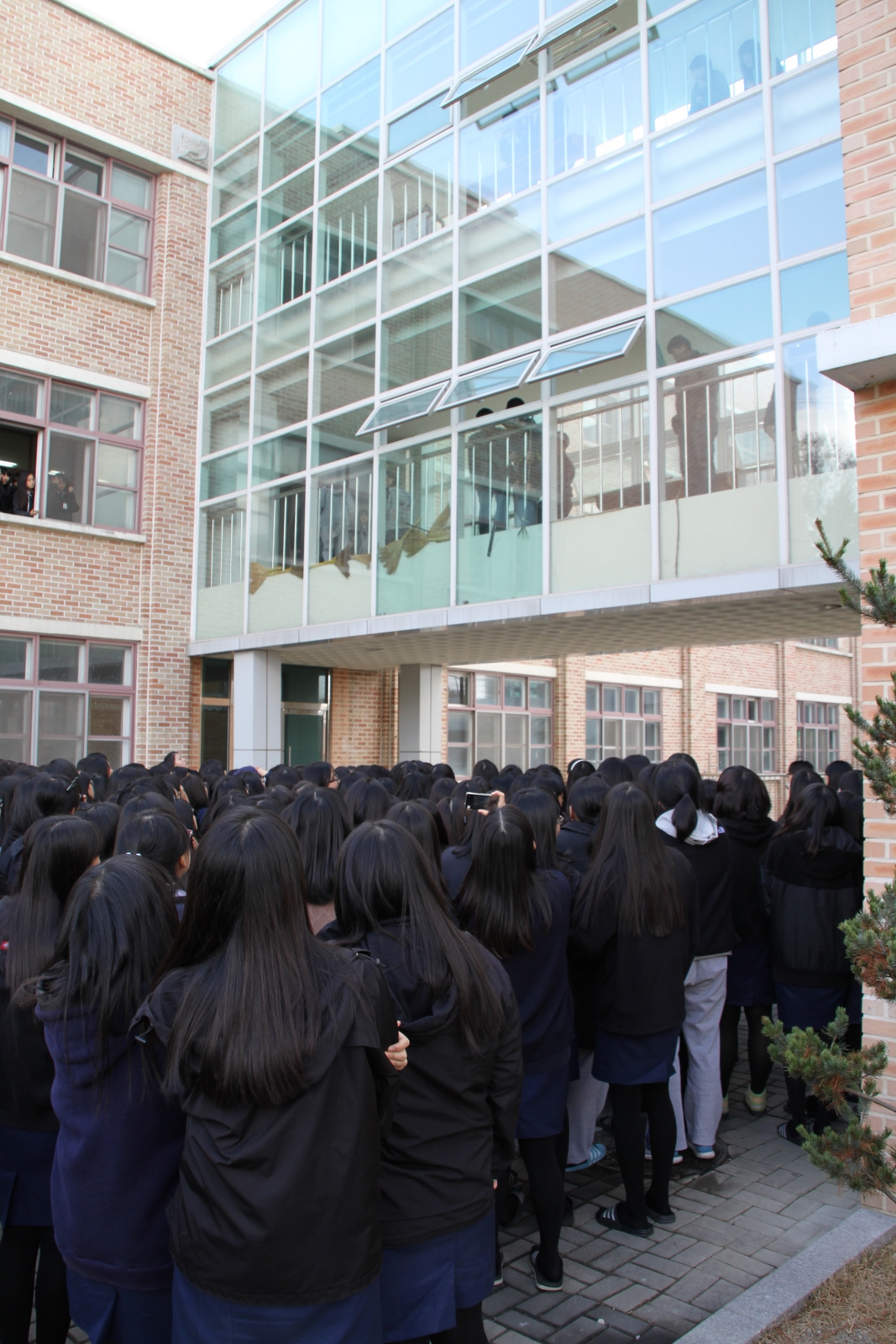
Students watch as teachers try to save a trapped sparrow

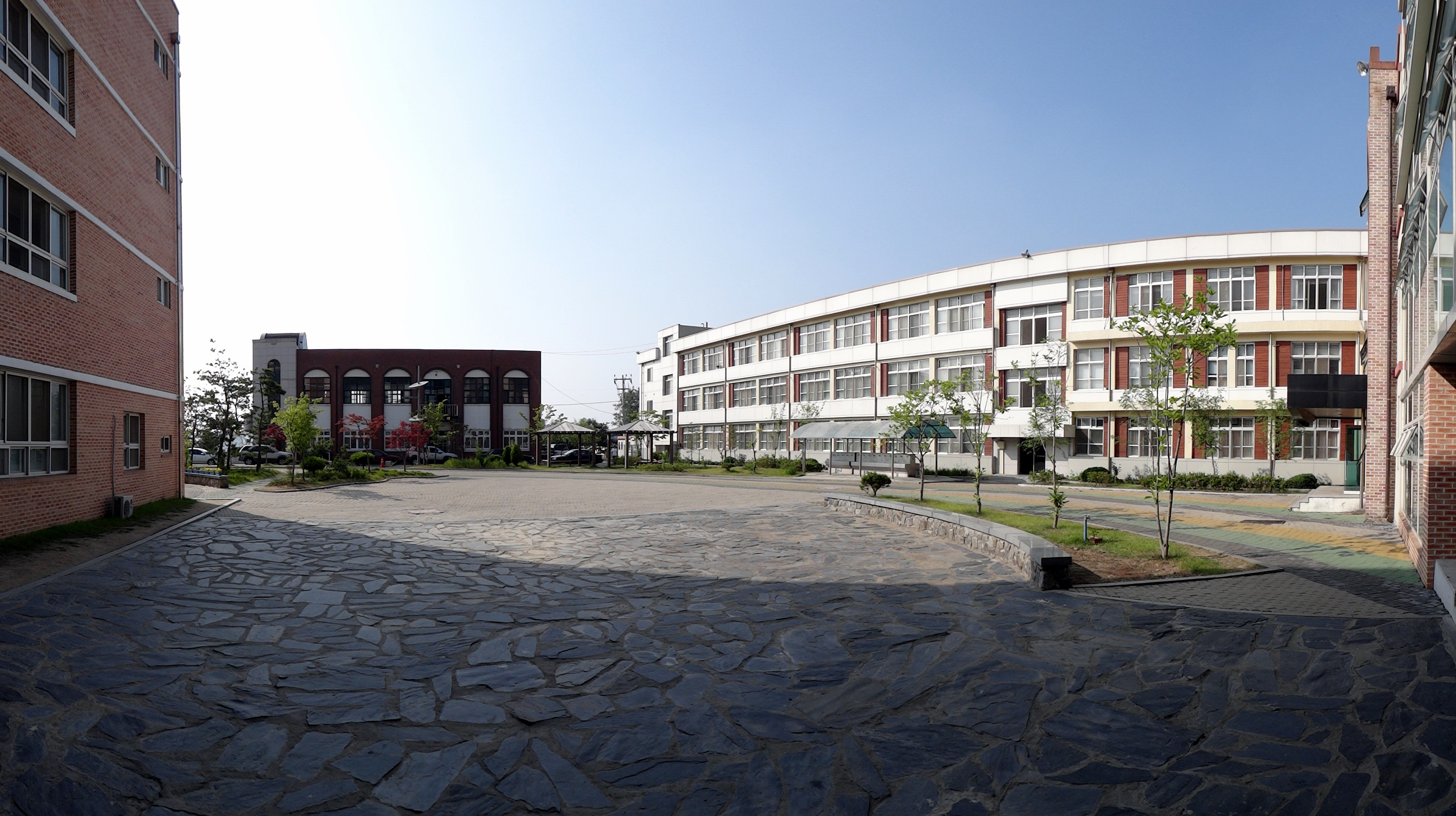
Panorama 1

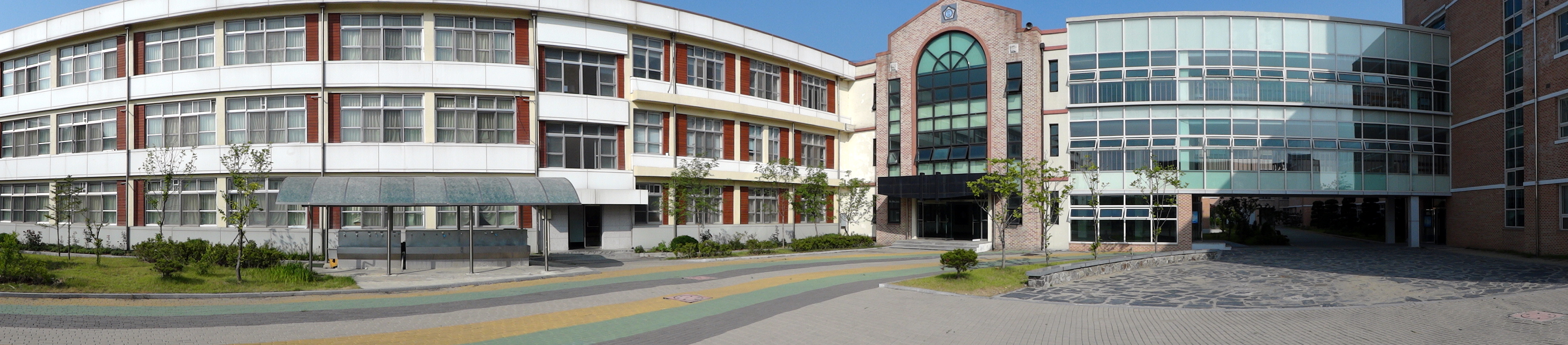
Panorama 2

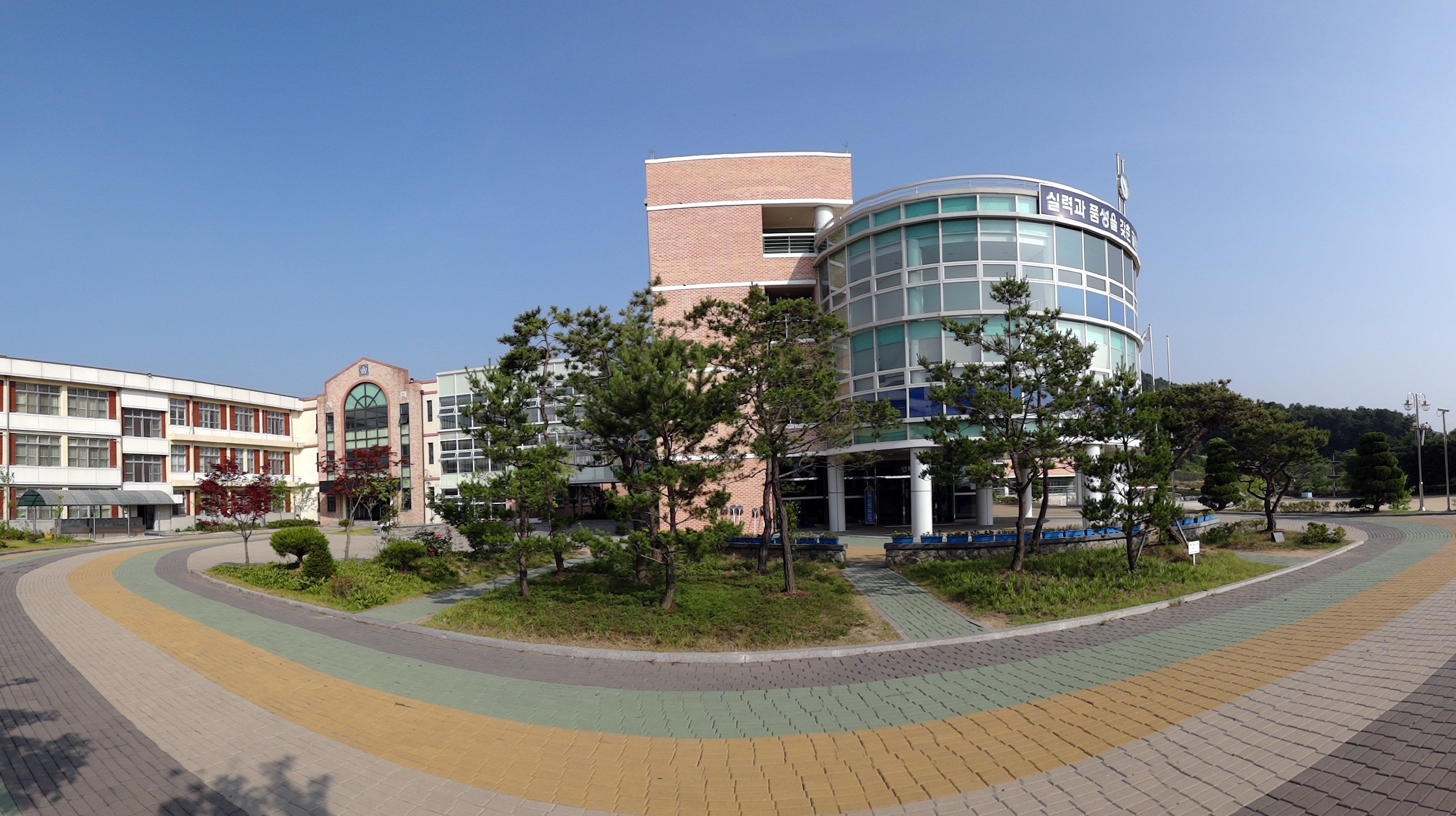
Panorama 3

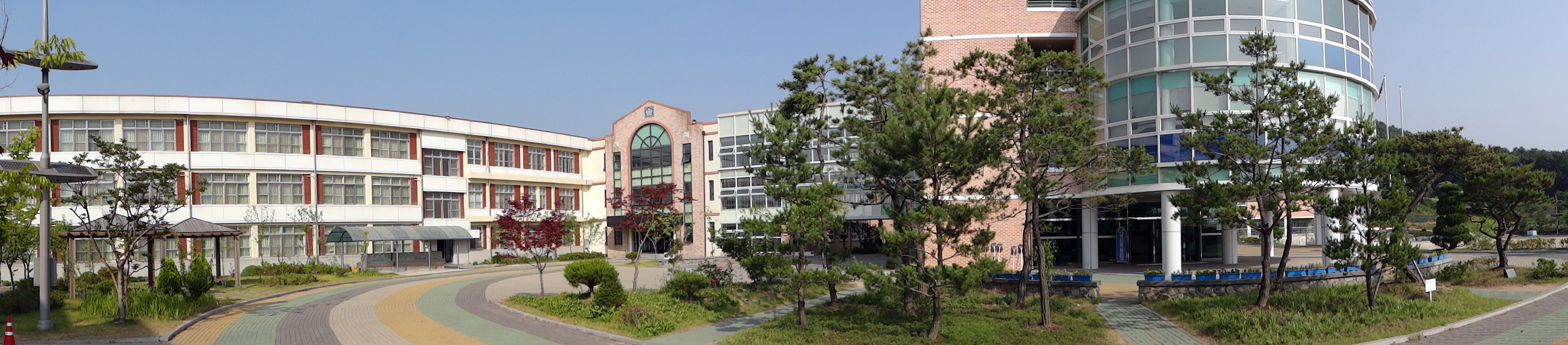
Panorama 4

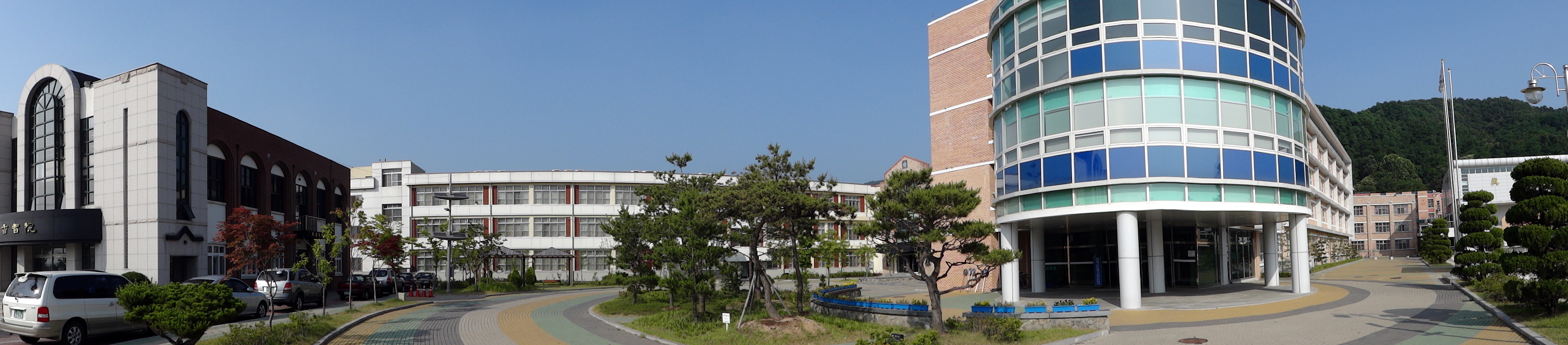
Panorama 5
