= Edinburgh Girls' High School =

Edinburgh Girls’ High School
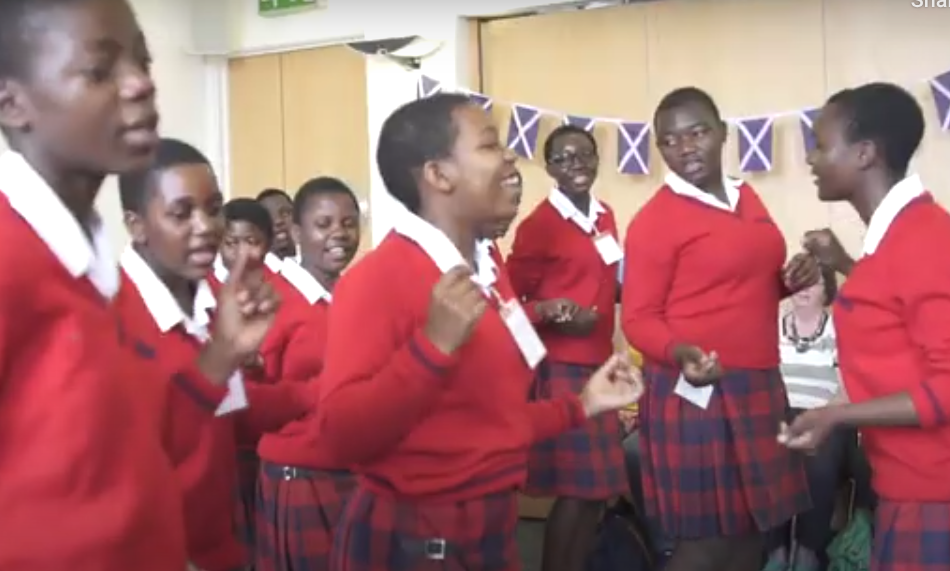
- Edinburgh Girls’ High School's choir on a visit to Edinburgh, Scotland in 2018

Location
- Engcongolweni, Mzimba District; Malawi
- 11°20′S 33°53′E

Information
- Motto: Mitis et fortis (Gentle and Brave)
- Established: 2004 (22 years ago)
- Principal: Mrs Masamba (in 2018)

Edinburgh Girls’ High School is an all-girls high school in the village of Engcongolweni in the Mzimba District of Northern Malawi. Its name comes from a long-running partnership with a school in Edinburgh, Scotland.

== History ==
Founded in 2006, the school provides an education to approximately 200 girls. The land was made available by the Mbano family to Janet Chesney who was inspired to create a school after teaching in Malawi for two years. Secondary education is not supplied by the state and families who can afford it, sometimes prioritise their son's education.

The site was chosen because it would make a high impact as there was little or no amenities. The school has low fees, because it is assisted by the Chesney Trust. The name of the school is a nod towards the Mary Erskine School in Edinburgh as the schools are partners. The two schools have the same uniform and motto. The Scottish school's community were very supportive when its Malawian clone was launched. The Scottish school plans to visit every two years.

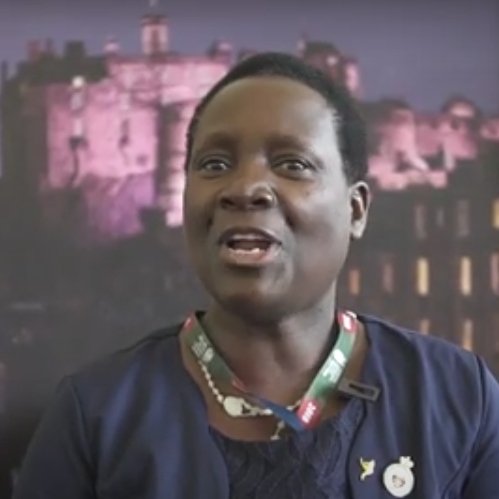
Mrs Masamba was head in 2018

In 2016 the girls took the Malawi School Certificate examinations and they exceeded the national average pass rate of about 60% with a rate of over 90%. Eleven girls had places at university that year.

In 2018, twenty girls and teachers from the school travelled over 7,000 miles to perform as the Royal Edinburgh Military Tattoo. They were befriended by the girl's choir from Mary Erskine School, as each of the girls was paired with a Scottish buddy. They danced and sang to over 220,000 people and they met Nicola Sturgeon was who Scotland's First Minister.

== School uniform ==
The school's uniform is the same as Mary Erskine School which features a navy blue and red kilt, a blue blazer, white blouse and red tie.

== Feeder school ==
Engcongolweni's local primary school was founded in 1954 by CCAP Synod of Livingstonia.
