= Italian Girls' School, Tripoli =

The Italian Girls' School, Tripoli was founded in 1877 and was the first girls' school in Libya. It was founded by Carolina Nunes Vais (1856–1932), a Jewish Italian educator from Livorno.

== History ==
The Italian Girls' School was founded in Tripoli in 1877 and was the first formal (Note: Prior to this, a small number of Jewish Italian girls had been sent to an informal Christian Girls' School and kindergarten, which had been established in 1846 and was run by nuns. Further references to this establishment are required.) school for young women in Libya. It was founded one year after the Italian Boys' School was established in Libya by Giannetto Paggi, who was also from Livorno.

The first Director of the Italian Girls' School was Carolina Nunes Vais, who was a Jewish teacher from Livorno in Italy. Vais was Director of the school until her death in 1932. Initially all the teachers were from Italy, however some Libyan women teachers began to be employed. However, in 1895 one Libyan sewing teacher was dismissed as her work was not at the standard required.

At the school's inception, the main subjects taught were Italian reading and writing, needlework, cookery and arithmetic. However from 1895 the curriculum included French, soon after English, History and Geography were also added. Nevertheless the general make-up of the teachers and students continued to be Italian and Jewish - to such an extent that Jewish subjects were introduced in the 1890s as well. The students were also largely from Tripoli's Jewish middle-class. In 1903 the school was teaching 241 young women.

By 1911, the Italian Girls' School in Tripoli had been joined by two further schools for young women: one in Benghazi and one in Khoms. The whole Italian colonial educational system in Libya had an annual budget of 100,000 francs and of that, in 1911, 12,500 was spent on the school and its 348 pupils.
