= Incheon Nonhyeon High School =

Coordinates: 37.40868°N 126.73266°E

Incheon Nonhyeon High School 인천논현고등학교
- Incheon; South Korea

Information
- Type: Public
- Established: 2006
- Principal: Jang In-seon
- Deputy Principal: Choi Geun-hwan
- Faculty: 69
- Gender: Girls
- Enrolment: 828
- Website: http://nh.icehs.kr/

Incheon Nonhyeon High School (Korean: 인천논현고등학교) is a general public high school located in Namdong, Incheon. Following the standard South Korean education grade level pattern, the school offers education in the upper secondary grades 10–12. Incheon has adopted the High School Equalization Policy (HSEP), making Incheon Nonhyeon High School a HSEP school.

== History ==
Incheon Nonhyeon High School was established on March 1, 2006. The school converted from a unisex school to an all-girls school in August 2011, taking effect from 2012 onwards with the new batch of students. There are a total of 2,381 graduates as of February 10, 2015. Current principal Jang In-seon was appointed on September 1, 2015, as the 3rd principal.
