= Arch-Bishop Okoth Ojolla Girls School =

- Kisumu, Nyanza Province; Kenya

The Arch-Bishop Okoth Ojolla Girls Secondary School is a situated a few miles from Kisumu, in Nyanza Province, Kenya. The school is located in the Kisumu Rural constituency in Otwenya. It is a boarding school which provides education for orphaned and vulnerable girls.

Kisumu, a port city in Western Kenya, is the third largest city in the country, with a 2009 population of 259,000.

Circa 2010 the school had 182 enrolled students and a teaching staff of 14 — a ratio of 13:1.
