= Renganaden Seeneevassen SSS =

Renganaden Seeneevassen State Secondary School

Location
- Jenner Street; Port Louis; Mauritius
- Coordinates: 20.1751339°S 57.505455900000015°E

Information
- Motto: In pursuit of excellence
- Established: 1910
- Gender: Female
- Colours: White & Navy blue
- Nickname: R4S
- Website: http://rssss.edu.govmu.org

Renganaden Seeneevassen State Secondary School is a state school based in Port Louis, Mauritius. The school is named after Renganaden Seeneevassen, the first Mauritian Minister of Education.

== See also ==
- Education in Mauritius
- List of secondary schools in Mauritius
