= Chung Eui Girls' High School =

Methodist school in Pyongyang, North Korea

- 정의고등녀학교
- Pyongyang; North Korea

Information
- Religious affiliation: Methodist
- Established: 1896
- Gender: Female

- Chung Eui Girls' High School
- Chosŏn'gŭl: 정의고등녀학교
- Hancha: 正義高等女學校
- Revised Romanization: Jeongui-godeung-yeohakgyo
- McCune–Reischauer: Chŏngŭi-godŭng-nyŏhakkyo

Chung Eui Girls' High School was a Methodist girls' school in Pyongyang, North Korea, founded in 1896.

== History ==
The school was founded by Methodist missionary Mattie W. Noble on November 26, 1896, starting from educating 9 women, and the school taught elementary level reading. In 1899, Methodist missionary E. Douglas Follwell continued the works of the school. The school used to be run cooperatively with the Presbyterian church, but became independent from it in 1918. In 1920, Dillingham became the principal for the school, and improved the accommodations.

== Notable alumni ==
- Lee Tai-young
