= Engcongolweni =

- Location in Malawi
- Coordinates: 11°20′S 33°53′E
- Country: Malawi
- Region: Northern Region
- Time zone: +2

Engcongolweni is a village about 22 kilometres (14 mi) North-West of Mzuzu along the M1 road, in the Mzimba district of Malawi. The primary school was founded in 1954 and the Edinburgh Girls’ High School is located here.

== Church ==
The village has a Church of Central Africa Presbyterian minister who is replaced every few years. The minister is responsible for a wide area including nine prayer houses.

== Education ==
In 1954 Engcongolweni primary school opened. It was organised by the Church of Central Africa Presbyterian – Synod of Livingstonia. The school has had over 600 pupils and it has partnered with Donibristle Primary School in Dalgety Bay.

The village is the home to the unusually named Edinburgh Girls’ High School which is a private school for about 150 girls (in about 2016). The school has low fees because it is funded by the Chesney Trust. The name of the school is a nod towards the Mary Erskine School in Edinburgh as the schools are partners and the school plans to visit every two years.

In 2016 the girls took the Malawi School Certificate examinations and they exceeded the national average pass rate of about 60% with a rate of over 90%.

The Chesney Trust founded the secondary school and it has also been involved in the building of a maize mill, an improved water supply and a bridge. The village is twinned with Dalgety Church and they assisted with improving the water supply which supports about 7,500 people.
