= Noh Cheonmyeong =

South Korean poet (1912–1957)

- Born: September 2, 1912; Biseok, Suntaek, Chōen County, Kōkai Province, Korea, Empire of Japan
- Died: December 10, 1957 (aged 45); Seoul, South Korea
- Education: Ewha Womans University
- Writing career
- Period: 1932–1960

Korean name
- Hangul: 노천명
- Hanja: 盧天命
- RR: No Cheonmyeong
- MR: No Ch'ŏnmyŏng

Noh Cheonmyeong (Korean: 노천명; September 2, 1912 – December 10, 1957) was an early-modern South Korean poet.

== Biography ==
Noh Cheonmyeong was born on September 2, 1912, in Kōkai Province, Korea, Empire of Japan. In 1934 Noh graduated with a B.A. in English from Ewha Womans University. Noh was a participant in the Drama Arts Society and a reporter for several newspapers including the Choson Chungang Ilbo, Maeil Sinbo, Seoul Shinmun, and Punyo Shinmun. Noh also worked as a lecturer at Sorabol Arts College, Ewha Womans University, and Kookmin University. Noh died in 1957.

During the Korean War, Noh was convicted of being involved in anti-government activities and sentenced to twenty years in jail. After the efforts of writers Kim Gwangseop and Lee Heongu, Noh was released after serving six months.

== Work ==
Noh made her literary debut with publication of her poem, "Nae cheongchunui baeneun" in Siwon. Her posthumous collection, Songs of Deer was published in 1958, and in 1960, her family published the Collected Works of Noh Chon-myong.

The Literature Institute of Korea summarizes Noh's contributions to Korean Literature:

Noh's first collection of poems, Coral Forest (Sanhorim), Noh evokes a world of nostalgia through carefully framed recollections of her childhood. Pieces such as "Self-portrait"(Jahwasang) and "Deer" (Saseum) are existential explorations of solitude. Her second collection, Changbyeon, which was published after Korean independence from Japan, expanded upon the themes in her Coral Forest melancholy, solitude, love and nostalgia and is often considered an extension of her first collection. Both volumes are characterized by a lyrical intertwining of solitude and nostalgia in simple, delicate language. The poems at once delineate the solitary space where connection with another is impossible and express a kind of anti-nostalgia in the hopes of transcending the past.

== Works in Korean (Partial) ==
- A Forest of Coral (Self-published, 1938)
- By the Window (Maeil Shinbo-sa, 1945)
- Gazing at the Stars (Huimang Publisher, 1953)
- Songs of Deer (Hallim-sa, 1958)
- Collected Works of Chon-myong (Chonmyongsa, 1960)
