= Youngpa Girls' High School =

Coordinates: 37.5327°N 127.1203°E

- Korean: 영파 여자 고등학교; Hanja: 英波女子高等學校
- Seoul Songpa-gu; Olympic-ro 565 (Pungnab-dong 501); South Korea

Information
- Type: Private
- Motto: Clean Mind, Kind Behavior, Beautiful Figure
- Opened: October 20, 1967
- Authority: Academy of Youngpa
- Principal: Choi Ui Yeong
- Staff: 120 (2012년)
- Enrollment: 1,655 (2012)
- Website: youngpa.hs.kr

Youngpa Girl's High School(英波女子高等學校)is located in Seoul Songpa-gu Pungnap-dong General Private Girl's High School.

== History of School ==
- 1967 March 20 : Established by Educational Foundation「Academy of Youngpa」
- 1972 December 2 : Youngpa Girl's General High school (total 15 classes)
- 1973 October 29 : Changing name(General High School → Academic High School)
- 1976 January 18 : The First Graduation Ceremony
- 1979 December 30 : High School Rebuilding(Basement, 5th floor)
- 1982 November 10 : Class and Auditorium Extension
- 2001 March 2 : From Freshman reduction classes to 21 classes
- 2002 March 2 : From Freshman reduction classes to 20 classes
- 2003 March 2 : From Freshman reduction classes to 18 classes
