= Hwang Yun-suk =

South Korean judge (1929–1961)

Prosecutor, Seoul District Prosecutor's Office
- In office 1953–1954

Judge of the Seoul District Court
- In office 1954–1961

Personal details
- Born: 1926
- Died: 21 April 1961 (aged 31–32)

Korean name
- Hangul: 황윤석
- Hanja: 黃允石
- RR: Hwang Yunseok
- MR: Hwang Yunsŏk

Hwang Yun-suk (Korean: 황윤석; 1929 – 21 April 1961) was the first female judge in South Korea.

== Career ==
Hwang graduated from Jinmyeong Girls' High School, and went on to study in the Faculty of Law at Seoul National University. She passed the third annual Higher Civil Service Examination in 1952. She took office as a prosecutor in the Seoul District Prosecutor's Office in 1953. In September 1954, she was appointed a judge of the First Civil Division of the Seoul District Court, and held that position until her death.

South Korea's first female court clerk, Park Gyeong-sun (박경순; 朴京順), began working for Hwang in 1960.

== Death and legacy ==
Hwang was found dead on the morning of 21 April 1961. There is speculation she was killed by her in-laws or her husband.

The Yun-suk Scholarship was established in her memory at her alma mater Jinmyeong Girls' High School in April 1962, on the first anniversary of her death, with an endowment of ₩1.5 million.
