= Youngshin Girls' High School (Gyeonggi) =

Youngshin Girls' High School 영신여자고등학교

Location
- Omokcheon-dong, Gwonseon-gu; Suwon, Gyeonggi Province; South Korea

Information
- Established: 1975
- Principal: Jang Gyeong-ae
- Deputy Principal: Oh Byeong-hee
- Gender: Girls
- Bird: Magpie
- Tree: Pine tree
- Flower: Rose
- Website: http://www.ysg.hs.kr/

Youngshin Girls' High School (Korean: 영신여자고등학교) is a private high school in Suwon, Gyeonggi Province.

== History ==
Youngshin Girls' High School was founded on November 29, 1974. It was then established on March 7, 1975, on the same day as the school's first entrance ceremony. Current principal Jang Gyeong-ae was appointed on March 1, 2013 as the 10th principal. As of February 2, 2015, there are a total of 17,215 graduates.
