= School for hakımāt =

School for hakımāt was a medical school for girls in Abu Zaabal in Egypt, founded in 1832. It gave women a medical training to enable them to give medical care for women patients in a Muslim society with gender segregation. It was a pioneer school for the educational history for women in Egypt.

== Background ==
The school was founded by the French physician Antoine-Barthelemy Clot (Bey) on the order of Muhammad Ali Pasha. Muhammad Ali Pasha wished for the public to become vaccinated, and had founded a medical school for men in 1827. However, the customary Islamic gender segregation made it impossible for men to perform vaccination on female patients, and therefore there was a need to educate female medical practitioners.

However, the customary Islamic gender segregation made it difficult to enroll females in school, so Antoine Barthelemy Clot had to buy 24 Sudanese and Ethiopian girls in the Egyptian slave market to acquire students for his school.

== Foundation and activity ==
The students were given a six-year program, in which they were instructed to read and write Arabic, to vaccinate against smallpox, to bleed, perform obstetric maneuvers, to treat and report cases of syphilis, to register births and deaths, aas well as to conduct postmortems on female corpses. Upon graduation, the students received a military rank, and were married to officers of similar rank.

The medical education they were given were not defined as that of physicians, nurses or midwives; they were referred to as hakımāt, and was to perform medical services for women of the harem without breaking the customary Islamic gender segregation. The hakımāt were popular because of this function they fulfilled in favor of gender segregation, but their status and salary was low. The school gradually defined to become a midwife school in 1882.

== Legacy ==
The School for hakımāt was a pioneer school for the educational history for women in Egypt; a regular school for women were not founded until the Suyufiyya Girls' School in 1873.
