= Suyufiyya Girls' School =

Suyufiyya Girls' School or al-Madrasa al-Suyufiyya was a school for girls in Egypt.

Founded in 1873, it was Egypt's first officially sponsored girls' school. It had the backing of Khedive Ismail's third wife, Jashem Afet Hanum. Prior to its foundation, there had been the special medical school School for hakımāt, as well as a school from 1853 reserved only for Coptic Christian girls.

In the late 1870s it merged with another girls' school for poorer students, al-Qarabiyya, leading to a drop in enrollment as upper-class parents abandoned the school. In 1889 the Ministry of Education tried to revive the school under the name al-Saniyya, but parents seem to have objected to mixing better-off and poorer students at the school.

== Notable alumni ==
- Tawhida Abdel-Rahman (1906–1974), doctor
