= Antsahamanitra Boarding School for Girls =

Private school in Antananarivo, Madagascar

Antsahamanitra Boarding School for Girls was a private boarding school for girls in Antananarivo, Madagascar. The school was founded by Johanne Borchgrevink, a Norwegian Missionary Society missionary, in 1872, and continued until 1912, when Borchgrevink and her husband retired and returned to Norway.
