= Al-Najah Secondary School =

School in Al-Bireh, Ramallah and al-Bireh, Palestine

- مدرسة النجاح الثانوية

Location
- (Palestine) Al-Bireh; Palestine
- Coordinates: 31.922°N 35.2120°E

Information
- Established: 1995
- Gender: All-girls
- Language: Arabic, English
- Website: Official website

Al-Najah Secondary School is a High School in the Al-Baloua neighborhood, Al-Bireh city, Palestine. It was founded in 1995.
