= Union-Chrétienne de Saint Chaumond (Spain) =

- Unión Cristiana de Saint Chaumond

Location
- C/ Rodríguez Marín 30 - 32 28002 - Madrid
- Coordinates: 40.4457963°N 3.6811166999999614°W

Information
- Website: saintchaumond.es

Union-Chrétienne de Saint Chaumond (Spanish: Unión Cristiana de Saint Chaumond) is a French Catholic private international school for girls, located in Madrid, Spain. It serves petite section through terminale, the final year of lycée (senior high school/sixth form college).
