= Aurore Storckenfeldt =

Swedish reform pedagogue

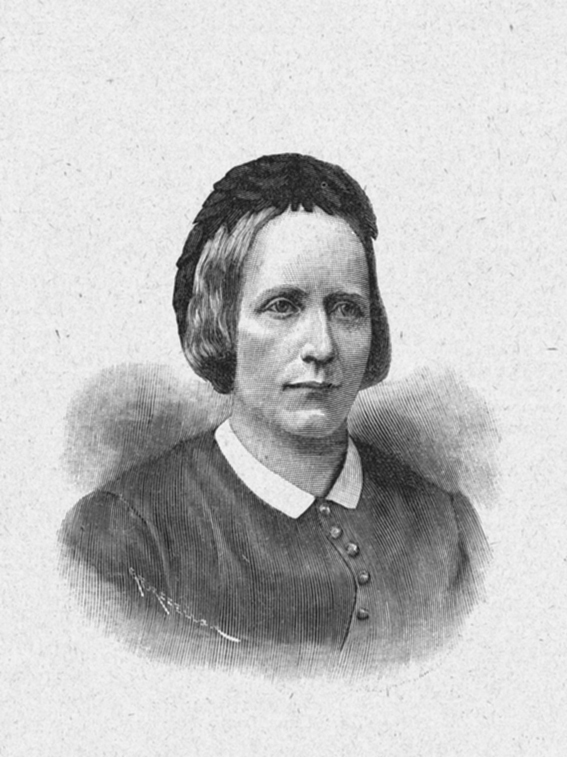
Aurore Storckenfeldt Portrait

Hedvig Amalia Aurora "Aurore" Storckenfeldt (26 December 1816 in Varnum – 21 July 1900 in Jönköping) was a Swedish reform pedagogue. She founded the Storckenfeldtska skolan (The Storchefeldt School) in Jönköping and served as its principal in 1847–1891, during which time it was regarded as one of the best educational institutions for females in the nation. Storckenfeldt is regarded as an important member of the pioneers of girl's education in the mid 19th century Sweden, who reformed the education of girls by establishing girls' schools which offered proper academic education for females, in contrast to the earlier girl's pensions shallow education.

== Life ==
Aurore Storckenfeldt was the daughter of the nobleman and captain Johan Adam Storckenfeldt and Magdalena Christina Uggla. She was given the education regarded appropriate for a female of her class at the time: French language, the Bible and etiquette. However, she was given private lessons by her vicar in academic subjects, which inspired her to become an autodidact. She is also believed to have been inspired by the works of Fredrika Bremer.

After the death of her father, she supported herself as a governess. She was critical of the shallow education normally offered to women. In the 1840s, there were a growing demand of a reform of women's education to provide middle class women who were forced to support themselves with an education by which they could manage a profession suitable for their class and be useful for society. At the time of the introduction of the compulsory elementary school in Sweden in 1842, there were only five schools in Sweden to provide academic education and secondary education to females; Societetsskolan (1786), Fruntimmersföreningens flickskola (1815) and Kjellbergska flickskolan (1833) in Gothenburg, Askersunds flickskola (1812) in Askersund and Wallinska skolan (1831) in Stockholm.

In 1847, Aurore Storckenfeldt founded the Storchefeldt School in Jönköping with room for 20 students to meet the demand for higher academic education for potentially professional middle class women. She herself was a teacher of bible, history and English language. Described as strict but skillful and interested, she made study trips in Europe. The school became one of the most notable academic institutions for women in contemporary Sweden. She also occasionally accepted poor students who could not afford a fee. From 1874, the school was given government support in accordance of the Flickskolekommittén 1866.
