= Hammarstedtska skolan =

Famous Swedish girls' school

Hammarstedtska skolan (Hammarstedt School), also known as Hammarstedtska flickpensionen (Hammarstedt Girl's Pension) and Hammarstedtska pensionen (Hammarstedt Pension) was a Swedish Girls' school, active for most of the 19th century in Stockholm. It was regarded as one of the most exclusive of its kind in 19th-century Stockholm. The school was named after its principals, and therefore changed name several times: from the 1830s until 1881, it was therefore named as Bjurströmska pensionen (Bjurström Pension), Kockska pensionen (Kock Pension), Posseska pensionen (Posse Pension) and, finally, as Hammarstedtska pensionen (Hammarstedt Pension).

== History ==
=== Bjurströmska pensionen ===
The school was founded by the niece and heir of Sophie Hagman, mamsell Augusta Bjurström, and called Bjurströmska pensionen (Bjurström Pension) after her. It attracted clients from the upper classes and was regarded as the most prominent educational institution for females in Stockholm in the 1830s. As such it was a successor of the Johanna Lohm's school. It was the foremost competitor to Wallinska skolan, which was founded in 1831.

The school was a typical example of the contemporary conventional girls' school and was in actuality a finishing school focused on accomplishments. When Olof Fryxell was engaged as a teacher at the school, he left the school after a conflict with the students' parents, who were opposed to him introducing the subject of human anatomy and the art of ice skating.

Among its students were Sophie Adlersparre, who was a pupil there in 1836–1838, and Ebba Ramsay.

=== Kockska pensionen ===
In the 1840s, the Bjurströmska pensionen was taken over by Sophie Antoinette Kock from Germany, and called Kockska pensionen (Kock Pension) after her.

During the tenure of Kock, the school was renowned for its high quality in language education. At the time, languages was the foremost criteria for an educated woman, and Kock offered education in German, French and English, all offered by teachers from the respective countries in question. Kock employed university educated (male) teachers in most of the subjects.

The school was somewhat progressive for its time. No education was offered in needlework, which was otherwise a compulsory subject in schools for girls, and the education was considered of high quality for a girls' school. However, the method was still merely education by listening, and no homework was given.

=== Posseska pensionen ===
In 1852, the Kockska pensionen was taken over by the unmarried noblewoman Sophia Posse, and called Posseska pensionen (Posse Pension) after her.

Sophia Posse was a student of Cecilia Fryxell, had been active as a teacher at the school of Fryxell and educated on a government scholarship in Germany, where she studied the educational methods in Christiansfeld and the work of Amalia Sieweking in Hamburg. Posse was recommended for her passion for education and religion. Her school offered elementary subjects with focus on Christianity and language, and her methods were listening and practical use. She also employed university educated (male) teachers in most of the subjects.

=== Hammarstedtska skolan ===
In 1855, the Posseska pensionen was taken over by Frederique Hammarstedt, also a student of Cecilia Fryxell, and called Hammarstedtska pensionen (Hammarstedt Pension) after her.

During Hammarstedt's tenure the school was referred to as one of the most fashionable of its kind in 1860s Stockholm. It received about 100 students, many of them boarding students, from both Sweden and Finland. Still foremost a finishing school, it kept its good reputation in the subject of language, and continued to employ a majority of university educated (male) teachers. During the late 1850s, it offered three two years-classes with the subjects of religion, Swedish, German, French, English, geography, Swedish history, history, natural science, arithmetic, drawing, singing and gymnastics, many of them with highly respected teachers. The school was regarded as progressive for its kind: while girls' schools offered a foreign language, they generally only offered French while Hammarstedt offered also German and English, its German language classes being particularly renowned under its teacher Johannes Rohtlieb. Furthermore, Hammarstedt introduced hygiene, that is to say gymnastics, as soon as the 1850s, which was, at the time, radical.

Nevertheless, the school was still characterized as a conventional girls' school, with the goal of fostering girls as ideal ladies, wives and mothers rather than to achieve academic goals. Frederique Hammarstedt was commended for her ability to create a homelike atmosphere at the school, and for her strict adherence to the state church during a time when the Free churches spread rapidly, which concerned many conservatives.

In the 1870s, however, the school adjusted itself in accordance with the recommendations of the Girls' School Committee of 1866 and became an 8th class girls' school like the Royal Normal School for Girls of the Royal Seminary, and was thus transformed from a finishing school to a serious academic secondary girls' school.

Frederique Hammarstedt closed the school in 1881, and as it was not taken over by anyone else, the school was finally closed after about a half a century as the most fashionable school in Stockholm.

Among its famous students were the philanthropist Agda Montelius, the writer Gurli Linder and the artist Anna Billing.
