= Girls' School Committee of 1866 =

Swedish governmental committee

The Flickskolekommittén 1866 (Girls' School Committee of 1866), was a Swedish governmental committee established by the Swedish Parliament, the Riksdag, in 1866 to examine organization of female education in Sweden and produce suggestions of reforms and recommendations on how the policy regarding education for women should be organized. This was the first governmental committee of its kind, and was to have a large impact upon the educational system as well as gender roles and policy regarding women's rights in general in Sweden.

== Background and context ==
Since the introduction of a public compulsory school system for children of both sexes in 1842, education for females had been a constant question of debate for politicians as well as in intellectual circles: while the new school system allowed every male the opportunity to go from compulsory education to secondary education and finally university, the public school system was closed to females after 5th grade. Except for private teachers, only two educational institutions were open to females after puberty: the free pauper schools, which taught poor girls professions, and the girls' schools for students from the middle and upper classes. These existing girls schools were normally more or less equivalent to finishing schools, with the goal of making the student a "lady", and they were forcefully criticized for their shallow and "useless" education. In 1842, only five girls' schools offered a more serious academic secondary education: Wallinska skolan in Stockholm, Askersunds flickskola in Askersund, and Fruntimmersföreningens flickskola, Kjellbergska flickskolan and Societetsskolan in Gothenburg.

Since the introduction of public compulsory schools in 1842, progressive politicians had argued for the organisation of governmental secondary education for females: this would ensure a far better quality than when the secondary education was only provided by private schools, who were subjected to the views of their students conservative parents. The conservative view was that females should be educated in the home for the home; that education and knowledge could destroy the feminine qualities that distinguished women from men and cause distaste in women for the role of wife and mother; and that the idea of equality could not interfere with the order established by God. In parallel, Population growth had created a large number of women who could not marry and were forced to support themselves with few means to do so.

The reformists, who were initially motivated by the idea of Difference feminism, therefore started with the more efficient argument that although the first natural choice for a woman was always that of a wife and mother, not all women would be married, and those who could find no one to marry should be given the opportunity to support themselves without having to resort to the charity of relatives, criminality or prostitution. This argument was successful and caused several reforms in women's rights: equal inheritance rights in 1845; equal rights within trade and commerce in 1846, 1861 and 1864; the profession of teacher in the public school system in 1853; legal majority for unmarried women in 1858–63; access to the professions of Feldsher, organist and dentist in 1861 and the professions of telegraph- and postal offices in 1863. These reforms were in themselves arguments for the reformists, who stated that as females now had been given more rights from the state, it was also the task of the state to give them education to handle these rights. In 1856, the novel Hertha by Fredrika Bremer caused a debate of women's educational rights which led to the foundation of the female seminary Högre lärarinneseminariet in 1861. This raised the issue of governmental secondary education for girls, and after a heated debate in 1865–66, the committee was established to solve the policy of female education.

== Recommendations and results ==
According to the committee, the girls' schools task was a double one: to give a woman an education suitable for her to be a wife and mother and the complement of a man, which was a woman's first task; but also to give women an education which would make it possible for females to support themselves professionally as independent women within the educated professions which were newly opened to women, in the case they should not succeed in marrying.

The organisation of girls' schools recommended was in fact quite progressive, and was for the larger part equivalent to the organisation of the secondary education of males, the gymnasium: this would place the female students on the same level as the male ones who were qualified to enter university. Gymnastics, an innovative subject, was also a recommendation for health reasons. The committee recommended that girls' schools should offer a six years compulsory education, followed by voluntary two years; and that those students having completed eight years should be given some sort of exam equivalent to those given male students. The exceptions were mathematics and natural science, which were given a larger and more abstract part for males than those recommended for females: another difference was that while the German language was at the time the most important foreign language for male students, French retained that position for females. The committee also recommended that women be allowed to attend university: this would once and for all answer the questions about the scientific ability of females. The professions recommended for an educated woman were those of a medical doctor, apothecary, positions within the telegraph, postal-, custom and tax offices as well as the lower levels of the teaching professions: some of these professions had recently been opened to women.

In 1870, women were allowed to study medicine and the profession of doctor was opened to them; in 1873, women were allowed to attend university; and though no secondary schools for girls were provided by the government, those private girl's schools which met the qualifications received governmental support from 1874.

== Committee members ==
1. Chairperson: Adolf Leonard Nordwall, head of the ecclesiastical department's bureau for higher education
2. Carl Johan Bergman, founder of the Visby girls' school
3. Pehr Sjöbring, bishop
4. Gustaf Reinhold Rabe, teacher at the Högre lärarinneseminariet
5. Henrik Samuel Cederschiöld, founder of the girls' school in Växjö
