= Emily Nonnen =

British-Swedish writer, translator and artist

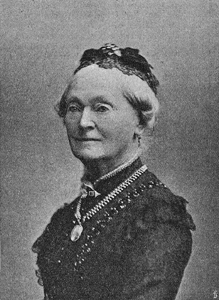
Emily Nonnen.

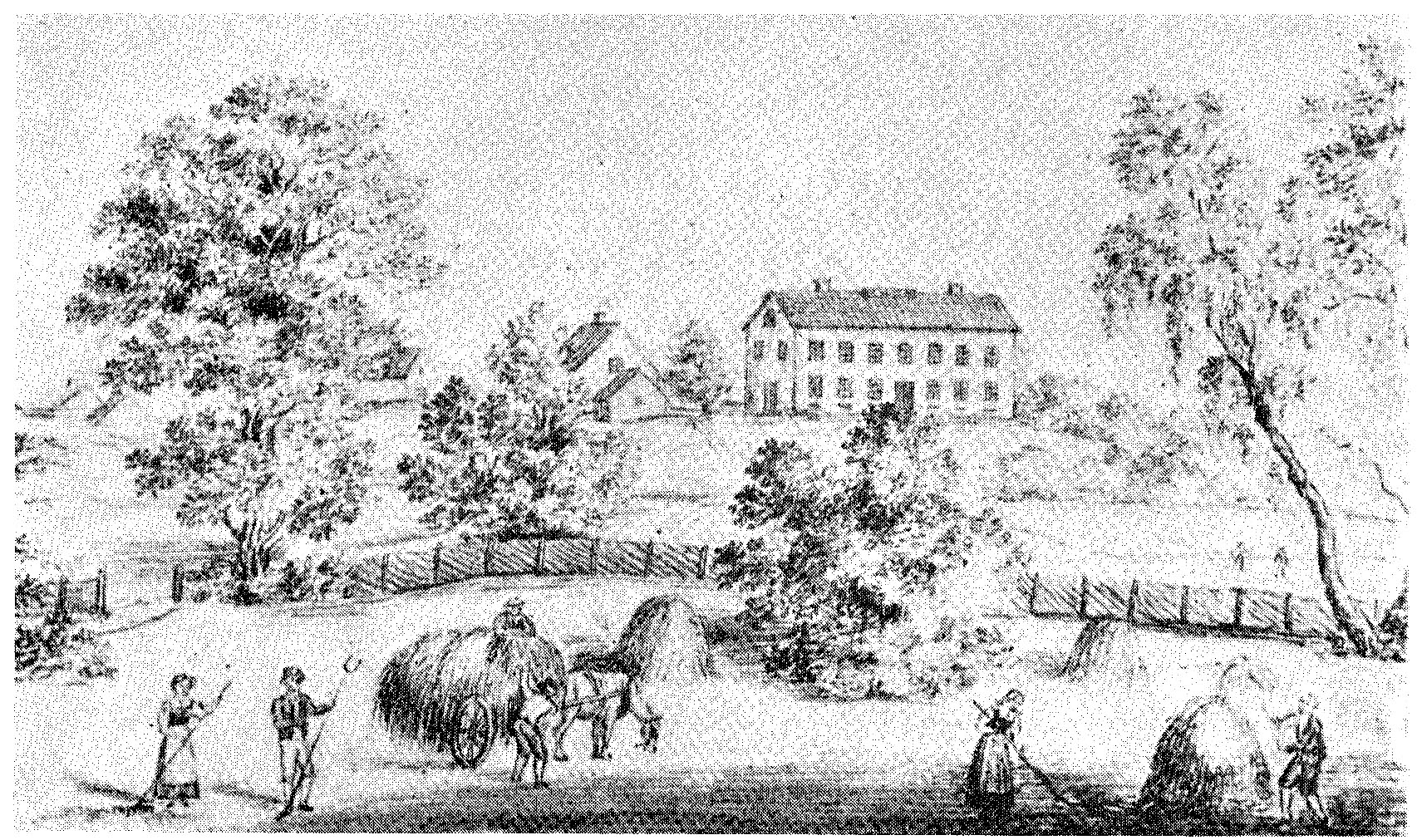
Degeberg farm with new manor house, cartoon by Emily Nonnen (1835).

Emily Nonnen (22 February 1812 – 19 January 1905) was a British-Swedish writer, translator and artist.

== Biography ==
Emily Nonnen was born 22 February 1812, London, Great Britain. She was the sister of Mary, Charlotte, Ann and Edward Nonnen. She moved to her maternal uncle in Sweden from Great Britain as a child. She was educated at the Societetsskolan.

She wrote novels for young adults and translated English literature to Swedish, among them Alice’s Adventures in Wonderland by Lewis Carroll. She also translated Swedish-language poets' work into English.

She died 19 January 1905, in Gothenburg, Sweden.

== Legacy ==
The Nonnensgatan (Nonnenstreet) in Bö in Gothenburg was named after the Nonnen sisters in 1944.
