= Mathilda Hall =

Swedish educator (1833–1894)

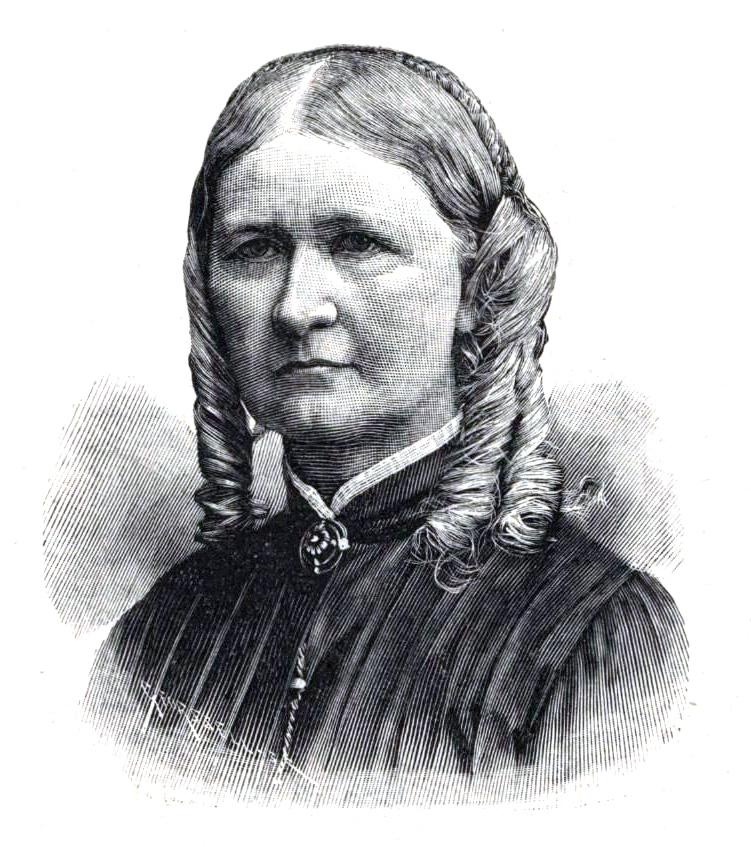

Mathilda Hall (1833-1894) was a Swedish educator.

She was the founder and principal of the Mathilda Hall School (Swedish: Mathilda Halls skola: 1857-1938) of Gothenburg. She was a pioneer of women's education as the founder of one of the most notable private educational institutions for women in Sweden at the time. She was educated at the Societetsskolan and then in the Netherlands. Her ambition with her school was to found a school to provide girls with serious academic education. This was during a time period when many schools such as hers were established by local school pioneers around Sweden, and she was the local Gothenburg pioneer. Her school remained one of the most fashionable and modern for girls in Gothenburg, known for its many schools for girls, for many decades after her death.
