= Fredrique Hammarstedt =

Swedish educator

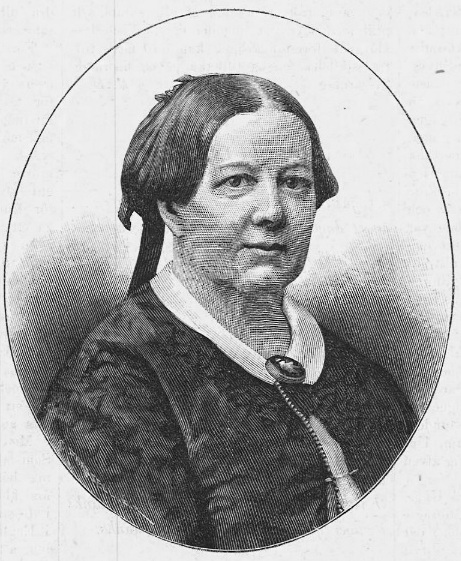
Swedish educator Fredrique Hammarstedt

Fredrique Hammarstedt (1823-1901) was a Swedish educator.

She was born to the tobacco merchan Teodor Benjamin Unge (d. 1827) and Antoinetta Lovisa Hård af Segerstad. She was one of the first students of the Wallinska skolan. As an adult she worked as a governess and then as a teacher in the school of Cecilia Fryxell.

She was the founder and principal of the girls' school Hammarstedtska skolan in Stockholm in 1855-1881. She took over the school from Sophia Posse and refounded it as her own. Her school was one of the most fashionable institutions for women's education in the Swedish capital during her life time, attracting aristocratic students from both Sweden and Finland, and as its principal she was an important and well known public figure at the time. She also managed a charity soup kitchen in the school dining room.

Fredrique Hammarstedt was a successful celebrity businesswoman, who progressively developed her school to become less of a finishing school and more of a serious educational institution. She was appreciated by the parents of her students for her conservative views, such as her strict adherence to the State Church after the introduction of freedom of religion. In 1855, she married the clergyman Gustaf Hammarstedt, vicar of the Danviken Parish, with whom she had six daughters, but because of their professions, the couple lived in separated residences. However, despite her de facto independent life, she maintained a theoretically conservative world view. An anecdote is known about the contrast between her conservative views and the fact that she lived the life of an independent woman in practice. According to this, she once expressed her dislike of the women's movement, and was contradicted by one of her former students: "And yet, I know of no other woman as emancipated as aunt. [...] Well, to reside in another place than your husband, to continue living there almost the entire marriage and to support yourself and your children by yourself - surely that is rather emancipated!"
