= Helena Eldrup =

Swedish educator

Helena Eldrup (1800 in Karlshamn – 1872 in Gothenburg), was a Swedish educator. She was the first principal of the Kjellbergska flickskolan in Gothenburg from its foundation in 1835 until her death in 1872.

== Life ==
Helena Eldrup was born to the sea captain Gabriel Mollén (d. 1802) and Anna Katarina Remner (d. 1834) and married in Gothenburg in 1821 to sea captain Niels Eldrup (d. 1837), with whom she had a daughter and a son. She lived with her husband in Chile in 1822–27, but separated from him in 1828, lived with her brother John in Great Britain in 1828–29, and returned to Sweden in 1829.

=== Educational career ===
She was for a time employed as a teacher at the Societetsskolan in Gothenburg, before being given the position as principal of the Kjellbergska flickskolan in 1835. The school was founded that same year by a charity board and financed by a will, and she was employed by the board. Essentially, she was given salary and school material from the board, but otherwise entrusted with the foundation and organisation of a pioneer secondary school for girls age 15–16. Helena Eldrup had no formal education, but this was not an obstacle, as there was almost no formal education to be had for a woman at that time. She was estimated by the board to have sufficient informal education for the task, in addition to being an intelligent, religious but compassionate woman as a person.

She succeeded with the task given her by the board, and the first examination for her students was hosted in 1836, upon which she was praised by the school board. Initially, the school was a small one with a moderate number of students, and moved between various addresses until it was finally given a permanent school building in 1870. Helena Eldrup was the only full time teacher for the first seven years, until educated (male) teachers were employed. Eldrup herself remained as English language teacher, speaking the language perfectly. She died in 1872 and was succeeded by Therese Kamph, who expanded and developed the school considerably.

In 1911, 113 former students collected money to commission a portrait of the de facto school founder, Helena Eldrup, made by one of her students, Jenny Nyström.
