= Mazahr Makatemele =

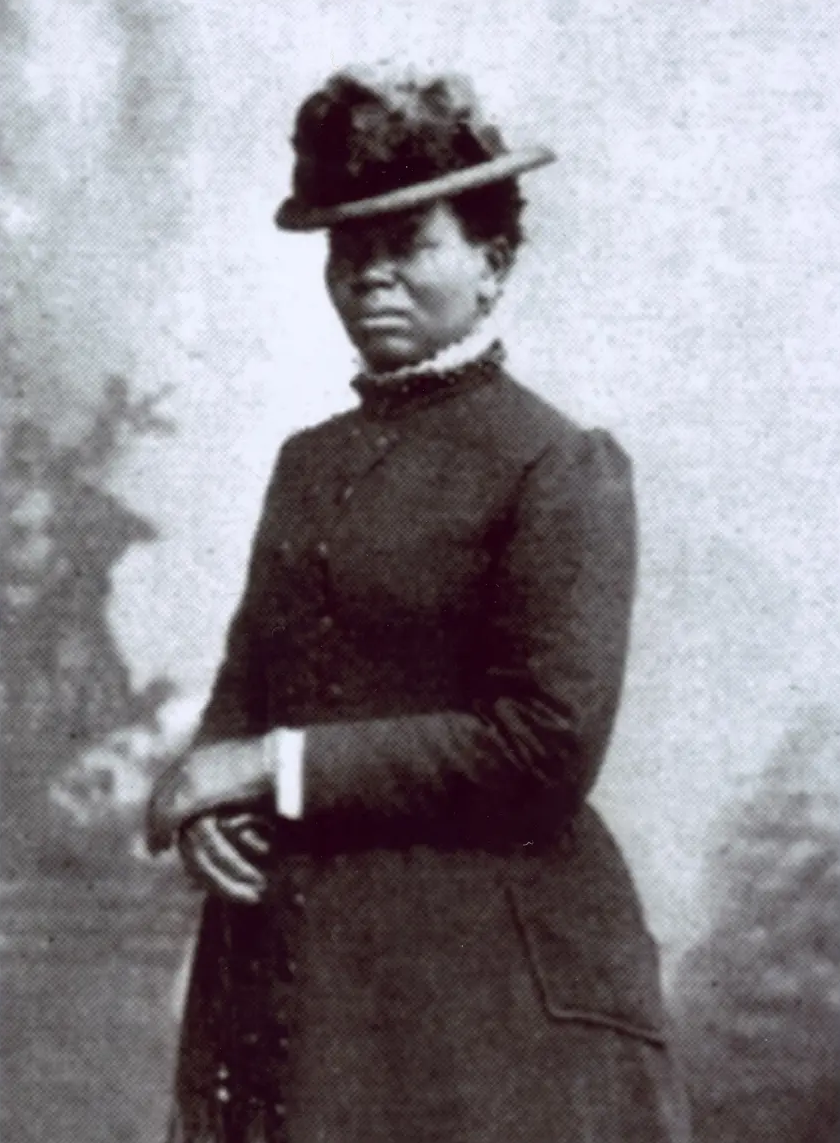
South African woman born Mazahr Makatemele, baptized Sara Magdalena and known as Black Sara. Kalmar, Sweden.

Mazahr Makatemele (c. 1846-1903) was an Afro-Swedish domestic. She was a local profile in the history of Kalmar and is known as one of the first Afro-Swedish women whose life is documented.

She was born in the Colony of Natal, and reportedly belonged to the Tswana- or Sotho people. She was enslaved by the Boers in 1857 or 1858. She eventually became the domestic of the Swedish businessman Alarik Forssman, who was visiting South Africa with his family. She was employed as a free servant and nursemaid by the Forssman family. In 1862, she travelled to Kalmar in Sweden with the Forssman family. She was taken care of by the Swedish Mission Society and converted to Christianity. The conversion attracted attention and gave her good publicity. From 1864, she was employed as a maidservant by Cecilia Fryxell in her girls' school.
