= Single-sex education =

Education conducted with males and females separated

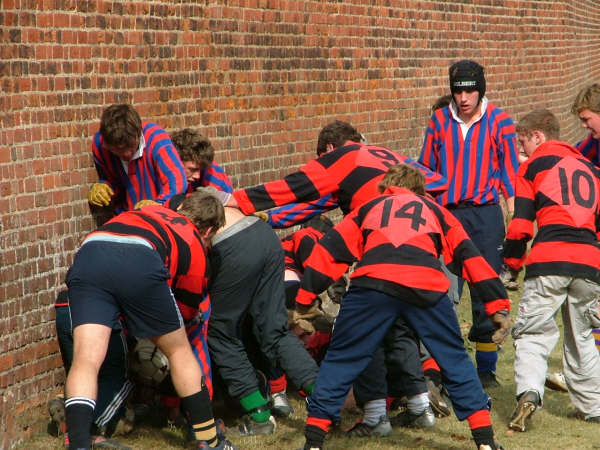
Boy students playing the "Eton wall game" at Eton College, Eton, Berkshire, England.

Single-sex education, also known as single-gender education or gender-specific education, is the practice of conducting education with male and female students attending separate classes, perhaps in separate buildings or schools. More commonly used is the term "all-boys and all-girls schools". The practice of single-sex schooling was common before the 20th century, particularly in secondary and higher education.

Single-sex education is practiced in many parts of the world based on tradition and religion. Single-sex education is most popular in English-speaking countries (regions) such as Singapore, Malaysia, Ireland, the United Kingdom, Hong Kong, South Africa and Australia; also in Chile, Israel, South Korea and in many Muslim majority countries. In the Western world, single-sex education is primarily associated with the private sector, with the public (state) sector being overwhelmingly mixed sex; while in the Muslim world public schools and most private schools are sex-segregated.

Motivations for single-sex education range from religious ideas of sex segregation to beliefs that the sexes learn and behave differently and as such, they thrive in a single-sex environment. In the 19th century, in Western countries, single-sex girls' finishing schools, and women's colleges offered women a chance of education at a time when they were denied access to mainstream educational institutions. The former was especially common in Switzerland, the latter in the U.S. and the U.K., pioneers in women's education.

== History ==
In Western Europe before the 19th century, the most common way for girls to access education was at home, through private tutoring, and not at school, due to the strong resistance to women's involvement in schools. This attitude began to change in the 17th and 18th centuries, when girls' schools were established in both Catholic Europe, where they were managed by nuns, as well as in Protestant Europe, where they were managed by governesses, philanthropists, and private entrepreneurs. The development was similar in the U.S., where early feminists also successfully established women's educational institutions. These were different from and considered inferior to men's institutions. However, they created some of the first opportunities to formalized higher education for women in the Western world. The Seven Sisters colleges offered unprecedented emancipation for women. The pioneer Salem College of Winston-Salem, North Carolina, was founded in 1772, originally as a primary school, later becoming an academy (high school) and finally a college. The New England Female Medical College (1848) and the Woman's Medical College of Pennsylvania (1850) were the first medical institutions in the world established to train women in medicine and offer them the M.D. degree.

During the 19th century, ideas about education started to change: modern ideas that defined education as a right, rather than as a privilege available only to a small elite, started to gain support in North America and Europe. Mass elementary education was introduced, and more and more coeducational schools opened. Together with mass education, coeducation became standard in many places. Increased secularization in the 20th century also contributed to the acceptance of mixed sex education. In 1917 coeducation was mandated in the Soviet Union. According to Cornelius Riordan, "By the end of the nineteenth century, coeducation was all but universal in American elementary and secondary public schools (see Kolesnick, 1969; Bureau of Education, 1883; Butler, 1910; Riordan, 1990). Furthermore, by the end of the 20th century, this was largely true across the world. In the U.K., Australia, and Ireland, the tradition of single-sex education remained quite strong until the 1960s. The 1960s and 1970s were a period of intense social changes. Many anti-discrimination laws were passed during that era, such as the 1972 Title IX. Wiseman (2008) shows that by 2003, only a few countries globally have greater than one or two percent single-sex schools. But there are exceptions where the percent of single-sex schools exceeds 10 percent: Belgium, Chile, Singapore, the United Kingdom, Hong Kong, Israel, New Zealand, Australia, South Korea, and most Muslim nations. Recently, however, there has been a resurgence of interest in single-sex schools in modern societies across the globe, both in the public and private sector (Riordan, 2002)."

== Effects ==
The topic of single-sex education is controversial. Advocates argue that it aids student outcomes such as test scores, graduation rates, and solutions to behavioral difficulties. Opponents, however, argue that evidence for such effects is inflated or non-existent and instead argue that such segregation can increase sexism and impairs the development of interpersonal skills.

Advocates of single-sex education believe that there are persistent sex differences in how males and females learn and behave in educational settings and that such differences merit educating them separately. One version of this argument holds that male-female brain differences favor implementing sex-specific teaching methods, but such claims have not held up to rigorous scrutiny. In addition, supporters of single-sex education argue that by segregating sexes, students do not become distracted by another sex's actions in the classrooms. Supporters of single-sex education also argue that the culture of coeducational settings causes some students to focus more on socialization, rather than prioritizing academics. Single-sex education supporters blame this focus on socialization for causing problems in student participation, attendance levels, and disciplinary problems.

=== US 2005 systematic review and 2008 study ===
A systematic review published in 2005 covering 2221 studies was commissioned by the United States Department of Education entitled Single-Sex Versus Coeducational Schooling: A Systematic Review. The review, which had statistical controls for socio-economic status of the students and resources of the schools, etc., found that in the study on the effects of single-sex schooling:

"The results are equivocal. There is some support for the premise that single-sex schooling can be helpful, especially for certain outcomes related to academic achievement and more positive academic aspirations. For many outcomes, there is no evidence of either benefit or harm. There is limited support for the view that single-sex schooling may be harmful or that coeducational schooling is more beneficial for the student."

"In terms of outcomes that may be of most interest to the primary stakeholders (students and their parents), such as academic achievement, self-concept, and long-term indicators of success, there is a degree of support for [single-sex] schooling."

In general, most studies reported positive effects for single-sex schools on all-subject achievement tests, and the preponderance of studies in areas such as academic accomplishment (both concurrent and long term) and adaptation or socioemotional development (both concurrent and long term) yields results lending support to single-sex schooling.

The quantitative data itself "finds positive results are three to four times more likely to be found for single-sex schools than for coeducational schools in the same study for both academic achievement and socio-emotional development," said Cornelius Riordan, one of the directors of the research.

In 2008, the U.S. government sponsored another study, Early Implementation of Public Single-Sex Schools: Perceptions and Characteristics, which listed the benefits of single-sex schools: (1) Decreases distractions in learning, (2) Reduces student behavior problems, (3) Provides more leadership opportunities, (4) Promotes a sense of community among students and staff, (5) Improves student self-esteem, (6) Addresses unique learning styles and interests of males or females, (7) Decreases sex bias in teacher-student interactions, (8) Improves student achievement, (9) Decreases the academic problems of low achieving students, (10) Reduces sexual harassment among students, (11) Provides more positive student role models, (12) Allows for more opportunities to provide social and moral guidance, (13) Provides choice in public education.

=== Later studies ===
Australian researchers reported in September of 2008 that high school students' interpersonal relationships were positively associated with both academic and nonacademic achievement, although the interaction between boys and girls in a majority of cases resulted in less homework done, less enjoyment of school, and lower reading and mathematics scores.

A UCLA report commissioned by the National Coalition of Girls' Schools used data from an extensive national survey of U.S. college freshmen and found stronger academic orientations among women who had attended all-girls, compared to coeducational high schools, but the effects were minor, and the authors concluded "that the marginal benefits do not justify the potential threats to gender equity brought on by academic sex segregation."

In September 2011, the journal Science published a study deeply critical of gender-segregated schooling, arguing that the movement towards single-sex education "is deeply misguided, and often justified by weak, cherry-picked, or misconstrued scientific claims rather than by valid scientific evidence." The study goes on to conclude that "there is no well-designed research showing that single-sex (SS) education improves students' academic performance, but there is evidence that sex segregation increases gender stereotyping and legitimizes institutional sexism."

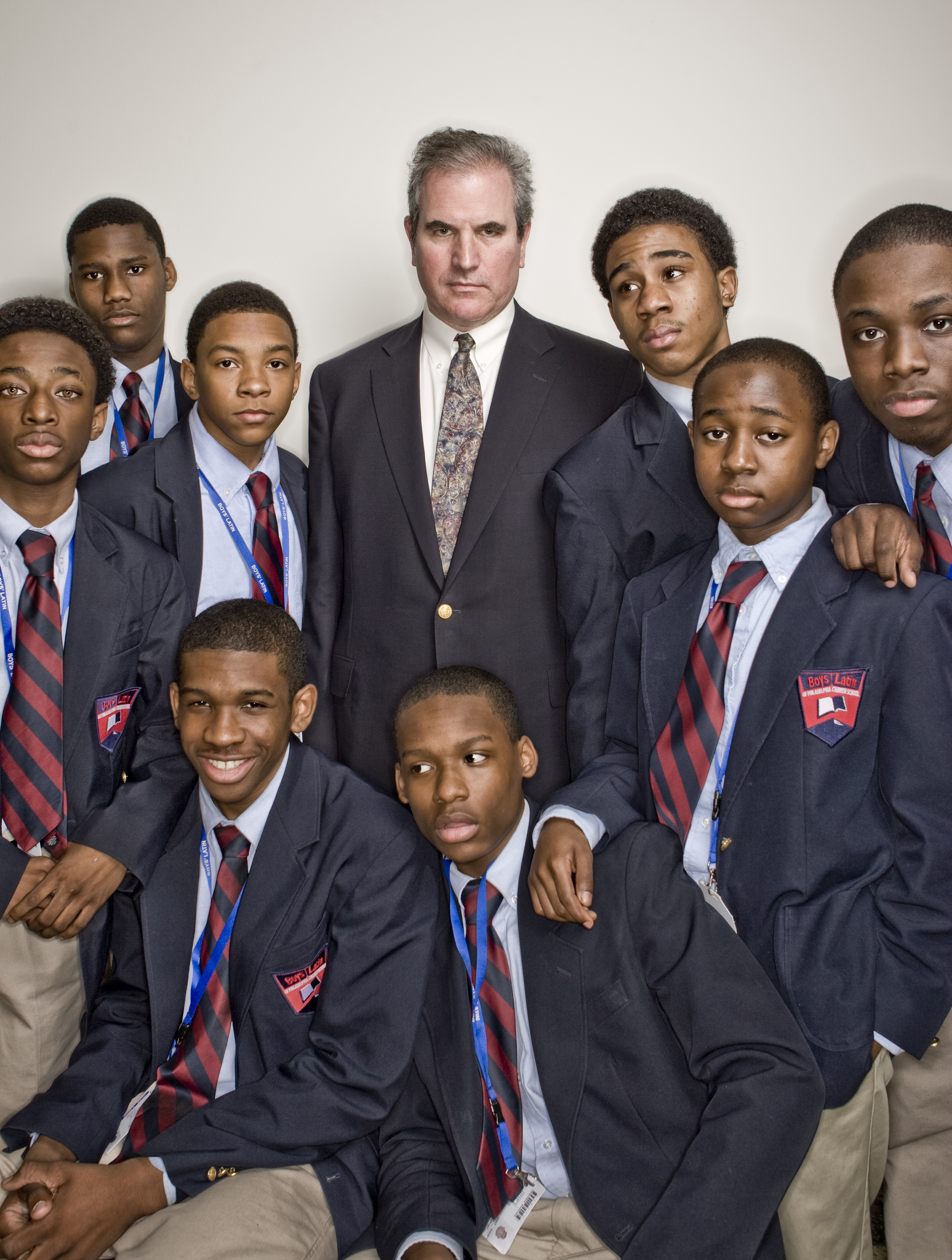
Leonard Sax with high school students in 2009

Leonard Sax, the President of National Association for Single-Sex Public Education or NASSPE, countered the Science article by saying that "ALL the studies cited in the SCIENCE article regarding 'negative impacts' were in fact studies involving a small number of PRE-SCHOOL students attending a COED pre-kindergarten" (capitalized letters in the original). He further said that "these authors provide no evidence for their substantive claim that 'gender divisions are made even more salient in SS settings.' In fact, this conjecture has been tested, and proven false, in multiple studies." Sax cited a study which said that "girls in the all-girls classroom were less aware of 'being a girl' and less aware of gender stereotypes regarding science, compared to girls who were randomly assigned to the coed classroom."

In January 2012, a study of the University of Pennsylvania, involving a randomized experiment, considered the experiment with the highest level of scientific evidence. The data comes from schools in South Korea, where a law was passed randomly assigning students to schools in their district. The study by Park, Berhman, and Choi titled Causal Effects of Single-Sex Schools on College Entrance Exams and College Attendance: Random Assignment in Seoul High Schools concluded that "Attending all-boys schools or all-girls schools rather than attending coeducational schools is significantly associated with higher average scores."

In 2014, E. Pahlke, J. S. Hyde, and C. M. Allison published a meta-analysis in Psychological Bulletin comparing achievement and attitudes in single-sex versus coeducational schools that included 1.6 million students in grades K-12. The study concluded that "there is little evidence of an advantage of SS schooling for girls or boys for any of the outcomes." In a 2015 review of this study, however Cornelius Riordan observed that the authors "employ a 0.2 effect-size threshold in drawing these conclusions about there being no advantage to single-sex schooling. Despite the above conclusion, the research found that, in a separate analysis of just the best studies (well controlled) conducted in America, the effect size in mathematics was 0.14 for both boys and girls. The verbal performance was 0.22 for girls and 0.13 for boys... Educational research has shown that a standard effect size of 0.10 on gains from sophomore to senior year of high school is equivalent to one full year of learning by the average public school student in the United States." Thus, he says, that "Applying this standard, a difference of 0.10 (or greater) between students in single-sex and in coeducational schools would be substantially important." The analysis of the 21 other countries yielded much smaller effects, such as a 0.10 effect on mathematics for girls and a 0.06 effect for boys and science (0.06 for girls and 0.04 for boys). Most of the international effects, then, would fall within Riordan's stricter criterion for statistical significance.

In 2017, Christian Dustmann, Hyejin Ku, Do Won Kwak explained that "While teenage boys may be more likely to be distracted than girls by a mixed-gender school environment (Coleman 1961, Hill 2015), girls may suffer more because of, for instance, an increase in disruptive behaviour (as discussed by Figlio 2007), or a diversion of the teacher's attention to weaker students (as suggested by Lavy et al. 2012).

== By region ==
=== Oceania ===
==== Australia ====
In Australia, most single sex schools are fee paying independent or Catholic schools. There are a small number of single sex government schools, while within the independent sector the proportion of pupils attending single sex schools has dropped from 31% in 1985 to 24% in 1995. Nevertheless, as of 2016 single sex education in Australia is much more popular than in the US. In 2001, after six years of study of more than 270,000 students in 53 academic subjects, the Australian Council for Educational Research showed that boys and girls from single-sex classrooms "scored on average 15 to 22 percentile ranks higher than did boys and girls in coeducational settings. The report also documented that boys and girls in single-sex schools were more likely to be better behaved and to find learning more enjoyable and the curriculum more relevant."

==== New Zealand ====
In New Zealand, almost all primary schools are coeducational (1,935 co-ed, 7 boys-only, 4 girls-only), while there are more examples of single-sex secondary schools. There are 45 boys-only secondary schools, 53 girls-only secondary schools and 274 mixed secondary schools as of July 2018.

During the mid-20th century, several state coeducational secondary schools split into two single-sex schools, with one school moving to a new site, to alleviate overcrowding. These included Hamilton (1955), Gisborne (1956), Hastings (1956), Tauranga (1958), Rotorua (1959), Westlake (1962), Kelston (1963), and Marlborough (1963).

=== South Asia ===
==== Bangladesh ====
In Bangladesh, a large number of government and non-government schools and colleges are single-sex institutions except for the universities. Notably, all Cantonment schools (non-residential schools run directly by Military), Zilla Schools (run directly by Government [First starting in early colonial ages]), Cadet colleges (residential schools run directly by Military) are single-sex schools.

Conservative parents in Bangladesh tend to send their children to single-sex educational institutions.

==== India ====
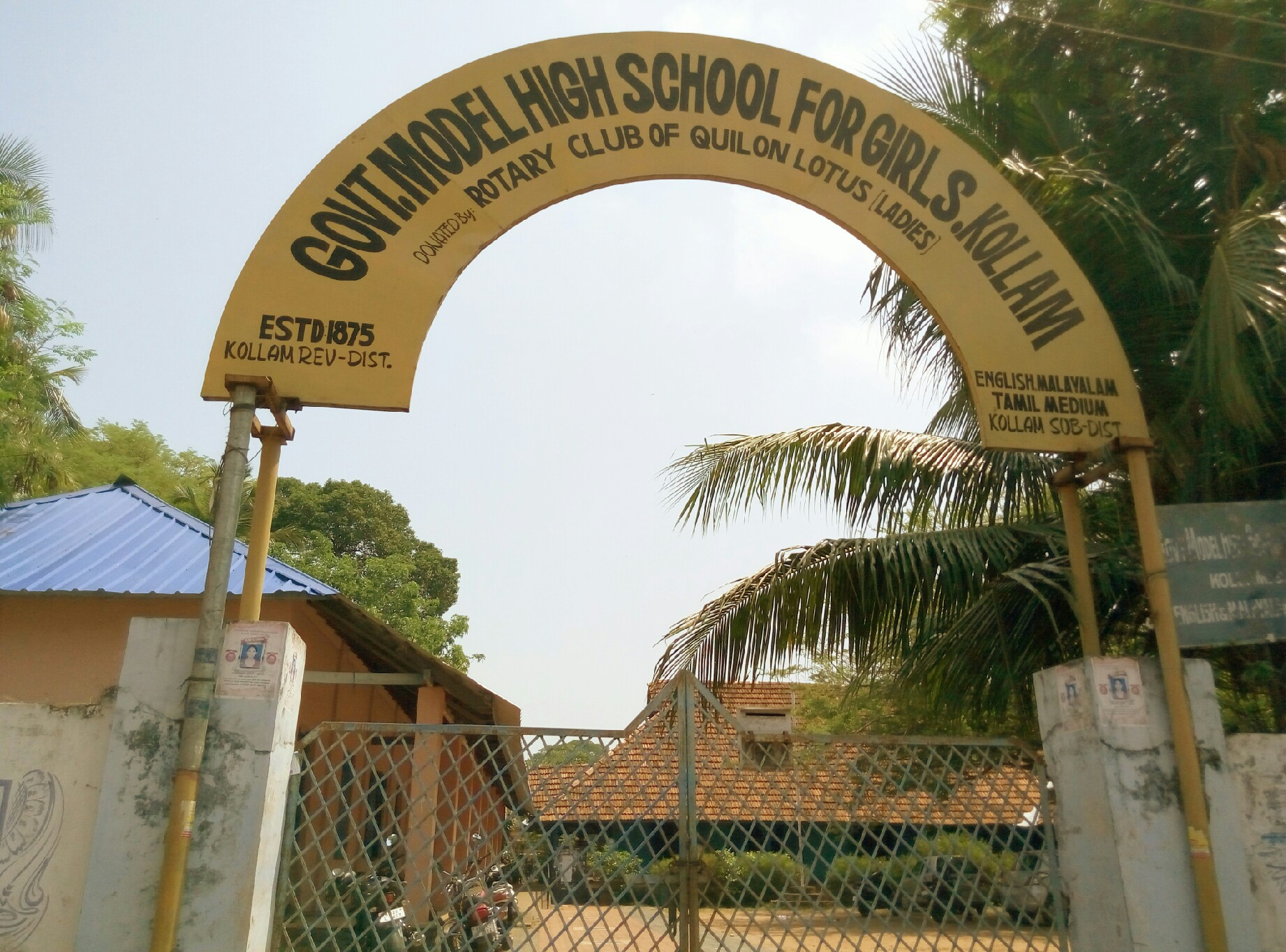
A girls' school entrance in India

Figures indicate that, as of 2002, 53% of girls in the Indian population actually attend schools. Some conservative parents may decide to withdraw their daughters at puberty onset because of fear of distraction. It is also believed that by having single-sex classrooms, the students will be able to focus more on their education, as they will not have the distraction of the other sex. The study argues that coeducation schools provide opportunities for students to interact with their peers, which de-stresses students and creates a friendlier, more relaxed environment.

==== Pakistan ====
The education system in Pakistan is generally divided into six levels: preschool (for the age from 3 to 5 years), primary (grades one through five), middle (grades six through eight), high (grades nine and ten, leading to the Secondary School Certificate or SSC), intermediate (grades eleven and twelve, leading to a Higher Secondary School Certificate or HSSC), and university programs leading to undergraduate and graduate degrees. Most of the private schools in major cities like Karachi, Lahore, Faisalabad, Hyderabad, Islamabad and Rawalpindi have co-education systems but all public schools adhere single-sex education. In some cities, single-sex education is preferred, like Peshawar and Quetta, where many schools are single-sex educational. However, there are also schools in the urban areas which are coeducational. Most colleges are also single-sex education institutions till graduation, but many private and public sector universities have coeducation systems. There are some women's universities in Peshawar and Rawalpindi as well. However, most of the higher education in Pakistan is coeducation.

=== Middle East ===
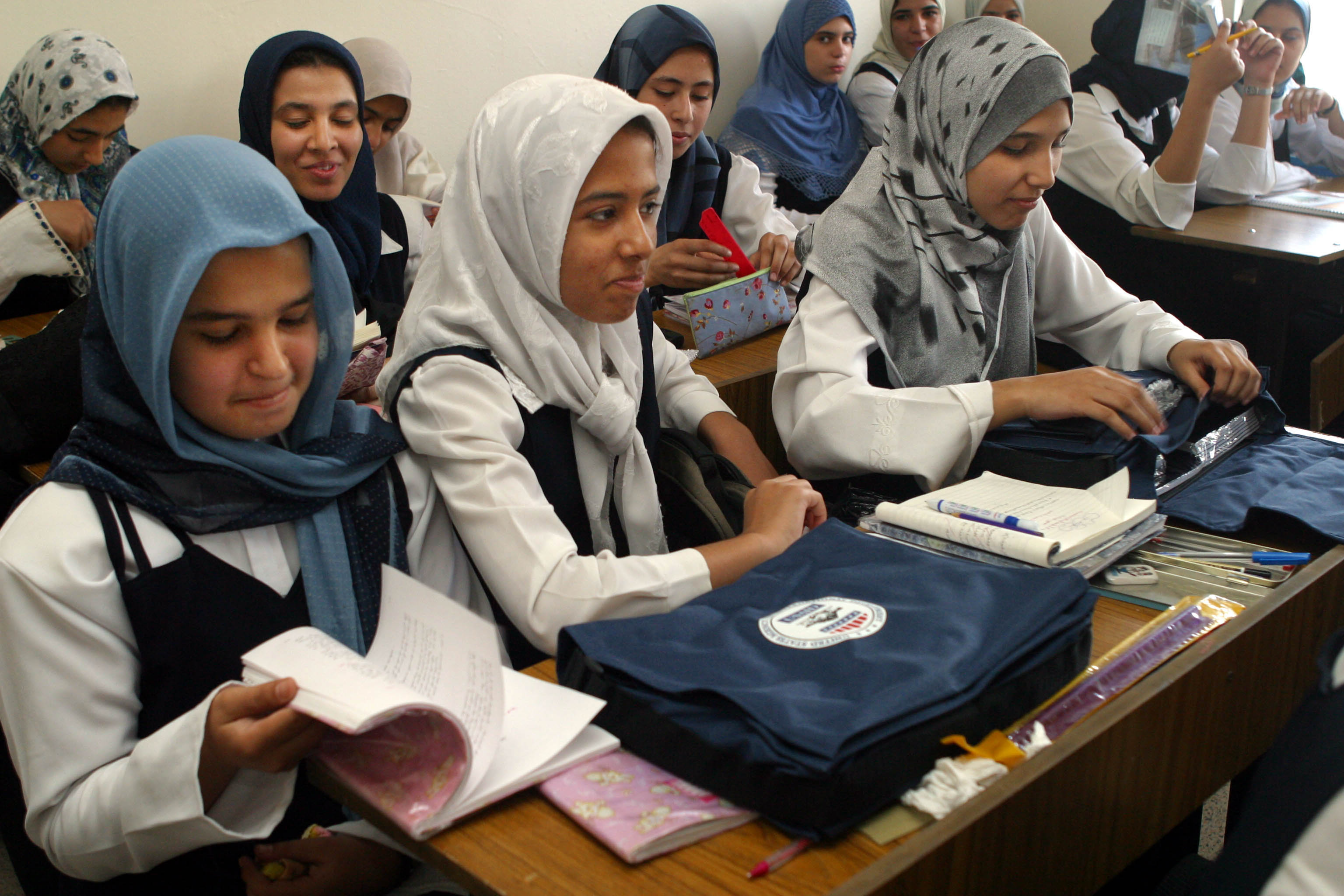
School girls in Iraq

In the Middle East, public schools in several countries are all gender-segregated. In some countries, there are single-sex private schools as well.

==== Iran ====
In Iran, single-sex public and private schools have been in place since the Islamic Revolution. Universities are mostly coeducational in Iran but schools are single-sex. University of Kosar (Bojnourd, Iran) and Narjes Rafsanjan University (Rafsanjan, Iran) are two examples of female-only universities.

==== Israel ====
In Israel, secular public schools are coeducational. Many, but not all, Orthodox public schools are single-sex; the private ultra-Orthodox schools are almost always gender-segregated, usually starting in elementary school.

==== Lebanon ====
In Lebanon, most schools are co-educational schools.

==== Saudi Arabia ====
All schools are sex segregated, there are only boy or girl schools. The first private formal school for girls, the Madrasat AlBanat AlAhliah, was established in 1941.

==== Syria ====
In Syria, private schools are coeducational, while public schools are mostly, but not exclusively, segregated (only in the middle and high schools, while mostly all the primary schools are coeducational). Universities are all coeducational.

==== United Arab Emirates ====
Private schools are coeducational in all Emirates but Sharjah, where segregated sex schooling is mandated for those grade 4 and above.

=== West Africa ===
==== Nigeria ====
In Nigeria, public opinion regarding sexes in schools is influenced most by religious and cultural beliefs rather than the idea that students learn better separated into sexes. Because of this, the attitude towards the separation/integration of sexes varies depending on the ethnic makeup of the region. People in northern Nigeria are primarily Muslim and, as a result, are more inclined to choose single-sex education over coeducation in line with their religious beliefs. However, country-wide, coeducation schools are more common than single-sex schools.

In contrast to the predominance of coeducation schools, many prestigious educational institutions only accept one sex; notable examples include King's College and Queen's College situated in Lagos. Although the sexes are not separated in the classroom at the university level, it is common practice to employ a single-sex housing policy on university campuses, e.g., Covenant University.

=== Western Europe ===
==== France ====
As was customary in Catholic countries in Europe, girls were educated in convent schools for girls operated by nuns, such as Abbaye de Penthemont in Paris. A rare exception was Maison royale de Saint-Louis, founded by Madame de Maintenon in 1684. After the French Revolution, it became more common with girls' schools, often operated by governesses, a famous pioneer school being Jeanne-Louise-Henriette Campan.

France formally included girls in the state elementary education school system in 1836, but girls and boys were only integrated into the lower levels, while the secondary education of girls was entrusted to girls' schools managed by either nuns or governesses, both of whom lacked the necessary qualifications. When women were formally allowed to attend university in France in 1861, it was hard for them to qualify because of the bad quality of the secondary education. When the problem of unqualified female teachers in the girls' secondary education was addressed by a state teacher's seminary for women and state secondary education for girls, both of these were still gender-segregated. The French school system was not desegregated on the middle secondary education level until the 20th century.

==== Germany ====
Germany was a pioneer in the education of girls. Beginning in the 17th-century, schools for girls opened in both Roman Catholic Southern Germany and Protestant Northern Germany. In Catholic Germany, the Catholic Ursuline and Elisabeth sisters established first elementary education schools for poor children and orphans and eventually (before 1750), also a type of secondary education girls' schools for wealthy girls called "daughters institutes", which were essentially finishing schools. In Protestant Germany, the great Pietist school innovator August Hermann Francke of Halle founded Gynaeceum, the first girls school or 'Mädchenschule' in 1698. The Gynaeceum was followed by many Pietist girls' schools in Germany, notably the Magdalenenstift in Altenburg and Johann Julius Hecker's Royal Elisabeth School in Berlin in 1747.

In the 18th-century, it became common with so-called Töchterschule ('daughter school') in German cities, supported by the merchant class who wished for their daughters to be given elementary schooling, as well as girls schools known as Mädchenpensionat, essentially finishing schools for upper-class daughters. In the early 19th-century, secondary education girls schools known as höhere Töchterschule ('Higher Daughter school') became common: these schools were given government support and became public in many German cities in the second half of the 19th century and their education adjusted to become equivalents of the secondary education boys' schools. In 1908, women were allowed to attend university, and in the 20th century, the public secondary education system was integrated.

==== Ireland ====
Ireland has significantly more pupils studying in single-sex schools than other western countries: more than one-third of second-level schools are single-sex. Single-sex education is less common at the primary level than at the secondary level: 17% of primary school children attend single-sex schools.

==== Sweden ====
Around 1800, girls' middle-secondary schools began to appear, and become more common during the 19th century. By the mid-1970s, most of them had been scrapped and replaced with coeducation.

By law from the 1570s (Swedish Church Ordinance 1571), girls, as well as boys, were expected to be given elementary schooling. The establishment for girls' schools was left to each city's authorities, and no school for girls was founded until the Rudbeckii flickskola in 1632, and that school was an isolated example. However, schools for boys did accept female students at the lowest levels and occasionally even at high levels: Ursula Agricola and Maria Jonae Palmgren were accepted at Visingsö Gymnasium in 1644 and 1645 respectively, and Aurora Liljenroth graduated from the same school in 1788.

During the 18th century, many girls' schools were established, referred to as Mamsellskola ('Mamsell school') or Franskpension ('French pension'). These schools could normally be classified as finishing schools, with only a shallow education of polite conversation in French, embroidery, piano playing, and other accomplishments, and the purpose was only to give the students a proper minimum education to be a lady, a wife, and a mother.

In the first half of the 19th century, growing discontent over the shallow education of women eventually resulted in the finishing schools being gradually replaced by girls' schools with a higher level of academic secondary education, called "Higher Girl Schools", in the mid-19th century. At the time of the introduction of the compulsory elementary school for both sexes in Sweden in 1842, only five schools in Sweden provided academic secondary education to females: the Societetsskolan (1786), Fruntimmersföreningens flickskola (1815) and Kjellbergska flickskolan (1833) in Gothenburg, Askersunds flickskola (1812) in Askersund, and Wallinska skolan (1831) in Stockholm.

During the second half of the 19th century, secondary education girl schools were in most Swedish cities. All of these were private, except the women's college Högre lärarinneseminariet in Stockholm from 1861, and its adjacent girls' school Statens normalskola för flickor. The Girls' School Committee of 1866 organized the regulation of girls' schools and female education in Sweden: from 1870, some girls' schools were given the right to offer the gymnasium (school) level to their students, and from 1874, those girls' schools which met the demands were given governmental support, and some were given the right to administer the school-leaving exam. This was necessary to make it possible for women to enroll at the universities, which had been opened to women in 1870, as female students were not accepted in the same middle schools as male students.

Between 1904 and 1909, girls were integrated with state boys' schools on the secondary levels, making it possible for girls to complete their elementary- and middle-level education in a state school instead of going to an expensive private girls' school. Finally, in 1927, all state secondary schools for boys were integrated, and the private girls' schools started to be transformed into coeducational schools, a process which was completed by 1970.

==== United Kingdom ====
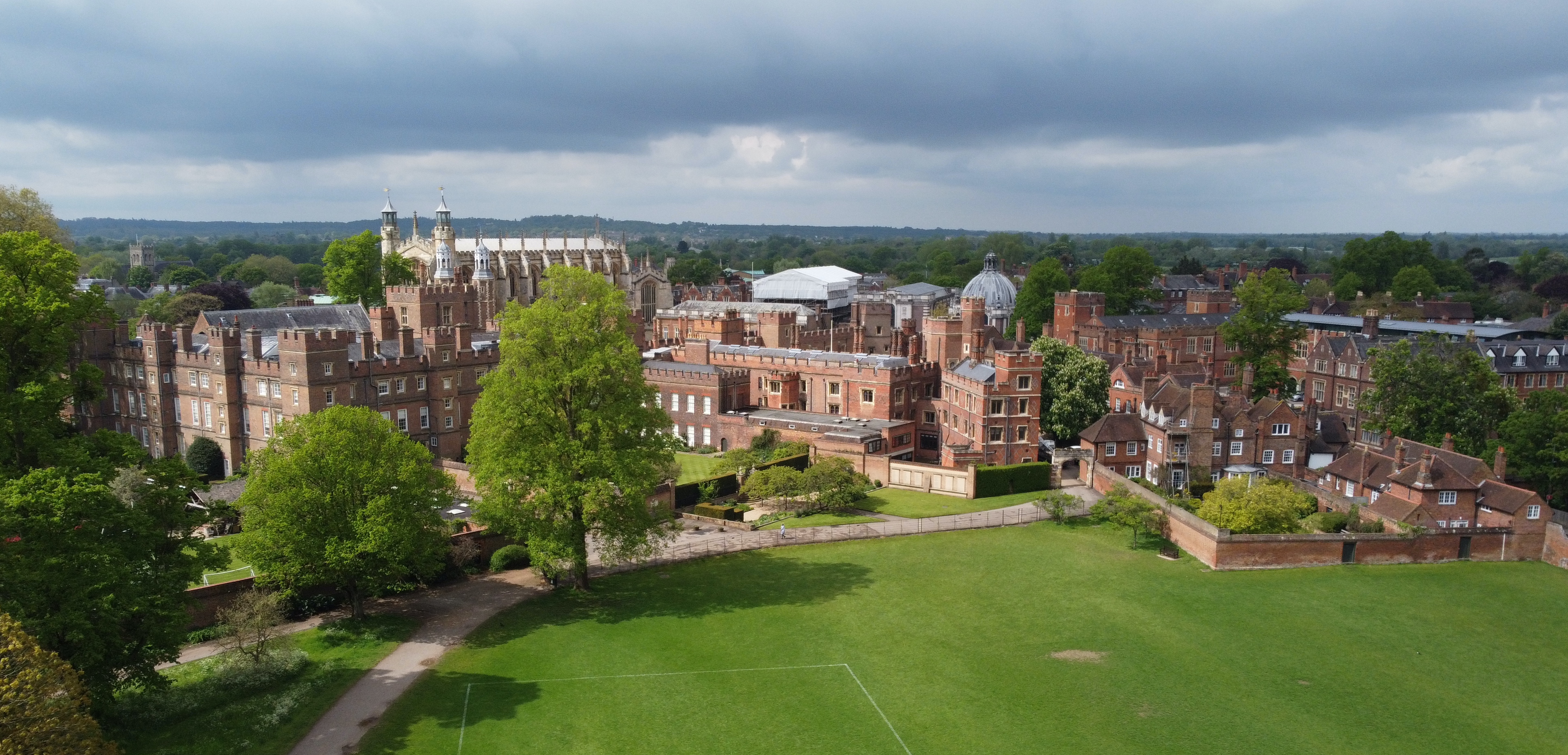
Eton College, a prestigious English independent school for boys

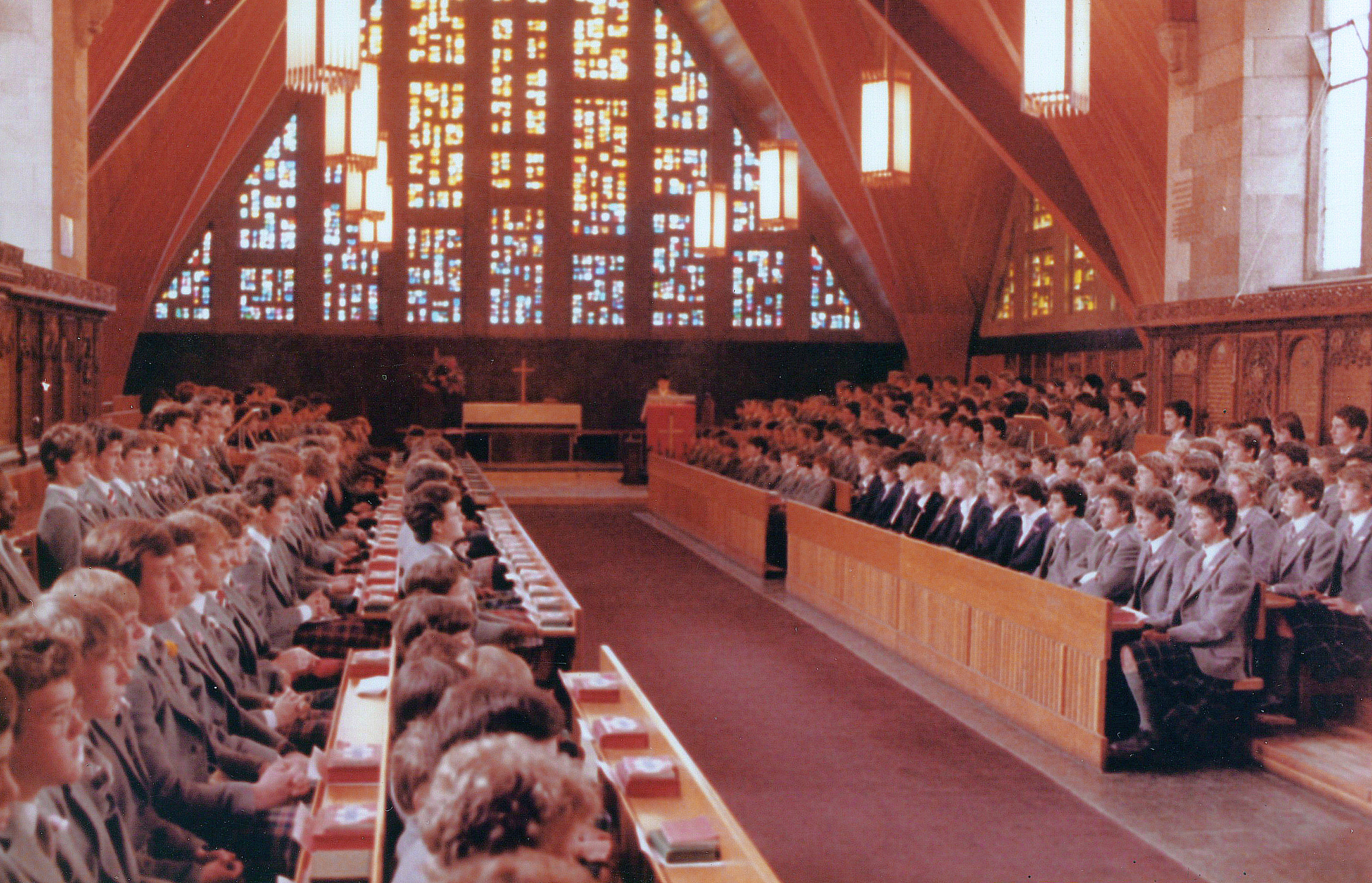
All-boy students of Loretto School, Scotland

While England has a very strong tradition of single-sex education, education in Scotland was largely mixed, and Wales introduced dual schools (a girls' side and a boys' side under one roof) in 1889. In England, most secondary education was single-sex until the 1970s.

Single-sex schooling was traditionally the norm for secondary schools in most parts of the United Kingdom, especially for private, grammar and secondary modern schools, but most UK schools are now coeducational. In the state sector of the U.K. education system very few single sex schools remain. The number of single-sex state schools has fallen from nearly 2,500 to just over 400 in 40 years. According to Alan Smithers, Professor of Education at Buckingham University, there was no evidence that single-sex schools were consistently superior.

A major longitudinal study of over 17,000 individuals examined whether single-sex schooling made a difference for a wide range of outcomes, including academic attainment, earnings, marriage, childbearing and divorce. The authors found that girls fared better in examinations at age 16 at single-sex schools, while boys achieved similar results at single-sex or co-educational schools.

Girls rated their abilities in maths and sciences higher if they went to a girls' school, and boys rated their abilities in English higher if they went to a boys' school, i.e. gender stereotyping was weaker in the single-sex sector. Later in life, women who had been to single-sex schools went on to earn higher wages than women who had been to co-educational schools.

=== North America ===
==== Canada ====
Many single-sex schools exist in Canada, particularly Roman Catholic separate schools. Examples in the City of Toronto include: Notre Dame High School, Neil McNeil High School, Chaminade College School, St. Joseph's Morrow Park Catholic Secondary School, Madonna Catholic Secondary School, Brebeuf College School, St. Joseph's College School, Michael Power High School, St. Joseph's High School, Islington, St. Andrew's College, St. Michael's College School, Upper Canada College, Havergal College, Royal St. George's College and Loretto College School.

==== United States ====
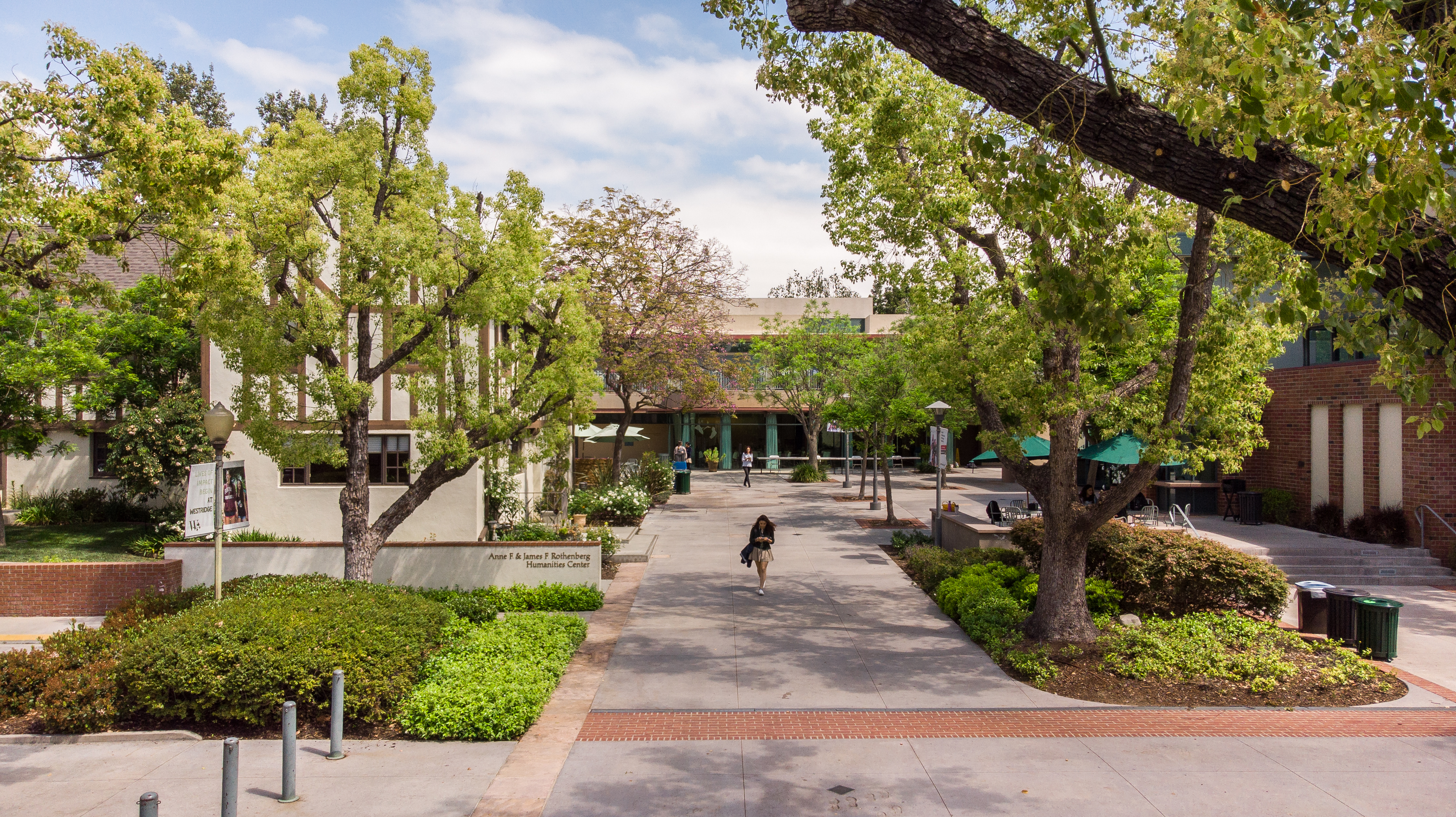
Foreman Courtyard on Westridge campus in Pasadena, California

Until the 19th century, single-sex education was the norm in the United States, although this varied by region. In New England, there was more mixed-sex education than in the South, and girls in New England had more access to education in general. Mixed-sex education started to spread rapidly with the generalization of elementary education in the 19th century. According to Cornelius Riordan, "By the end of the nineteenth century, coeducation was all but universal in American elementary and secondary public schools (see Kolesnick, 1969; Bureau of Education, 1883; Butler, 1910; Riordan, 1990). However, higher education was usually single-sex, and men's colleges and women's colleges were common well into the 20th century. A form of education strongly associated with sex-segregation is Catholic schools, although many Catholic schools today are coeducational. The idea of educating students differently by sex, formally or informally, was common until the 1970s.

A controversy regarding single-sex education in the United States is its association with racist ideologies in the 1950s in the American South. After the Brown v. Board of Education (1954) ruled racial segregation in education unconstitutional, therefore paving the way to educating together black and white children, many conservatives reacted very negatively to the idea of black boys and white girls socializing together, potentially leading to interracial romantic couples. As such, segregation by sex in schools became quite common during that era across the Southern US, with many single-sex educational institutions being established.

A major event that affected single-sex schooling in the US was when the Title IX amendments of the Education Amendments of 1972 were passed. The Encyclopedia of Women and Gender explains Title IX as being "Founded on the premises of equal opportunity, equal access, and full integration, it focused on providing complete access to participation in all functions of schooling, regardless of gender" (Sex Segregation in Education, 2001). Many feminists fought for the passage of this law. The goal was to ban all sex discrimination in any education program which received financial aid from the government. It was stated specifically on the Department of Education website as, "No person in the US, on the basis of sex, can be excluded from the participation in, be denied the benefits of, or be subjected to discrimination under any education program or activity receiving Federal financial assistance".

The leading cause which led to the start of more public schools having single-sex classes or entire schools was when the reforms to the Title IX of the Education Amendments of 1972 were passed in 2006. Initially, Title IX had allowed the separation of males and females in certain areas in school before the new changes. For example, they were allowed to have single-gender classes for physical education when contact sports were involved and sex-education classes. Kasic (2008) indicates that the new regulations allow nonvocational public schools to receive funding if they offer single-sex classes or entire single-sex schools, but to start these programs, they have to have a governmental or educational objective. These programs must also be voluntary, so public schools cannot be required to offer these single-sex programs. If they do, they cannot force students to participate in them. Diana Schemo explains in a New York Times article, "Until now, public school districts that offered a school to one sex generally had to provide a comparable school for students of the other sex. However, the new rules say districts can offer such students the option to attend comparable coeducational schools" (Schemo, 2006, p. 2). Since these regulations were approved, the number of public schools offering single-sex programs has been steadily increasing because the rules are more flexible.

In the United States, the Supreme Court ruled on the constitutionality of single-sex public education in the 1996 case of United States v. Virginia. This ruling, written by Justice Ruth Bader Ginsburg, concluded that single-sex education in the public sector is constitutional only if comparable courses, services, and facilities are made available to both sexes. The No Child Left Behind Act contains provisions (sections 5131.a.23. and 5131c, 20 U.S.C. section 7215(a)(23), and section 7215(c)) designed by their authors—senators Hillary Clinton (D-NY) and Kay Bailey Hutchison (R-TX)—to facilitate single-sex education in public schools. These provisions led to the publication of new federal rules in October 2006 to allow districts to create single-sex schools and classes provided that 1) enrollment is voluntary and 2) comparable courses, services, and facilities are available to both sexes. The number of public schools offering single-sex classrooms rose from 4 in 1998 to 540 in 2010, according to the web site of the National Association for Single Sex Public Education.

Education Next and the Program on Education Policy and Governance at Harvard University sponsored a nationwide survey conducted by Knowledge Networks in early 2008. According to the survey, "more than one-third of Americans feel parents should have the option of sending their child to a single-sex school".

==== Gender segregation in American history ====
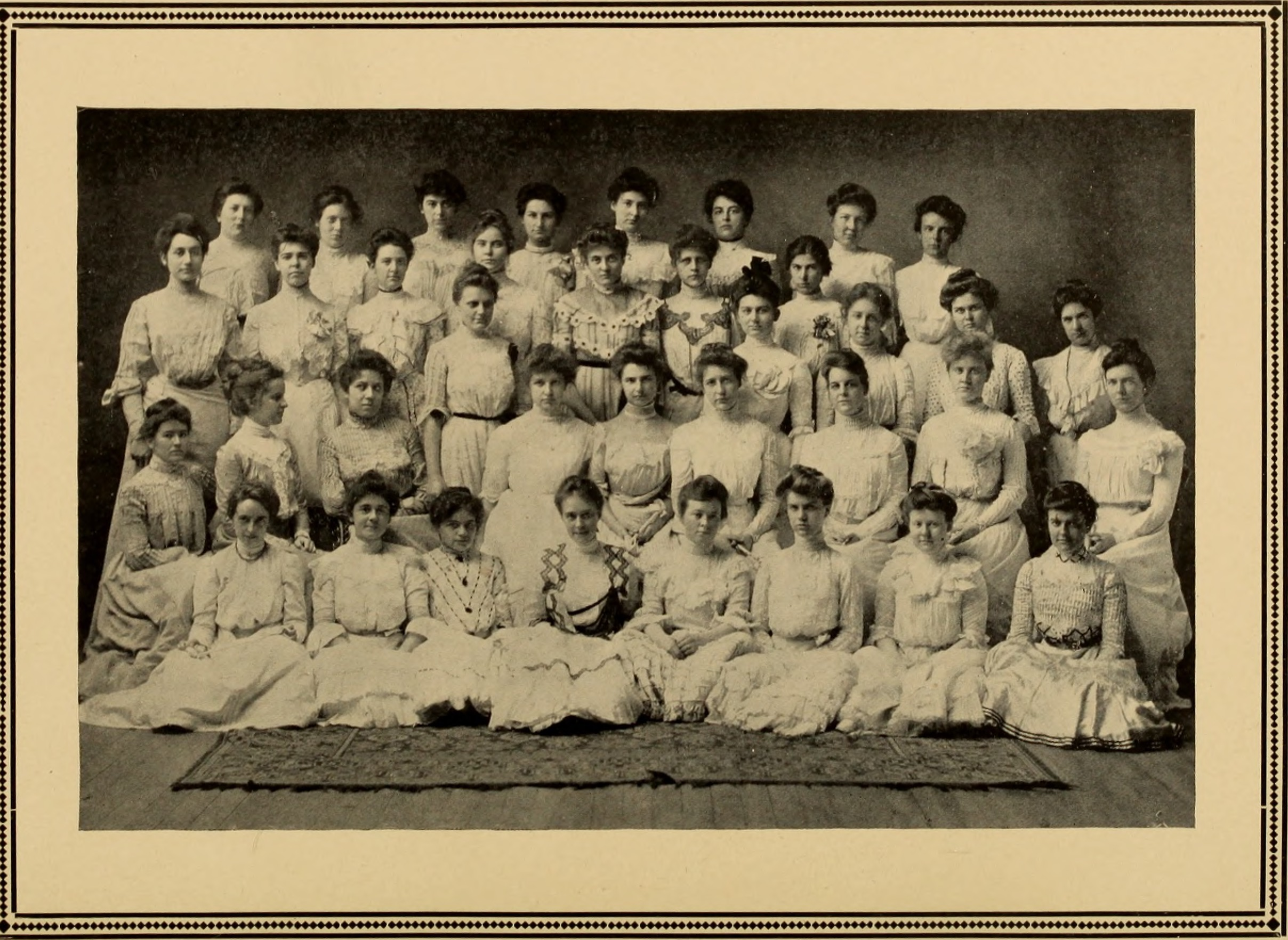
Smith College, class of 1902

In the United States, gender segregation in schools was initially a product of an era when traditional gender roles categorically determined scholastic, professional, and social opportunities based on sex. For instance, leading experts supported gender segregation in higher education because they considered it "to be dangerous and inappropriate for women. Experts claimed that scientific evidence established that women were physically and temperamentally not suited to the rigors of the academy . ... Separate education for men and women paralleled the separate spheres that each was expected to occupy." Furthermore, colleges and universities did not consider female applicants until the second half of the nineteenth century, when the women's rights movement began advocating for gender equality. In response to social progression, "at the turn of the twentieth century, educators, particularly those in the South, fiercely resisted coeducation in elite all-male colleges, and most of the Ivy League institutions would drag their feet well into the twentieth century before becoming coeducational."

== See also ==
- Men's colleges
- Women's colleges
- Lists of boys' schools
- Lists of girls' schools
- Mixed-sex education

== Other readings ==
- Single-sex Schools for Girls and Gender Equality, UNESCO Brief, 2007
- Single sex environments and gender differences in risk aversion
