= Ebba Ramsay =

Swedish social worker, writer and translator

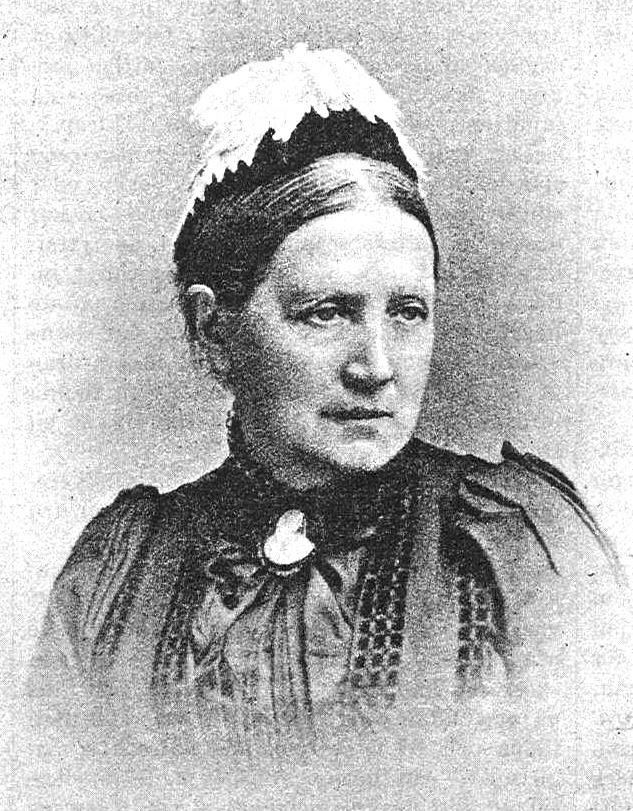
- Ramsay, circa 1895
- Born: Ebba Gustava Karström; 1 October 1828; Saint Nicholas parish, Stockholm County, Sweden
- Died: 29 October 1922 (aged 94); Jönköpings Sofia parish, Jönköping County, Sweden
- Occupation(s): Social worker, writer, and translator

Ebba Ramsay (1 October 1828 – 29 October 1922) was a Swedish social worker, writer, and translator. She was among the first Sunday school teachers in Sweden and created the first institution in the country devoted to the care of mentally and physically challenged children. She is remembered for her work that stressed the importance of providing adequate care for children with disabilities at a time when their needs were typically ignored.

== Early life and education ==
Ebba Gustava Karström was born on 1 October 1828, in Saint Nicholas parish, Stockholm County, Sweden, to Carolina Catharina (née Almqvist) and Wilhelm Svedin Karström. Her father was the district customs manager of Stockholm. Her family was very pious and from a young age, she was dedicated to activities that could provide emotional support and relief from distress. She was educated at the Hammarstedtska skolan run by Augusta Bjurström and studied music and languages with Adolf Fredrik Lindblad. She became proficient enough in English, French, Gaelic, and German, that she would later translate works from these languages. She also studied drawing and painting and began to produce watercolor paintings. Involved in the intra-church revival movement, she along with friends Betty Ehrenborg and Mathilda Foy established one of the first Sunday schools in the capital in the 1840s.

== Career ==
The family moved to Gothenburg in 1847, and Karström began to work as secretary for a single mothers' association. Through her work there, she became aware of the needs of the mothers in caring for their sick or disabled children. She established the first Sunday school in Gothenburg, and from about 1850, she began work with children who had chronic illnesses or disabilities. In 1854, she went to England and Scotland to study social work practices for several months. She was strongly influenced by the work of the brothers Andrew and Horatius Bonar, Alexander Duff, and George Miller, who combined their missionary work with social improvement programs. Upon her return to Sweden and began to implement methods she had learned abroad into programs to provide care for the poor, as well as children and youth. She also wrote her first original publication that year, Sanning och dikt: pennritningar från Skärgården (Truth and Poetry: Pencil Drawings from the Archipelago), a book of religiously themed poems. She had published translations beginning in 1852 with a two-volume work based on Catherine Maria Sedgwick's 700-page book analyzing the benefits of whether or not to marry. (However, Johanna McElwee, Senior Lecturer/Associate Professor in the Department of Scandinavian Languages at Uppsala University, has suggested that the 1852 work translated by Ramsay might in fact have been by another anonymous author, with a similar title to Sedgwick's 1857 novel.)

On 4 December 1856, in Gothenburg, Karström married Carl Magnus Ramsay, a native of Finland. He was a civil servant and worked as a captain in the Road and Waterway Construction Service Corps. The couple had a daughter, Helen Ebba Sofia Ramsey, in 1859, who would grow up to become headmistress of the epileptic institution at Vilhelmsro. The following year, the family moved to Jönköping, where Ramsey would continue her missionary and social work. She founded a small preschool in 1862, and continued to publish poetry and religious works, signing them as E. R–y. After the unexpected death of her husband in 1864, Ramsay returned to Gothenburg. In 1865, she founded a home for orphans and chronically ill children. Within two years, she had formed an association among wealthy patrons to support the work with children. The association began hosting mother's meetings providing lectures and spiritual uplift. During the meetings, the women would distribute milk and bread and host sewing workshops to repair and mend clothing to assist poor families. From 1869, she began to organize summer camps for children on the Gothenburg archipelago, catering to those with tuberculosis or scrofula, and disabilities. The goal was to improve their health through outdoor activities and by removing them from the wretched conditions found in many poor homes.

From 1870, Ramsay was more dedicated to her writing, producing around 100 translations, articles, and pamphlets for newspapers and women's magazines on a broad range of topics including children's health, epilepsy, religious enlightenment, social projects, and temperance. In 1872, Ramsay's father purchased a farm on Lake Vättern north of Jönköping for her. She named it Vilhelmsro (or Wilhelmsro) in his honor. Within two years, she opened a home there for children with physical and mental challenges, which became the first institution in Sweden dedicated to physically and mentally challenged children. Starting with only six children, within a year, Ramsay was caring for twenty youths. Seeking help from philanthropists, benefactors in England helped her build an asylum on the site which she called "Hoppet", allowing her to support 200 children. In 1879, she formed an association with Princess Eugénie to provide for the care of poor, terminally ill, and orphaned children in Stockholm. Until the Eugenia Home was built in 1880 to provide housing for the children, they temporarily resided with Ramsay at Hoppet.

Ramsay continued to make study trips abroad and became involved in the temperance movement because of her many stays in seaside towns, where she came into contact with the habits of sailors. She distributed Bibles and book bags to departing ships in an effort to encourage better habits among them. During a trip to the south of France, she visited the Asiles de La Force in Dordogne to study children who were both epileptic and mentally challenged. Although she returned to Sweden intent on helping epileptic children, as there were no such facilities in the country, Ramsay was unable to begin that work until 1889. At that time, her daughter became head of the institution and its focus prioritized the care of children with epilepsy. Only able to care for a fraction of the children who needed care, Ramsay advocated for facilities to be built in the country. A facility was opened in the Mariehäll district Stockholm and another in Gothenburg. She also stressed the need for care of children who were blind, deaf, and mute.

== Death and legacy ==
Ramsey died on 29 October 1922 in Jönköpings Sofia parish, in Jönköping County. She is remembered as a prolific writer, but moreso for her pioneering efforts to establish care facilities for children with mental and physical disabilities at a time when Sweden was not focused on such children.

== Selected works ==
- Sedgwick, Catharine Maria (1852–1853). Gift och ogift: eller ännu några sanna skildringar ur det husliga lifvet [Married and Single: Or Some More True Accounts of Domestic Life] (in Swedish). Vol. 1 & 2. Translated by R–y, E. Gefle: Forssell. OCLC 936489822.
- R–y, E. (1854). Sanning och dikt: pennritningar från Skärgården [Truth and Poetry: Pencil Drawings from the Archipelago] (in Swedish). Stockholm: Bonnier. OCLC 1257270577.
- R–y, E. (1870). Fågelboet eller barnens verksamhet vid barnhemmen [The Bird's Nest or Children's Activities at Orphanages] (in Swedish). Stockholm: Normans Förlag. OCLC 677102840.
- R–y, E. (1871). Om symötesföreningar i Göteborg [About Sewing Associations in Gothenburg] (in Swedish). Gothenburg: n.s. OCLC 677106022.
- R–y, E. (1894). Om Wilhelmsrokolonien för barn [About Wilhelmsro Colony for Children] (in Swedish). Jönköping: n.s. OCLC 186296958.
- R–y, E. (1902). 'Tag och läs!': Augustini lif ['Take and Read!': The Life of Augustini] (in Swedish). Jönköping: n.s. OCLC 186296997.
- Ramsay, Ebba Gustava (1919). Från mina barndomsdagar, 1828–1845 [From My Childhood Days 1828–1845] (in Swedish). Stockholm: Norstedt. OCLC 15687646.
