= Fruntimmersföreningens flickskola =

Fruntimmerföreningens flickskola ('Women's Society's Girls' School'), was a Girls' School in Gothenburg in Sweden which was active between 1815 and 1938. At the time of the introduction of compulsory elementary schools in Sweden in 1842, it was one of five schools in Sweden to provide academic secondary education to females: the others being Societetsskolan (1786) and Kjellbergska flickskolan (1833) in Gothenburg, Askersunds flickskola (1812) in Askersund and Wallinska skolan (1831) in Stockholm.

== History ==
The school was founded by the Association af Fruntimmer ('Women's Society'), a women's charitable society headed by Betty Scott, Marie Lamberg and Lovisa Lamberg, which continued to function as managing directors of the school. The society was founded out of concern for poor women, as the Swedish economy was by that time seriously damaged by the Napoleonic Wars.

=== Activity ===
The stated purpose of the school was to provide education to make it possible for females from the poor but educated class to support themselves professionally. This separated the school from most other contemporary girls' schools, which had the purpose to educate their students as ideal wives and mothers, and it was thereby a part of the wave of a new type of girls' schools, which was established in Sweden in the mid-19th century in response to a contemporary Swedish debate about women's education. Furthermore, Fruntimmersföreningens flickskola accepted students free of charge, which made it possible to accept just the kind of student which answered to the description of a female who would be likely to need to support herself, normally from the middle classes. The school lived mainly on donations and the fees of the members of the women's society. Queen Desideria was the official protector of the school from 1824 to 1860. From 1876, it was also provided with government support in accordance with the Girls' School Committee of 1866.

The subjects were Swedish, history, geography, Christianity and gymnastics: from 1869 expanded to include German, English, mathematics, nature science, writing, drawing, singing, handicrafts, bookkeeping, dressmaking and house economics.

=== Dissolution ===
On 3 February 1938, by a decision of the city council, four of the girls' schools in Gothenburg: Fruntimmersföreningens flickskola from 1815, Mathilda Halls skola (Mathilda Hall's School) from 1857, Vasa flickskola (Vasa Girls' School) from 1914, and Göteborgs Lyceum för flickor (Gothenburg Lyceum for Girls) from 1917, were united into a communal girls' school named "Vasa kommunala flickskola" (Vasa Communal Girls' School).

== Other sources ==
- Göteborgs Kalender för 1870, Handelstidningens Bolags Tryckeri, Göteborg 1870 s. 103
- Göteborg : Skisserade skildringar af Sveriges andra stad i våra dagar, jämte en återblick på dess minnen för såväl turister som hemmavarande efter tryckta och otryckta källor, [Med en karta öfver Göteborg], Albert Cederblad, D. F. Bonniers Förlagsexpedition, Göteborg 1884 s. 78
- Kronologiska anteckningar om viktigare händelser i Göteborg 1619–1982, Agne Rundqvist, Ralf Scander, Anders Bothén, Elof Lindälv, utgiven av Göteborgs hembygdsförbund 1982 s. 65, 101
- Fruntimmersföreningens flickskola i Nordisk familjebok (andra upplagans supplement, 1923)
- Göteborgs folkskolor 1858–1958, Olof Em. Olsson, Göteborgs allmänna skolstyrelse 1958 s. 29f
- Marianne Johansson.En studie av synen på kvinnor och högre utbildning. I samband med läroverksreformen 1927
