= Therese Kamph =

Swedish educator

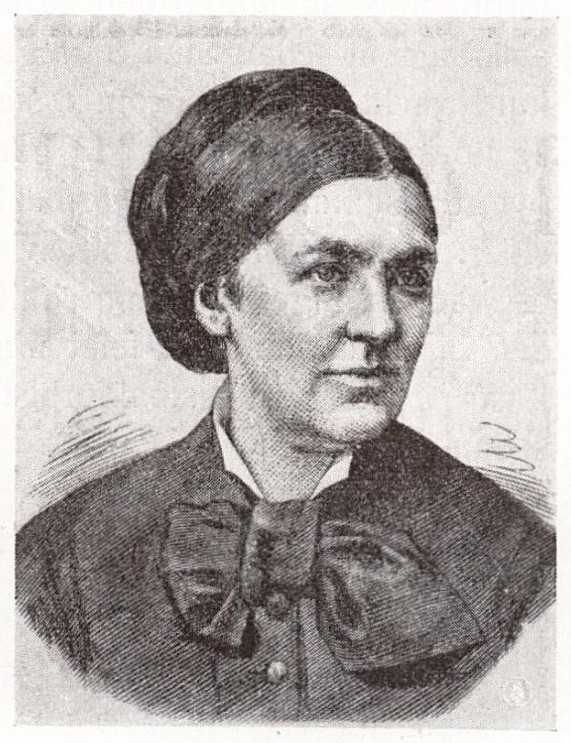
Therese Kamph.

Therese Kamph (1836–1884), was a Swedish educator. She was the principal of the Kjellbergska flickskolan in Gothenburg from 1872 until her death in 1884. She is credited with having developed the school to one of the foremost institutions for secondary education for women in Sweden.

== Life ==
Therese Kamph was born on 25 February 1836, on an estate in Hammarö, Värmland, the second youngest of nine children to Per Fredrik Kamph, a regiment commissar. She was a student of a teacher's seminar in Hamburg, and at the Högre lärarinneseminariet in Stockholm in 1870–72. She died on 19 October 1884, in Gothenburg.

=== Principal of the Kjellbergska ===
In 1872, she succeeded Helena Eldrup as principal of Kjellbergska flickskolan, where she was to play a significant part in the development of the institution.

She had the ambition to make the school one of the most prestigious in the nation, and is described as an ambitious and energetic person, with a temperament and radical ideas which caused conflicts, but charm enough to overcome them.

She made several study trips abroad to keep up to date with the latest international educational ideas, launching a radical reform program in the institution. She reformed the school's educational system and introduced a more practical language education, raising the quality of the Swedish language classes and the children's classes. She expanded the school from 40 students with three classes in 1872, to 160 students and ten classes at her death.

She also initiated a teacher's seminary for adult women educators, which was realised in 1884, though her successor did not manage to keep them longer than two years, and they had to be reintroduced in 1908. This was the first seminary of its kind outside of the capital of Stockholm.
