= Carl Fredrik Pechlin =

Swedish politician (1720–1796)

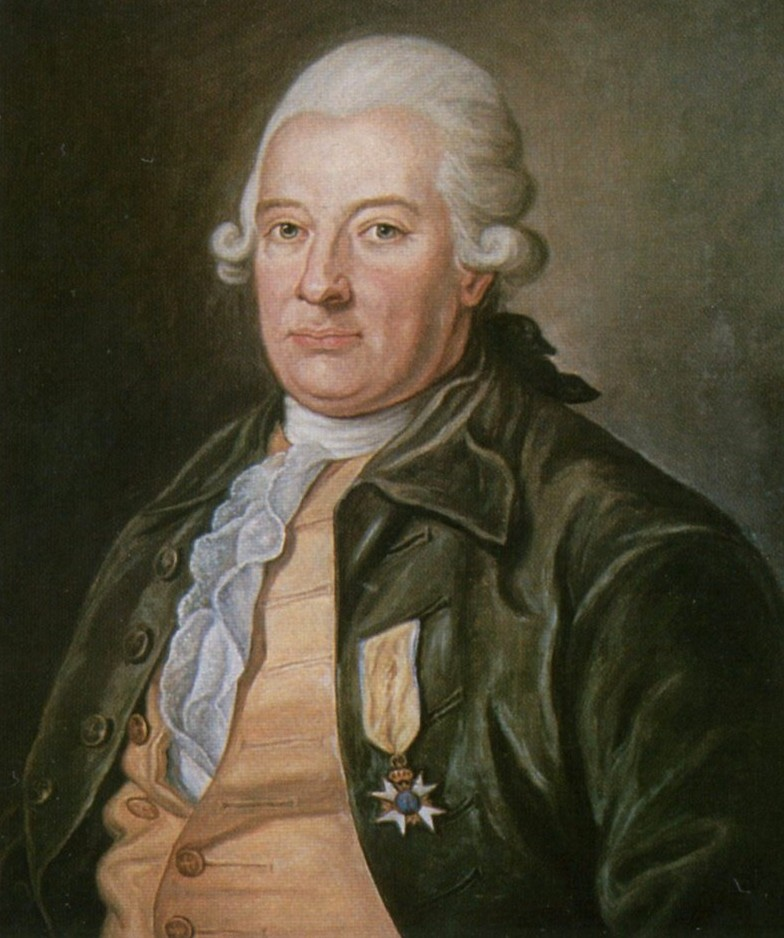
- 1774 painting by Per Krafft the Elder

Personal details
- Born: 8 August 1720
- Died: 29 May 1796 (aged 75)
- Party: Hats, Caps

Baron Carl Fredrik Pechlin (8 August 1720 – 29 May 1796) was a Swedish politician and demagogue.

== Life ==
He was son of the Holstein minister at Stockholm, Johan Pechlin, and brother of Johanna Lohm. After moving to Sweden at age six, he was educated in Sweden, and entered the Swedish army. He rose to the rank of major-general, but became famous by being the type par excellence of the corrupt and egoistic Swedish parliamentarian of the final period of the Age of Liberty; he received for many years the sobriquet of "General of the Riksdag".

Pechlin first appears prominently in Swedish politics in 1760, when by suddenly changing sides he contrived to save the Hats from impeachment. Enraged at being thus excluded from power by their former friend, the Caps procured Pechlin's expulsion from the two following Riksdags. In 1769 Pechlin sold the Hats as he had formerly sold the Caps, and was largely instrumental in preventing the projected indispensable reform of the Swedish constitution. During the revolution of 1772 he escaped from Stockholm and kept quietly in the background. In 1786, when the opposition against Gustavus III was gathering strength, Pechlin reappeared in the Riksdag as one of the leaders of the malcontents, and is said to have been at the same time in the pay of the Russian court. In 1789 he was one of the deputies whom Gustavus III kept under lock and key until he had changed the government into a semi-absolute monarchy.

It is fairly certain that Pechlin was behind the plot for murdering Gustavus in 1792. On the eve of the assassination (16 March) the principal conspirators met at his house to make their final preparations and discuss the form of government which should be adopted after the king's death. Pechlin undertook to crowd the fatal masquerade with accomplices, but took care not to be there personally. He was arrested on 23 March but nothing definite could ever be proved against him. Nevertheless, he was condemned to imprisonment in the fortress of Varberg, where he died four years later.
