= Rudbeckii flickskola =

First girls' school in Sweden

Rudbeckii flickskola ('Rudbeck's Girls' School') also called Pigeskolan ('Maidens' School') and Parthenagogium, was the first school for girls in Sweden. It was founded in the city of Västerås by the Bishop of Västerås, Johannes Rudbeckius in 1632.

== History ==
=== Foundation ===
Johannes Rudbeckius had founded the first Gymnasium (school) for males in 1623. He had the opinion that females should also be given education, and therefore founded a girls' school in 1632. The law had already in the Swedish Church Ordinance 1571 stated that girls should receive schooling, but it had left the responsibility to provide schools for them to the responsibility of the local authorities. In reality no schools had been founded, so this school was the first to implement the law.

=== Activity ===
The school was publicly financed and mainly received students from the poor classes and orphans. It was inaugurated with references to the education of the biblical Susanna.

It provided elementary education and the subjects were reading, writing, Christianity, mathematics and handicrafts. The staff consisted of the male principal and a female teacher, who was also his wife. It was under supervision of the bishop, who apparently always had a special interest in its welfare.

It is not known how long the school lasted, but it is not mentioned after the death of the bishop in 1646, so it may have ended after his death.

=== Legacy ===
Though there are examples of individual girls who were allowed to study in schools for boys in Sweden during the 17th-century, no other schools for girls were founded in Sweden until a century later, and no school for girls offered any serious academic education to females until the Societetsskolan in 1787.

In the city of Västerås specifically, no new school for girls was founded until a student of Cecilia Fryxell, Natalia Andersson, founded her school in 1858.

== Other sources ==
- Johannes Rudbeckius, urn:sbl:6999, Svenskt biografiskt lexikon (art av Erland Sellberg), hämtad 2014-02-26.
- Kyrkohistorisk Årsskrift / Tjugonde årgången, 1919 /
- Sveriges historia i sammanhang med Danmarks och Norges: 1611-1718. 3:e uppl. Carl Gustaf Grimberg.
- Studier i den svenska kyrkans syn pa kvinnans stallning i samha...Eva Åsbrink. 1962
- Årsskrift, Volym 57–60. Västmanlands fornminnesförening. 1979
- Teologisk tidskrift, Volym 10
- Den svenska kvinnorörelsen: Historisk översikt. Lydia Wahlström. P. A. Norstedt & söners förlag, 1933 - 339 sidor
- Nordisk familjebok: konversations-lexikon och realencyklopedi ny, Volym 33. Bernhard Meijer. Nordisk familjeboks förlags aktiebolag, 1922
- Sveriges städer nu och fordom: skildringar i ord och bilder, under med verkan av ett stort antal författare, Volym 14–19. P. A. Norstedt & söner, 1915
- Johannes Rudbeckius: en kämpagestalt från Sveriges storhetstid. Henrika Scheffer. 1914
- Nordisk tidskrift för politik, ekonomi och litteratur, Volym 4
