= Johanna Lohm =

Swedish baroness and educator

- Born: Johanna Juliana Josefa Pechlin von Löwenbach; 25 July 1747
- Died: 8 February 1834 (aged 86)
- Occupations: Swedish baroness and educator
- Father: Baron Johann von Pechlin Edler von Löwenbach (Pechlin von Löwenbach)

Johanna Juliana Josefa Lohm (née Pechlin von Löwenbach; 25 July 1747 – 8 February 1834) was a Swedish baroness and educator. She was the founder and principal of a girls' school in Stockholm which was active for about fifty years, until her death, and long counted as the most fashionable of its kind during the reign of Gustav III of Sweden.

== Life ==
Lohm was the daughter of Baron Johann von Pechlin Edler von Löwenbach (from 1743 Pechlin von Löwenbach), the minister of Holstein in Stockholm, and the sister of General Carl Fredrik Pechlin. She married a Lieutenant Colonel Carl Johan Lohm. After the death of her spouse and the fall of her brother, she was destitute and forced to support herself and her daughter.

Having what was described as a brilliant education herself, a reputation for great learning, and a wide net of contacts in high society, she founded a pension or a finishing school for girls from the upper classes in Stockholm. For about fifteen years, this was regarded as the finest school for girls in the capital and popular among the upper classes.

Eventually, the school fell out of fashion because of her deteriorating age and health, but also because of the behavior of her daughter Johanna (Jeanna) Catharina Lohm (1780–1860), who reportedly brought the school into disrepute by her arrogant pride and lack of decorum necessary toward the school's clients. Though her school continued until her death, it ended as an ordinary school for small children of both sexes from more humble circumstances.

Lohm supported herself mainly by accepting loans from her upper class acquaintances which she was unable to repay. She died at the age of eighty in the 1830s, and her funeral was paid for by the monarch. Her daughter, known for her pride, supported herself by making ornaments for shops and died homeless as a Stockholm original.

== See also ==
- Hammarstedtska skolan
