= Cecilia Fryxell =

Swedish educator (1806–1883)

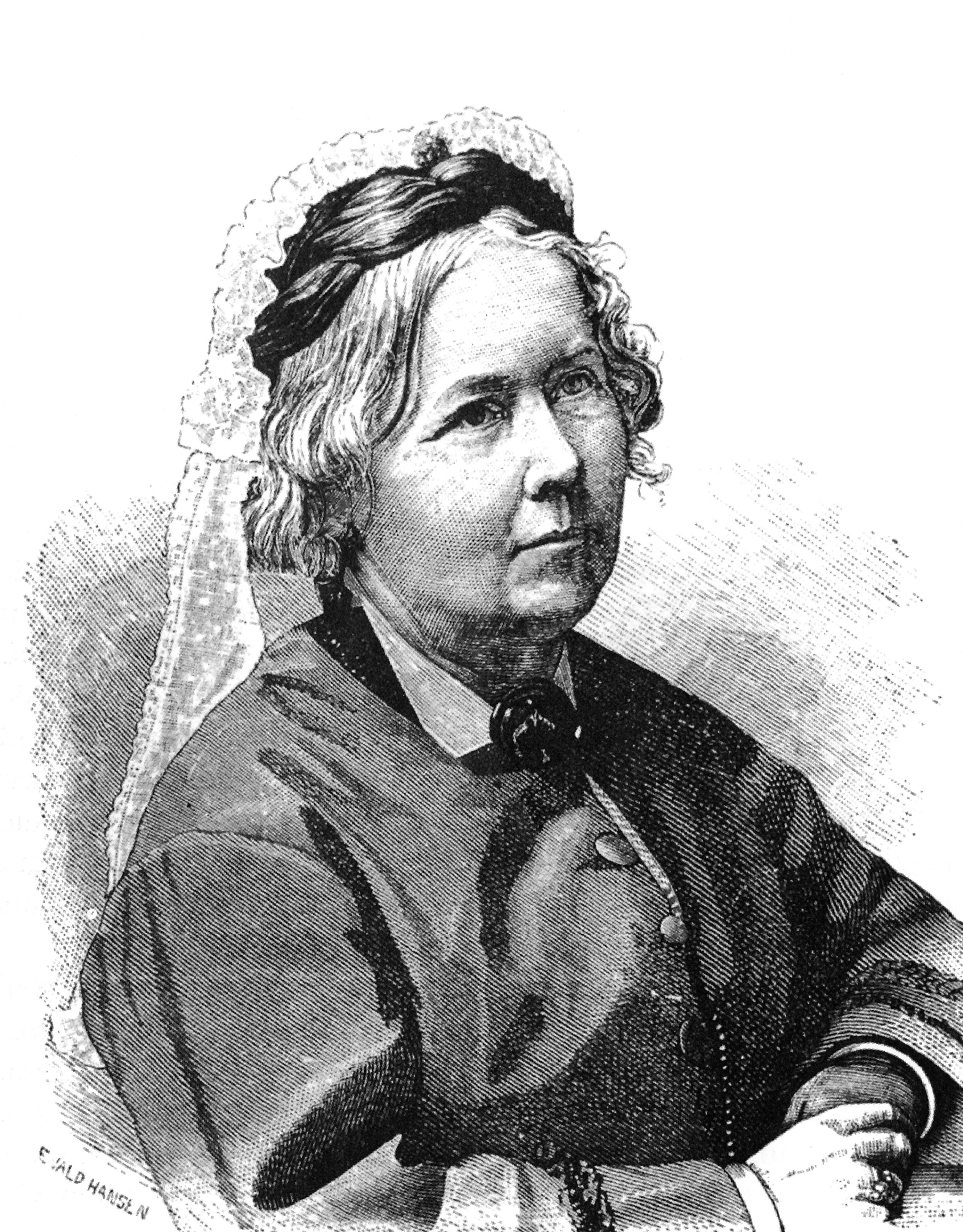
- Cecilia Fryxell during her time as principal at her school at Rostad, Kalmar. Portrait by wood engraver Evald Hansen.
- Born: Ulrica Cecilia Fryxell; 14 August 1806; Kantenberg, Vassända-Naglum, Sweden
- Died: 6 May 1883 (aged 76); Kalmar, Sweden
- Occupation(s): Educator and school principal
- Known for: Girls' education

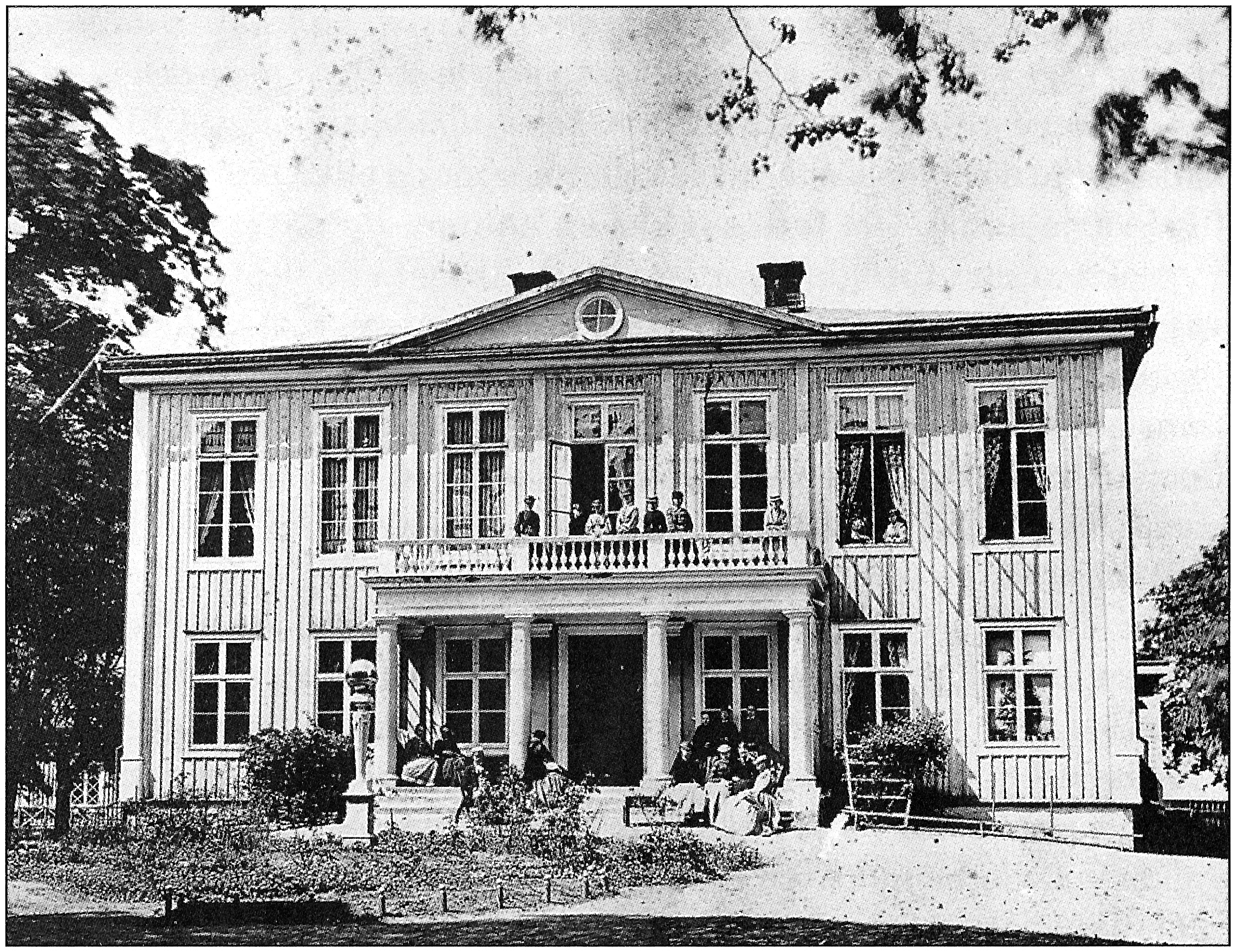
Rostad full of life during the time of Cecilia Fryxell's living and educating there (Photo from the 1860s, by John Dryselius).

Ulrica Cecilia Fryxell (14 August 1806 – 6 May 1883) was a Swedish educator and principal, regarded as a pioneer within the education of girls in Sweden. The girls' school in Sweden from the mid-19th century onward was influenced by her methods.

== Biography ==
Fryxell was born in Kantenberg, Vassända-Naglum, in 1806. Her father was Gustaf Fryxell and mother Catharina Maria Liljegren and her grandfather Jöns Olof Fryxell. She was a relative of the poet and educator Anders Fryxell. Cecilia Fryxell early supported herself as a governess to wealthy families: first to the landowner L. M. Uggla at Svaneholms manor in Dalsland and thereafter to landowner and courtier Olof Nordenfeldt at Björneborg in Värmland south of Kristinehamn In 1843, she decided to become a missionary after a sermon held by Peter Fjellstedt. Fjellstedt arranged for her to be educated for missionary service at a missionary institute at Basel in Switzerland. However, she was considered unsuitable as a missionary for health reasons. Instead, she studied the boarding schools for girls in Switzerland and Germany in 1843–1847, and was employed as a teacher at Waisenhaus in the Basel Institute.

=== Principal ===
In 1847, she returned to Sweden, and was employed at the Societetsskolan in Gothenburg. In 1848, she opened her first school for girls in Helsingborg with the help of Peter Wieselgren, vicar in Helsingborg. The school had room for 40 students. In 1852, she moved her girls' school to an estate of Count G. Lewenhaupt, Carlslund outside Västerås, where she could house 100 students. However, she wished to have her own building for her school, and in 1858, she was able to buy the manor Rostad outside Kalmar, where her school was housed from 1859 until 1877.

Her school at Rostad was entirely her own. She accepted students from all over Sweden, from neighboring nations as well as further afield: she even had some students from North America. 30 of her students lived at the school. These places were in such demand that parents booked places for their daughters for years in advance. The students were divided into three classes as well as one teachers' class. A foreign language was practiced every week, and exercised with the teacher in the afternoon of that week. She herself was the teacher in the subjects history and Christianity. She is not considered to have been innovative in introducing new subjects, but she was recommended for her way of focusing on the personality of her students. She is described as strong and forceful and not tolerant in questions of religion and personal morals, but despite this, life at her school was described as informal, familial and jolly. In 1877, she donated her school to the state and started an elementary school seminary on the estate.

Fryxell died in 1883 in Kalmar.

== Legacy ==
Fryxell had a large influence upon girls' schools and women's education in mid 19th-century Sweden, when a wave of girls' schools were established all over the country. Many of her students became teachers and founders of girls' schools themselves in other parts of the country, such as Elsa Borg in Gävle, Sophia Posse and Frederique Hammarstedt in Stockholm, Natalia Andersson in Västerås, Maria Henschen in Uppsala and Sigrid Rudebeck in Gothenburg.

== See also ==
- Mazahr Makatemele one of the first Afro-Swedish women whose life is documented, worked for Fryxell
