= Kjellbergska flickskolan =

Girls' school in Gothenburg, Sweden

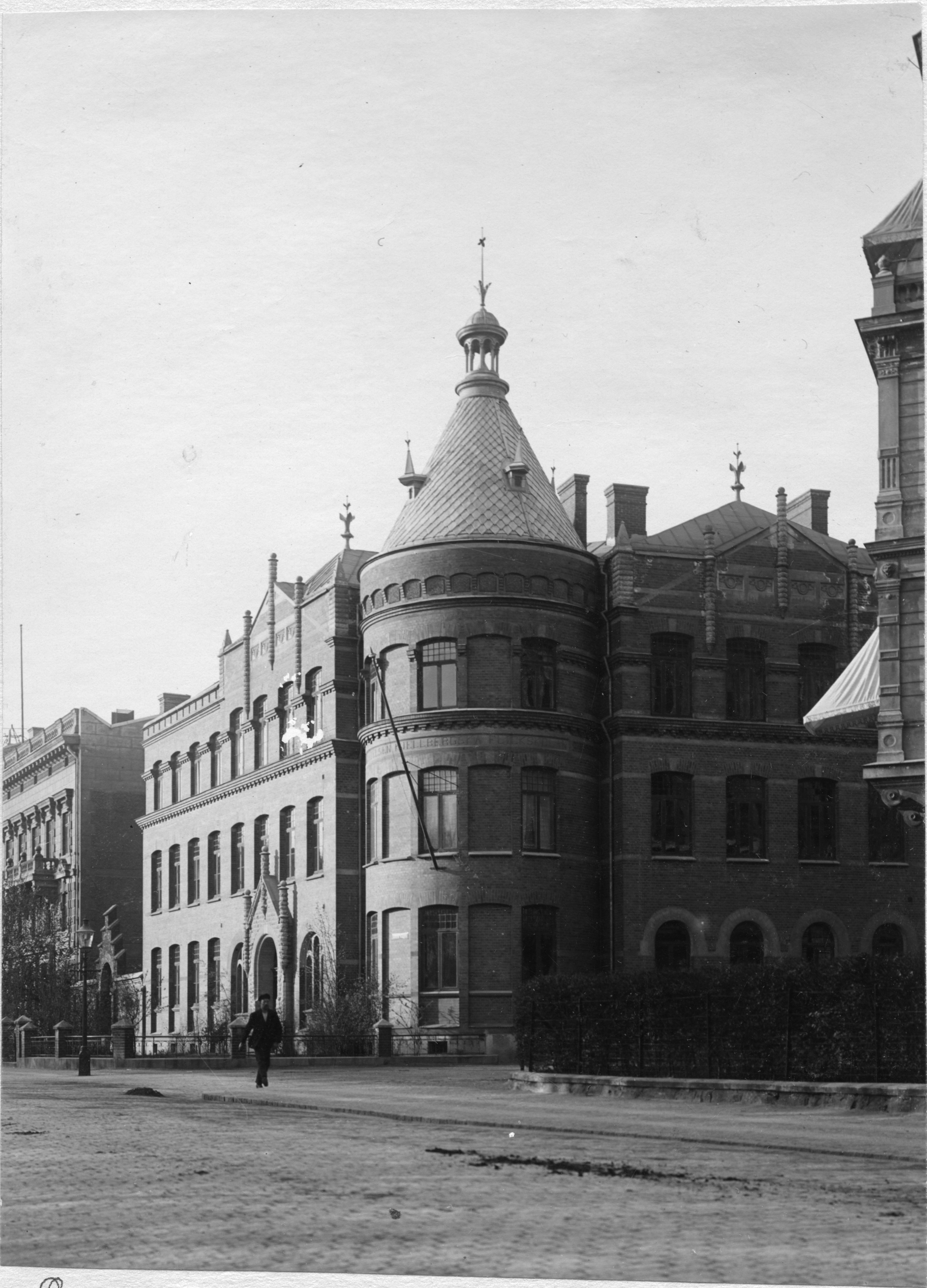
Kjellbergska flickskolan in Gothenburg (1906)

Kjellbergska flickskolan ('Kjellberg Girls' School') was a Girls' School in Gothenburg, Sweden. It was active between 1835 and 1967.

== History ==
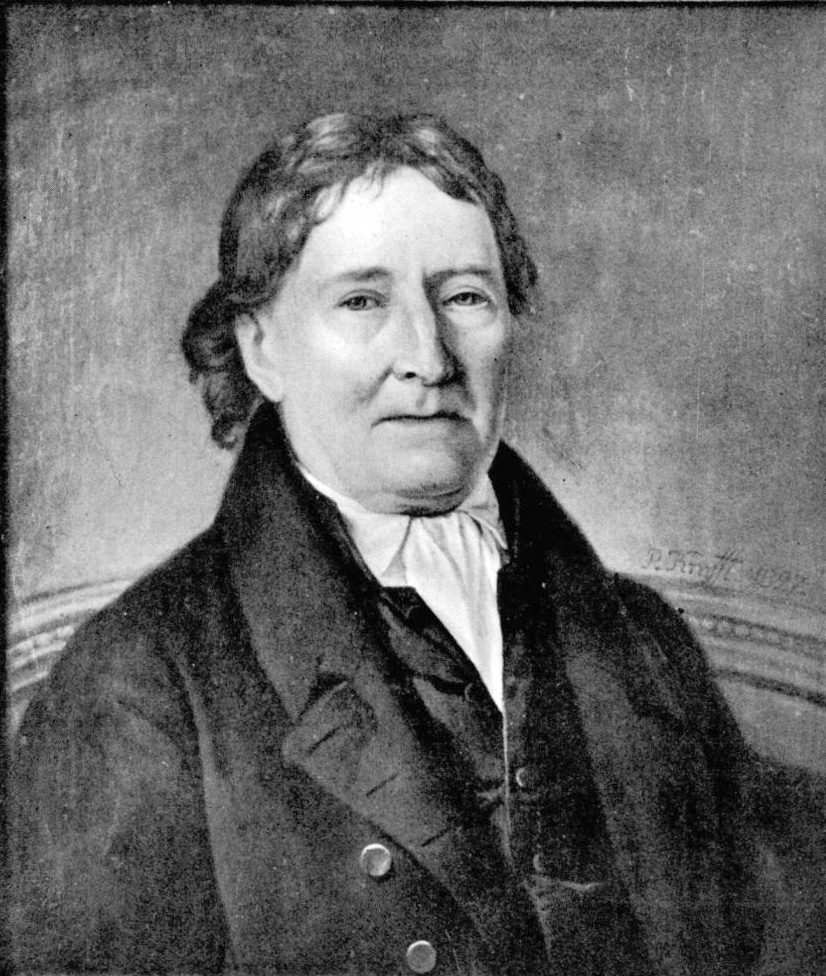
Jonas Kjellberg (1827)

The school was founded by a fund granted in the will of the wealthy merchant Jonas Kjellberg (1752–1832). Jonas Kjellberg was a merchant and trader who in 1808, formed an import and shipping company under the name Jonas Kjellberg & Co. Kjellberg died in 1832, and the school was inaugurated in 1835.

The stated purpose of the school was to provide education to make it possible for females to support themselves professionally. This separated the school from most other contemporary girls' schools, which had the purpose to educate their students as ideal wives and mothers, and it was thereby a part of the wave of a new type of girls' schools, which was established in Sweden in the mid-19th century in response to a contemporary Swedish debate about women's education. Further more, Kjellbergska flickskolan accepted students free of charge, which made it possible to accept just the kind of student which answered to the description of a female who would be likely to need to support herself, normally from the middle classes. In this, the school followed the example of the Fruntimmersföreningens flickskola from 1815.

The most common occupation socially acceptable for a professional middle class woman in the 19th-century was that of a teacher or governess, and the school also functioned as an educational institution for female teachers. Between 1908 and 1932 (after a temporary experiment in 1884-86), it also offered teachers training courses to adult women. The graduates of these courses were, from 1910 onward, counted as equal to those from the Högre lärarinneseminariet in Stockholm.

The subjects were religion, French, German, English, Swedish, history, geography, writing, mathematics, music, drawing and handicrafts. The number of students counted 15 in the ages of 9-15 in 1835; 24 in 1842 and 92 in 1875. The school was managed by a female principal supervised by a board. It moved from one address to another until it was finally provided with a permanent home in 1870.

At the time of the introduction of compulsory elementary schools in Sweden in 1842, it was one of five schools in Sweden to provide academic secondary education to females: the others being Societetsskolan (1786) and Fruntimmersföreningens flickskola (1815) in Gothenburg, Askersunds flickskola (1812) in Askersund and Wallinska skolan (1831) in Stockholm.

In 1943, the school became a part of the communal school system in accordance with a new educational law, and in 1967, it was abolished in accordance with the new law against girls' schools.

=== Principals ===
- 1835-1872: Helena Eldrup (1800-1872)
- 1872-1884: Therese Kamph (1836-84)
- 1884-1886: Hanna Lindström
- 1886-1912: Martha von Friesen (1853-1924)
- 1912-1931: Thyra Kullgren (1870-1946)

== Other sources ==
- Göteborgs Kalender för 1857, Utgifven af S. A. Hedlund och Anton Berg, Hedlund & Lindskog, Göteborg 1857 s. 113
- Kronologiska anteckningar om viktigare händelser i Göteborg 1619-1982, Agne Rundqvist, Ralf Scander, Anders Bothén, Elof Lindälv, utgiven av Göteborgs hembygdsförbund 1982 s. 40, 60, 74, 112
- Från Börsen till Park Avenue: Intressanta göteborgsbyggnader uppförda mellan 1850 och 1950, uppställda i kronologisk ordning och avbildade på vykort, Ove Nylén, Haspen Förlag 1988 ISBN 91-970916-3-4 s. 46
- Kjellbergare : om en flickskola, red. Helena Jos Person, Kjellbergska flickskolans kamratförening, Göteborg 2010 ISBN 978-91-978806-5-7
- Marianne Johansson.En studie av synen på kvinnor och högre utbildning. I samband med läroverksreformen 1927
