= Societetsskolan =

School in Gothenburg, Sweden

Societetsskolan i Göteborg för döttrar ('Society School for Daughters in Gothenburg') or simply Societetsskolan ('Society School'), was a Swedish girls' school managed by the congregation of the Moravian Church in Gothenburg from 1 November 1787 until 1857. It is referred to as the first girls' school in Sweden, because it was the first institution to provide serious academic secondary education to females.

The school is known under many different names. Because it was initially intended to serve the children of the Moravian congregation, it was called Brödraförsamlingens flickskola i Göteborg ('Girls' School of the Unity of the Brethren in Gothenburg') or Evangeliska Brödraförsamlingens flickskola i Göteborg ('Girls' School of the Unity of the Evangelical Brethren in Gothenburg'), but also, commonly, as Salsskolan ('Hall School'), because it was initially held in the prayer hall of the Moravian congregation.

== History ==
=== Foundation ===
The school was inaugurated on 1 November 1787. It was intended to introduce in Sweden the ideal of equal education for males and females, which was an ideal of the Moravian Church and common among the schools of the congregation in other nations. Until 1817, the school used the prayer hall of the Moravian congregation, and to go there was therefore commonly referred to as going to the hall, hence the common name Hall School. It was given its own building in 1817.

=== Activity ===
Initially, the school was intended to serve the children of the Moravian Church, but it was open to non-members of the Moravian church as well, and already shortly after its foundation, the school became popular among non-Moravians. Between 1799 and 1814, there were also separate classes for boys at the school. The school had a very good reputation and high popularity from the start, and it soon became common for the wealthy merchant families of Gothenburg to have their daughters schooled there.

The school was not free, but the parents had to pay a fee, and approve of the school principles when they enrolled their children. The school employed both male and female teachers, and the female teachers had the professional title of "Aunt". From 1814, the school also offered sleeping accommodation for students not residing in Gothenburg, and was from this point also part boarding school. The school had four classes in 1814, and six classes in 1836.

The official purpose of the school was to "bring the children to Jesus" by having them renounce worldly pleasures: the official main subject of the school was Christian Ethics, and the discipline was strict. However, in accordance with the beliefs of the Moravian Church, the religious tuition was emotional rather than harsh or strict.

The girls were given the tuition in household tasks commonly given in girls' schools, but they were also given a structured education in German, French, English, Geography, History, Mathematics, Drawing and Handicrafts, as well as the Swedish language, which was an innovation in Sweden. While they were not given the education in scientific subjects given to the boys, no other school in Sweden at the time offered a structured secondary education in these subjects to girls.

Amongst its staff were the educator Helena Eldrup (up to 1835) and the reforming educator Cecilia Fryxell (in 1846–1847), and among its students were the writer Emily Nonnen, and the reforming pedagogue Mathilda Hall, who in 1857 founded the successor school to Societetsskolan: Mathilda Halls skola ('Mathilda Hall's School').

=== Legacy ===
The school has been referred to as the first girls' school in Sweden. Technically, this is not correct, as the first girls' school was Rudbeckii flickskola in 1632, and there were numerous schools for girls in 18th-century Sweden. However, the title is given because it was the first girls' school in Sweden to provide serious secondary education to girls in a manner more equal to that given to boys than in the other girls' schools in Sweden, which were essentially finishing schools.

At the time of the introduction of compulsory elementary school in Sweden in 1842, it was one of five schools in Sweden to provide academic secondary education to female students; the others being Fruntimmersföreningens flickskola (1815) and Kjellbergska flickskolan (1833) in Gothenburg, Askersunds flickskola (1812) in Askersund and Wallinska skolan (1831) in Stockholm.
