= Askersunds flickskola =

Askersunds flickskola (Askersund Girls' School), was a Swedish girls' school in Askersund, active from 1812 until 1906. It was the second school in Sweden to offer secondary education to female students. Formally, Askersunds flickskola was a branch of the Askersund secondary educational school for boys. The schools were formally referred to as Prins Oscars goss- och flickläroverk (The Prince Oscar Boys' and Girls' Secondary Educational Academy).

== History ==
The school was founded by the well off intellectual apothecary Carl Göransson, who was active in Stockholm but was raised in Askersund. Interested in educational issues, he founded an educational society in Askersund, who founded the secondary education school for boys as well as that for girls. The school was not founded for economic reasons, but out of discontent over the education of females, which was at the time a debated issue in intellectual circles, and the school's program was at the time a unique innovation in Sweden.

Askersunds flickskola employed the same educated (male) teachers as the adjoining secondary school for boys, and the academic quality of the education was therefore high. The principal, however, was always to be female: she was to function as teacher in practical household education and moral subjects, and guard the students. The principal was subject to the vicar and the school direction, not to the parents of the students, which was an innovation and unique at the time concerning schools open to girls. As was normal for academic secondary educational girls' schools, the education was costly and the students were normally from the middle classes. An exception was given to students related to the founders of the school.

At the time of the introduction of the compulsory elementary school in Sweden in 1842, only five schools in Sweden provided academic secondary education to females: the others being Societetsskolan (1786), Fruntimmersföreningens flickskola (1815) and Kjellbergska flickskolan (1833) in Gothenburg, and Wallinska skolan (1831) in Stockholm. Of these five schools, Askersunds flickskola and Wallinska skolan were considered to offer the highest academic quality to their students.
