= Askersund =

Place in Närke, Sweden

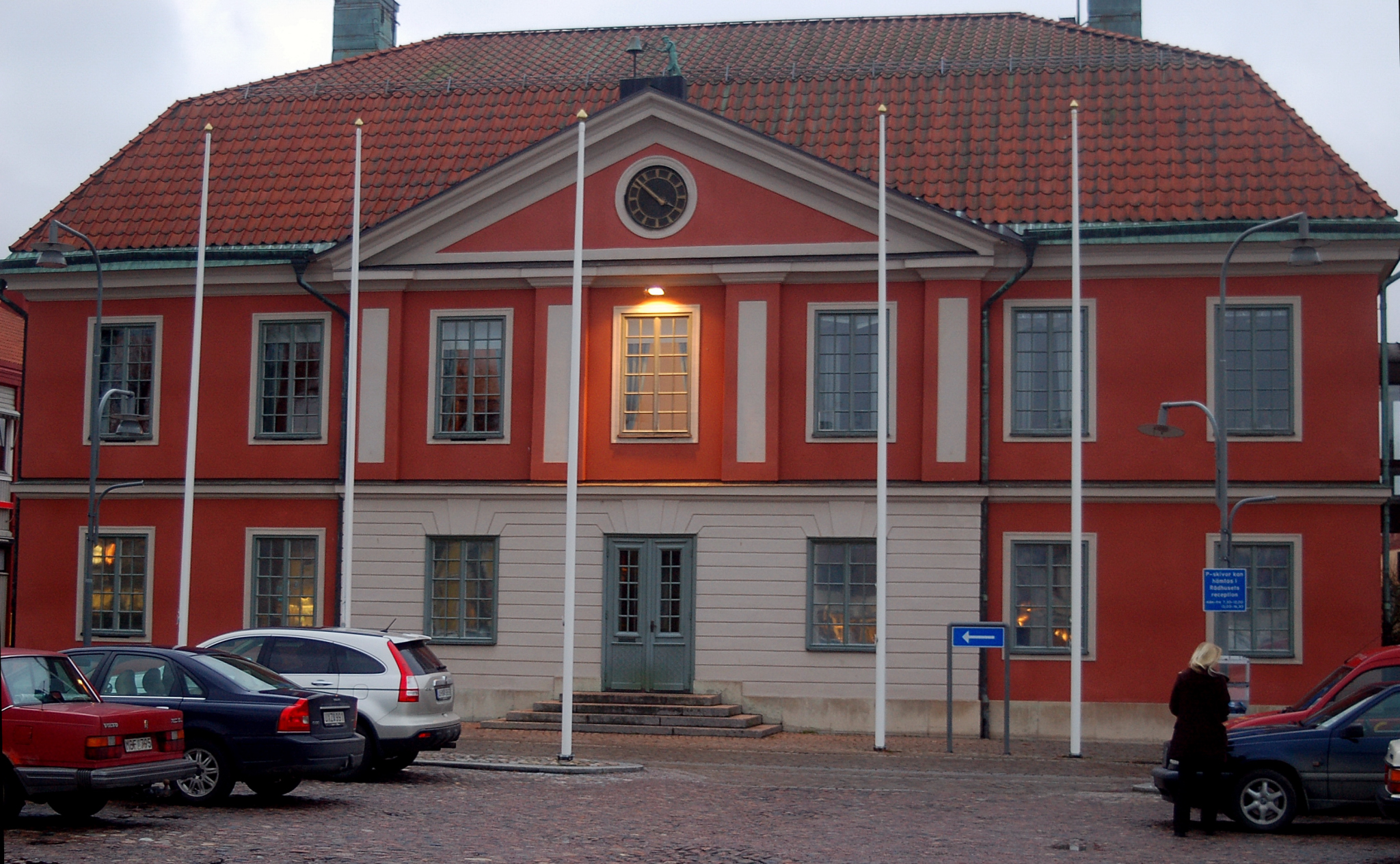
- Askersund Town hall

- Location within Örebro Location within Sweden
- Coordinates: 58°52′47″N 14°54′10″E
- Country: Sweden
- Province: Närke
- County: Örebro County
- Municipality: Askersund Municipality
- Founded: 1643

Area
  - Total: 2.7802 km^{2} (1.0734 sq mi)
- Elevation: 101 m (331 ft)

Population (31 December 2010)
  - Total: 3,887
  - Density: 1,398/km^{2} (3,620/sq mi)
- Time zone: UTC+1 (CET)
  - Summer (DST): UTC+2 (CEST)
- Postal code: 696 xx
- Area code: (+46) 696
- Website: Official website

Askersund is a locality and the seat of Askersund Municipality, Örebro County, Sweden with a population census of 3,887 inhabitants in 2010.

== Geography ==
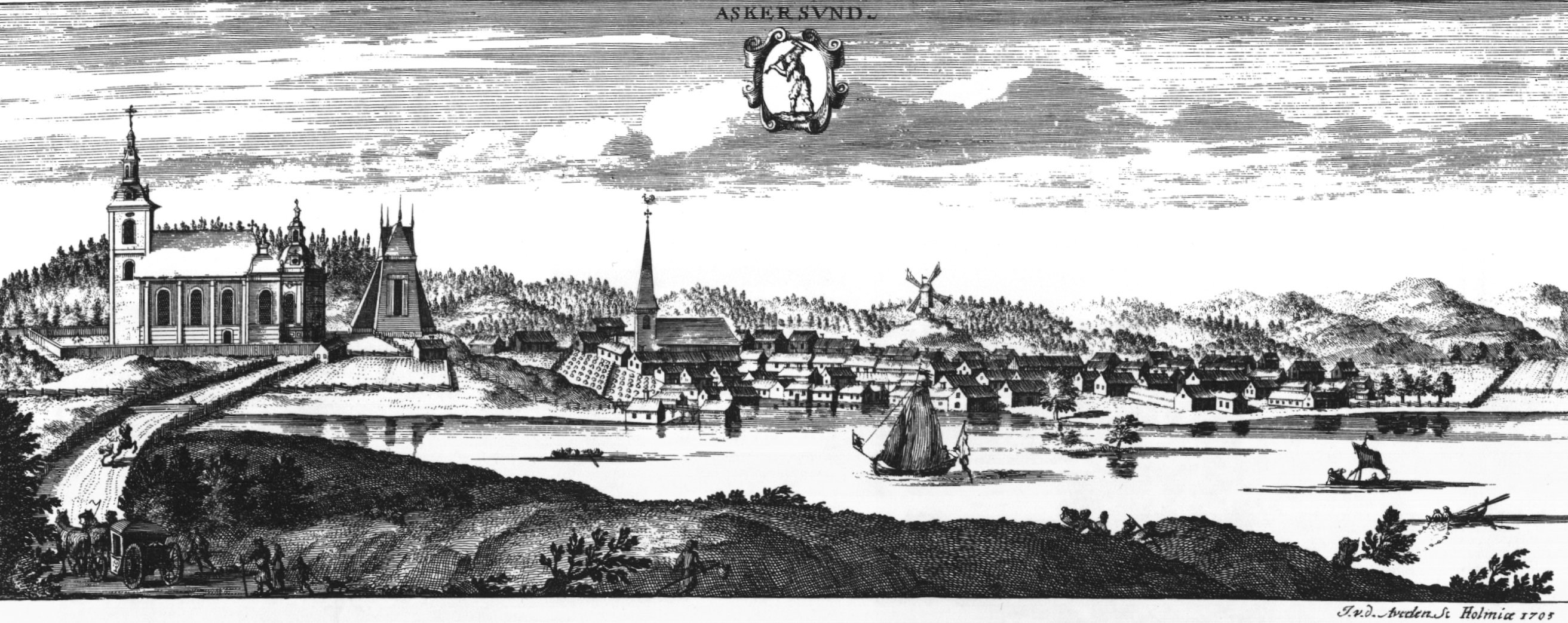
Askersund in 1705, in Suecia antiqua et hodierna.

Askersund is a popular tourist destination with swimming and nature experiences. The city centre is still marked by its wooden buildings and their two churches. Sophia Magdalena was designed by Olof tempelman and Askersund country Church by Jean de la Vallée and Erik Dahlberg. The city is located on the edge of the forest of Tiveden at Lake Alsen forming North of Lake Vättern and along the lake, just outside the city is Husabergsudde with bathing and camping. From the city, it has views of Lake Vättern and Tivedsskogen. On the other side of the water is Prince Gustaf's Castle, Stjernsund.

== History ==
The town Askersund traces its origin from the 14th century. In 1643, it was significant enough to receive its charter as one of the cities in Sweden. Despite its small size, Askersund is for historical reasons normally still referred to as a city, although Statistics Sweden nowadays defines a city as a locality with more than 10,000 inhabitants.

In the 19th century, Askersund was planned to be the site of one of the two supply fortresses for Karlsborg Fortress, located on an island in Lake Vättern, now belonging to Karlsborg Municipality. In 1813, Askersunds flickskola, the second institution to give females higher education in Sweden, was founded in Askersund.
