= List of schools in Ghana =

Number of public and private educational institutions in Ghana
Category	Number
Primary schools	12,228
Junior high schools	6,418
Senior high schools	475
Polytechnics	10
Post-secondary teacher training	38
Universities	8

This is a list of notable schools in the African country of Ghana.

== A ==
- Aburi Girls' Senior High School, Aburi, Eastern Region
- Accra Academy, in Kaneshie, Greater Accra Region
- Adisadel College, in Cape Coast, Central Region
- Aggrey Memorial A.M.E. Zion Senior High School, in Cape Coast, Central Region
- Akosombo International School, in Akosombo, Eastern Region
- Anglican Senior High School, in Kumasi, Ashanti Region
- Axim Girls Senior High School

== B ==
- Barekese Senior High School, in Barekese, Ashanti Region
- Bimbilla Senior High School
- Bishop Herman College, in Kpando, Volta Region
- Boa Amponsem Senior High School, in Dunkwa-on-Offin, Central Region
- Bolgatanga Girls Senior High School
- Bompeh Senior High Technical School, in Sekondi-Takoradi, Western Region

== D ==
- Dahin Sheli School
- Delhi Public School

== G ==
- Galaxy International School, Accra
- Gambaga Girls Senior High School
- German Swiss International School Accra
- Ghana Institute of Journalism, Osu Ringway, Accra
- Ghana International School
- Ghanata Senior High School, Dodowa, Gt. Accra
- Ghana-Lebanon Islamic School (GLIS)

== K ==
- Koforidua Senior High Technical School
- KNUST Senior High School, in Kumasi, Ashanti Region
- Kumasi Academy, in Kumasi, Ashanti Region
- Oyoko Methodist Senior High School, in Koforidua

== L ==
- Lycée Français d'Accra
- Labone Senior High School

== M ==
- Methodist Girls Senior High School
- Mfantsipim School, in Cape Coast (established in 1876 as Methodist "Wesleyan High School")
- Mim Senior High School, in Mim, Brong-Ahafo Region

== O ==
- Odorgonno Senior High School
- Ofori Panin Senior High School
- Okuapeman Senior High School
- OLA Girls Senior High School (Ho)
- OLA Girls Senior High School (Kenyasi)
- Osei Kyeretwie Secondary School

== P ==
- Pentecost University College
- Pope John Senior High School and Minor Seminary, Koforidua, Eastern Region
- Presbyterian Boys' Secondary, in Legon, Accra

== Q ==
- Queen of Apostles Boarding School, in Elmina, Central Region

== R ==
- Regent University College of Science and Technology
- Ridge Church School

== S ==
- Serwaa Kesse Girls' Senior High School
- St. Augustine's College (Cape Coast)
- St. Augustine's Senior High (Bogoso)
- St. Louis Secondary
- St. Mary's Senior High School
- St. Peter's Mission Schools (Day & Boarding), in Accra
- St. Peter's Boys Senior High School

== T ==
- Tamale Girls Secondary School
- Tamale Technical University (TaTU)
- Tema International School

== U ==
- University of Education, Winneba, in Winneba, Central Region
- University of Ghana, in Legon, Greater Accra Region
- University of Ghana Primary School Legon, in Legon, Greater Accra Region
- George Grant University of Mines and Technology, in Tarkwa, Western Region
- Kwame Nkrumah University of Science and Technology, in Kumasi, Ashanti Region

== W ==
- Wesley Girls' High School, in Cape Coast, Central Region

== See also ==
- Education in Ghana
- List of senior high schools in Ghana
