= Kentucky Country Day School =

Prep school in Louisville, Kentucky, US

Coordinates: 38.3058176798°N 85.5822357072°W

Location
- 4100 Springdale Road; Louisville, KY 40241; United States

Information
- Type: Private, nonsectarian
- Motto: Citizen, Scholar, Steward
- Established: 1972
- Sister school: Dahin Sheli School
- Head of School: Deena J. Carey
- Grades: Junior Kindergarten–12
- Enrollment: 862
- Campus size: 80 acres (320,000 m^{2})
- Campus type: Suburban
- Colors: Royal blue and gold
- Mascot: "Baxter" or Bearcat IV (2005–present)
- Nickname: Bearcats
- Website: www.kcd.org

Kentucky Country Day (KCD) is an independent co-educational college preparatory day school for junior kindergarten through 12th grade located in Louisville, Kentucky. It is located in northeastern Jefferson County on a large suburban campus.

== History ==
In 1967, Aquinas Preparatory School (all-male) combined with Louisville Country Day (all-male, founded 1951). Subsequently, Kentucky Home School for Girls (all-female, founded 1863) was added, and the hybrid name Kentucky Country Day was created. In 1973, Kentucky Military Institute (all-male, founded 1845) disbanded and its alumni and military honor code were adopted by Kentucky Country Day.

KCD was initially located on the former LCD campus (Rock Creek Drive) in Louisville, adjacent to Seneca Park for 7th grade to senior class students. Kindergarten through 6th grade students were located on the former APS campus (Browns Lane). A bus called the Blue Goose would transfer students between both campuses. In 1972, in a close vote, students selected the nickname Bearcats over Thoroughbreds as the school mascot along with its present-day colors, royal blue and gold.

In 1978, the school relocated to its current campus in eastern Louisville on Springdale Road near Old Brownsboro Road. Since this move, the campus has expanded several times, including the construction of a new upper school building in 2000, a theatre in 2010, and a STEAM building in 2022.

== Traditions ==
While KCD has been in existence since 1972, many traditions from its predecessors remain. The school's honor code was adopted from Kentucky Military Institute. The football team's Monohan Field is named after the field at Aquinas Prep. "The Rock" donated by Jack T. Irwin from the original Locks in Louisville from the Ohio River, is located under the KCD football scoreboard, it is touched by KCD football players before entering the field, just as it was at Aquinas Prep in the 1960s.

A junior class tradition involves the "Junior Class Ring Ceremony" where each student receives a class ring preceded by a speech from an alumnus.

Every student receives a yearly schoolbook, called the Fleur De Lis, a name tracing back to the name of the LCD yearbook. A fleur de lis is affixed to both school's official seals as the French royalty symbol also symbolizes the City of Louisville where the school's campus is located.

== Academics ==
Every high school student is required to use a personal computer as the entire campus has a wireless network. KCD became the second high school in Jefferson County to establish this mandate. Several instructional courses provide advanced placement courses, where a majority of students take at least one course.

The school possesses a Cum Laude Society, a society crafted for vigorous secondary school institutions.

As a college preparatory institution, most students take college testing exams and matriculate into post-secondary institutions.

== Athletics ==
KCD is a member of the Kentucky High School Athletic Association (KHSAA), competing in Class "A" for the three sports that are classified by enrollment: football, track, and cross country. Several sports, most notably basketball and soccer along with volleyball, baseball, and softball, compete in All "A" tournaments which serve as de facto state championships for the state's smallest schools, though not officially recognized by the KHSAA.

The Bearcat athletic program has garnered 17 Kentucky state championships and 29 state runner-up honors. The most recent state titles include the 2004 field hockey, 2007 and 2021 All "A" boys' soccer, and the 2008, 2010, 2012, 2015, 2016, 2017, 2018, 2021, and 2022 girls' lacrosse teams. State runner-up finishes include field hockey in 2006 and 2007, girls lacrosse in 2006, 2007, 2009, 2011, 2013, and 2014 and boys' tennis in 2001 and 2008. There have been 128 individual state champions (60) and runners-up (68). These state champions include 16 boys' swimming and diving, 18 girls' gymnastics, 5 boys' track and field, 6 girls' swimming and 3 boys' tennis individual medals. The most recent individual state champions include swimmer Sam Crockett (100 breast stroke) in 2011, track and field athlete Reed Cohen (discus) in 2011, and track and field and cross country athlete Haley Shoenegge (3200m in 2021 & 2022; 2022 Girls Cross Country Class 1A State Individual Champion).

== Arts ==
A minimum of two student performances are conducted annually by both the upper and middle school divisions. Historically, these performances occurred either in the school's commons room (middle school) or at the Clifton Center (upper school), a nearby theater in Louisville from Spring 1980 to Spring 2010. Beginning in Fall 2010, all performances are staged at the new theatre building.

== Endowment ==
There are several endowments dedicated to the institution and its students. Some of these endowments provide financial assistance, training for faculty, athletic enhancements and improvements regarding school maintenance. The most recent endowment to be announced (May 2009) was a two million dollar grant from the Malone Foundation.

== Notable alumni ==
- Owsley Brown Frazier, philanthropist, founder of Frazier History Museum
- Stephen Gaghan, Academy Award-winning film writer and director; credits include Traffic, Syriana, Rules of Engagement (expelled before graduation)
- David Grubbs, musician
- Catherine McCord, model, actress
- Stu Pollard, film producer, writer and director; credits include Nice Guys Sleep Alone, Keep Your Distance
- Will Smith (catcher), baseball player, Los Angeles Dodgers
- Erin Wilhelmi, actress

=== Kentucky Military Institute ===
- Jim Backus, actor; credits included Thurston Howell III on Gilligan's Island
- John Y. Brown, Jr., Governor of Kentucky (1979–1983) (attended)
- Stephen Gano Burbridge, Union Major General in the Civil War
- Victor Mature, actor; credits include Samson and Delilah, My Darling Clementine
- Danny Sullivan, race car driver; winner of the 1985 Indianapolis 500
- Fred Willard, actor; numerous television and film credits include Best in Show (film), This Is Spinal Tap

== See also ==
- List of schools in Louisville, Kentucky
- Country Day School movement
