= Queen of Apostles Boarding School, Elmina =

Queen of Apostles Boarding School
- Elmina; Central Region; Ghana

Information
- Type: Public primary boarding school
- Established: March 1884 (142 years ago)
- Founders: Congregation of the Missionary Sisters of Our Lady of Apostles
- Faculty: 5
- Grades: 1st–7th grades

Queen of Apostles Boarding School (formerly OLA Boarding) is a public Catholic primary boarding school for girls, located in Elmina, in the Central Region of Ghana. The school is sited on a hill just beside St. Joseph's Minor Basilica, the first Catholic church in Ghana.

The school was established in March 1884 by the Congregation of the Missionary Sisters of Our Lady of Apostles and was the first Catholic school for girls in Elmina.

== See also ==
- Education in Ghana
- List of boarding schools
- List of schools in Ghana
