= Owsley Brown Frazier =

American philanthropist (1935–2012)

- Born: May 7, 1935; Louisville, Kentucky
- Died: August 16, 2012 (aged 77); Louisville, Kentucky
- Occupations: Executive, entrepreneur
- Known for: Philanthropy

Owsley Brown Frazier (May 7, 1935 – August 16, 2012) was a philanthropist from Louisville, Kentucky United States who founded the Frazier History Museum. He retired from the board of directors of the Brown-Forman corporation, which his grandfather George Garvin Brown founded in 1870, and is one of the largest American-owned companies in the spirits and wine business. He was raised in Louisville.

== Business career ==
Frazier was vice-chairman and the public face of Brown-Forman from 1983 until his retirement in 2000, but he remained on the board of directors. He first worked for the company as a trainee in 1955. After graduating from the University of Louisville he became the company's lawyer in 1960, then joined the board of directors and became director of personnel in 1964.

Frazier owned Bittners, LLC a 150-year-old interior design, architectural and furniture business in Louisville.

He served as director of Greater Louisville Inc. and the Kentucky Economic Development Corporation. He was an early co-chairman of the board to study building the KFC Yum! Center. He also served on the board of Louisville-based Papa John's Pizza.

He was appointed by Kentucky Governor Paul Patton and reappointed by Gov. Ernie Fletcher to serve on the University of Louisville Board of Trustees.

== Philanthropy ==
Frazier was recognized as one of the leading individual donors to Jewish Hospital/Frazier Rehab, Bellarmine University, Kentucky Country Day and the University of Louisville, of which he was a lifetime member of the board of trustees. He was a leading donor to Jewish Hospital in Louisville, including the Frazier Rehab Institute, which is named after his mother.

In 2004, it was estimated that he had given over $500 million to charity throughout his life.

=== Weapon collection and museum ===
For much of his life, Frazier collected historic guns and knives. His collection began with a long rifle, made circa 1820 in Bardstown, Kentucky and given to him by his grandfather. This rifle was permanently lost in the tornado which hit Louisville during the 1974 Super Outbreak, and Frazier credited the event with sparking his interest in collecting historic weapons on a larger scale. His collection included weapons such as Theodore Roosevelt's "Big Stick", a 1866 Winchester carbine owned by Buffalo Bill Cody and guns used by General George Armstrong Custer. Most of the weapons were from 1840 to 1910.

In 2000, the Kentucky Historical Society asked him to present his collection in Frankfort, Kentucky. Thousands of people attended the exhibit, surprising Frazier and leading him to think about doing a long-term exhibition. In 2001, he purchased two former warehouses in Downtown Louisville and announced plans to open a museum, initially called the Frazier Historical Arms Museum but later renamed the Frazier International History Museum once the Royal Armouries of Britain chose to display part of their collection at the Frazier. The museum dropped the international from its name and is now known as the Frazier History Museum in March 2011, while the Royal Armouries Collection is still on display, the museum's collection will begin to reflect local Kentucky history, and de-emphasize the weapons collection. Shortly after this, a world-class travelling exhibit, Da Vinci- The Genius went on display.

Frazier donated most of the $32 million in startup funds for the museum. Frazier's mission statement for the museum is "To evoke a passion for the knowledge and understanding of history, so that all who pass through our doors may learn from the past, live in the present and better prepare for the future."

== Political fundraising ==
Frazier donated money and organized fundraisers for both Democrats such as Kentucky Governor Paul E. Patton and Republicans such as George W. Bush. A fundraiser at his house in 1999 for Bush set the record for most money raised for a primary candidate in Kentucky, collecting over $650,000.

From 2000 to 2004, he donated over $89,000 to political campaigns - nearly all of them Republican.

== Awards ==
Frazier holds honorary doctorates from the University of Louisville and Bellarmine University. He won the Louisville Urban League's Equality Award in 1990. In 2002 he was given the Founders Award, a lifetime achievement award and the highest honor given by the Louisville Historical League.

== Personal ==
Frazier lived in a house built by his grandfather in 1910 called "The Avish" in the suburban city of Harrods Creek, Kentucky. He also owns a 400-acre (1.6 km^{2}) farm in Shelby County, Kentucky. His only marriage ended in a divorce, and he had three daughters.

When asked what it is like to use a wheelchair, Frazier responded, "You know, my brain is not in a wheelchair. It's just my body. Basically what I have is bone spurs, both within and outside my spinal column. I'm fairly much paralyzed from basically my waist down. With a mobile wheelchair like this, I can get out and move around really pretty well. The last thing in the world that I wanted to do was to stay at home, sit around and do nothing."

Frazier was a member of the Sons of the American Revolution, and the River Valley Club. He was a member of the first graduating class of Louisville Country Day, which is the merged male parent school to the current Kentucky Country Day School and received a law degree from the University of Louisville.
