= German Swiss International School (Ghana) =

German International School Accra in Ghana

- German: Schweizerschule Akkra
- Accra; Ghana

Information
- Former name: Ramseyer Memorial Swiss School
- Established: 1966; 60 years ago
- Teaching staff: 15
- Years: Nursery - Year 10
- Enrollment: 90 (2013)
- Language: German; English
- Website: gis-accra.org/en/

German International School Accra (GSIS-Accra or German: Schweizerschule Akkra) is a German international school in Accra, Ghana. It serves elementary and junior high school levels.

== History ==
In 1966, the RMS Swiss School, meaning Ramseyer Memorial opened in Accra with two teachers and 23 students. The school became jointly sponsored by Germany and Switzerland and uses a bilingual German–English programme.

== Demographics ==
As of 2007, almost all of the non-white children came from mixed families, and only one student was 100% Ghanaian.

In 2009, the school had 75 students.

As of 2013, the school had 90 students originating from 13 countries in years nursery through 10 (age 15), and 15 teachers.

== See also ==
- Education in Ghana
- List of schools in Ghana
