= Ghana-Lebanon Islamic School =

Ghana-Lebanon Islamic School (GLIS)

Location
- Opp. Odaw Railway Station, Kwame Nkrumah Circle; Greater Accra Region; Accra; Ghana; 5.56460°N 0.21987°W

Information
- School type: Primary, Junior high school, Senior high school, Arabic Studies Unit
- Motto: Allah taught man that which he knew not
- Religious affiliation: Islam
- Established: 2000
- Founder: Ghana Islamic Society for Education and Reformation (GISER)
- Status: Active
- School district: Accra Metropolis
- Authority: Ministry of Education
- Oversight: Ghana Education Service
- Principal: Mr. Bala Saad
- Gender: (Boys/Girls)
- Nickname: Gliss
- Website: www.glis.edu.gh

The Ghana-Lebanon Islamic School (GLIS) complex is a private non-profit institution in Accra founded in 2000 and commissioned in May 2001 by the then vice president of Ghana, Aliu Mahama. The school consist of Primary School, Junior High School (JHS), Senior High School (SHS) and an Arabic Studies Unit (ASU).

== History ==
Ghana-Lebanon Islamic School Complex (GLIS) was founded in January 2000 and commissioned on 19 May 2001 by the late Vice President of the Republic of Ghana, Alhaji Aliu Mahama. It started as Ghana-Lebanon Islamic Secondary School (GLISS) with only a few courses before expanding further to include Junior High School and Primary School. The school is owned and managed by the Ghana Islamic Society for Education and Reformation (GISER), a group made up of mainly Lebanese business persons working in Ghana. The school was established as part of GISER's corporate social responsibility.
