= Axim Girls Senior High School =

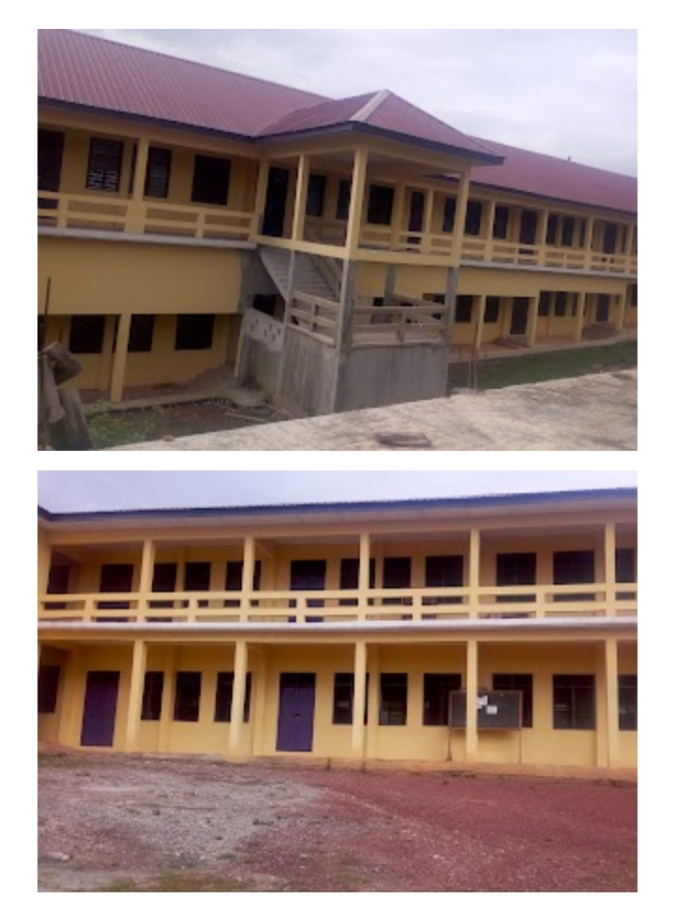

Location
- Axim; Western Region; Axim, Ghana; Ghana; 4°52′21″N 2°14′35″W

Information
- School type: All Girls School
- Motto: Mutans Cum Temporibus (Changing With the Times)
- Established: 2007
- School district: Nzema East
- Oversight: Ministry of Education
- School number: 0040305
- Gender: Girls
- Classes offered: Home Economics, Science, General Arts, Visual Arts

Axim Girls Senior High School is an all-female second cycle institution in Axim in the Western Region of Ghana with a student population of over 800 students

== History ==
The school was established in 2007 by local Axim leaders as a private school and later absorbed into the Ghana Education System in 2010/2011 academic year.

== School code ==
The Ghana Education Service has assigned the code 0040305 for administrative purposes, including student registrations, placements, and national examinations such as the West African Senior School Certificate Examination (WASSCE) to Anlo Senior High School.

== School motto ==
The official motto of Axim Girls Senior High School is 'Mutans Cum Temporibus' which translates to 'Changing With the Times'.

== Academic programs and extra-curricular activities ==
Axim Girls Senior High School like any other senior high school in Ghana functions within the standard three-year Senior High School (SHS) curriculum framework established by Ghana's National Council for Curriculum and Assessment (NaCCA). Currently, Axigis runs five programs which include the following;

- Business
- Home Economics
- Visual Arts
- General Arts
- General Science

== Facilities ==
Axigis has the following facilities;

- ICT Lab
- Classrooms

== Achievements ==
Notable achievements of Axigis include;

- Fourth in netball and soccer and fifth in volleyball out of twelve schools that participated in the 2023 school games held at Nsein.
