= Gambaga Girls Senior High School =

School in Gambaga, Ghana

Location
- Northern Region; Gambaga; Ghana
- Coordinates: 10°31′40″N 0°26′51″W

Information
- School type: All Girls School
- Established: 2008
- Founder: Hajia Alima Mahama
- School district: East Mamprusi District
- Oversight: Ministry of Education
- Gender: Girls
- Classes offered: Home Economics, General Science, General Arts, Visual Arts, Business Accounting, Agricultural Science

Gambaga Girls Senior High School is an all-female second cycle institution in Gambaga in the Northern Region of Ghana.

== History ==
The school was established in 2008 by Hajia Alima Mahama, the then Minister for Women and Children's Affairs.
