= Frazier History Museum =

History museum in Louisville, Kentucky

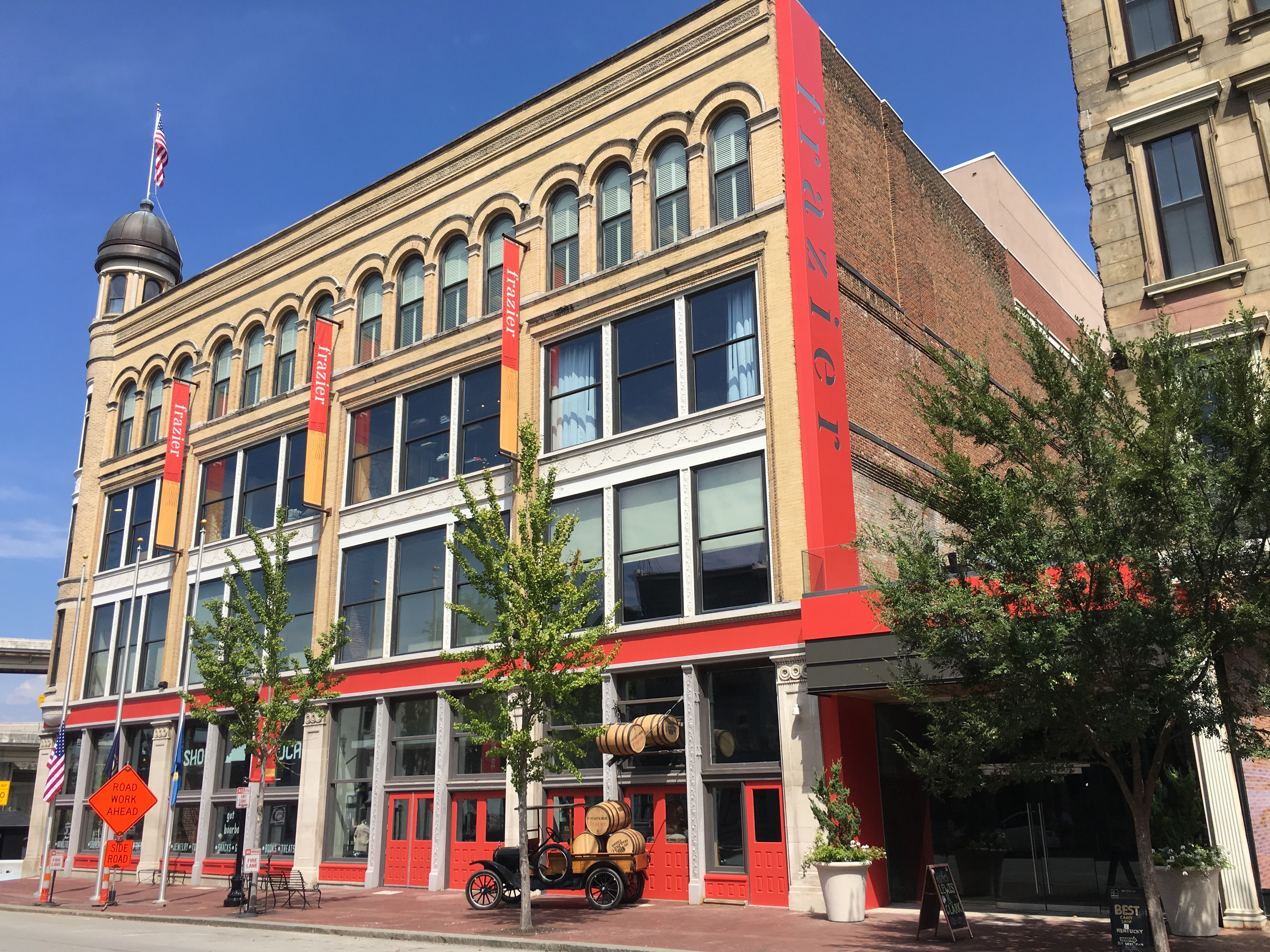
- Former names: Frazier Historical Arms Museum; Frazier International History Museum
- Established: May 22, 2004
- Location: 829 West Main Street; Louisville, Kentucky 40202
- Coordinates: 38.257727°N 85.764519°W
- Type: History
- Founder: Owsley Brown Frazier
- President: Andy Treinen
- Curator: Amanda Briede
- Public transit access: TARC
- Website: fraziermuseum.org

The Frazier History Museum, previously known as the Frazier Historical Arms Museum and the Frazier International History Museum, is a Kentucky history museum located on Museum Row in the West Main District of downtown Louisville, Kentucky.

Founded in 2004 as a museum of historical arms and armor, the Frazier has since expanded its focus. An affiliate of the Smithsonian Institution, the museum preserves and presents Kentucky history through artifacts, exhibitions, educational programs, Bourbon tastings, and guided tours. Subjects of permanent exhibitions include Kentucky history, Kentucky pop culture, Kentucky bourbon whiskey, the Lewis and Clark Expedition, and the Stewart Historic Miniatures Collection. The museum is a non-profit organization funded by private donations.

In 2018, the Frazier became the official starting point of the Kentucky Bourbon Trail.

== History ==
=== Prehistory ===
Owsley Brown Frazier was a wealthy businessman and philanthropist in Louisville. When a tornado struck the city during the 1974 Super Outbreak, it destroyed Frazier's home, and a rare Kentucky long rifle that he owned – a family heirloom made for his great-great-grandfather in Bardstown in the 1820s and gifted to him by his grandfather in 1952 – disappeared. Frazier would never find the rifle, but his search for it would spark a passion for collecting antique weapons.

In 2000, the year he stepped down as vice-chairman of Brown-Forman, Frazier loaned his arms collection to the Kentucky History Center in Frankfort for a special exhibit titled The Weapon As Art. The exhibit ran for two months, but it was attended by about 10,000 people. Inspired by the turnout, Frazier decided to found a museum where he could showcase his private collection on permanent public display.

On May 25, 2001, The Courier-Journal announced the Frazier Historical Arms Museum, a visitor attraction planned for downtown Louisville that was scheduled to open in fall 2002 or spring 2003. The museum was to be located in the building complex at 829 West Main Street, one of the two neighboring properties that Mr. Frazier had recently purchased. In 2002, a website was launched for the Owsley Brown Frazier Historical Arms Museum, an institution whose stated mission was "to acclaim the artistry, craftsmanship, and technological innovation of weapons and their makers."

In February 2003, Mr. Frazier signed a formal agreement entering into a partnership with the Royal Armouries Museum in Leeds, also known as the United Kingdom's National Museum of Arms and Armour, an ancient institution of the Tower of London that was originally founded to manufacture armor for the Kings of England. The agreement outlined plans for the Frazier Museum to borrow and display arms and armament from the Royal Armouries. It was the first time that a British national museum had engaged in an ongoing collaboration with an organization beyond its shores.

Construction on the museum started in 2001 and ended in 2003. Mr. Frazier provided most of the funds for the $32 million project and backed the loans that were taken out to finance the development.

=== Frazier Historical Arms Museum ===
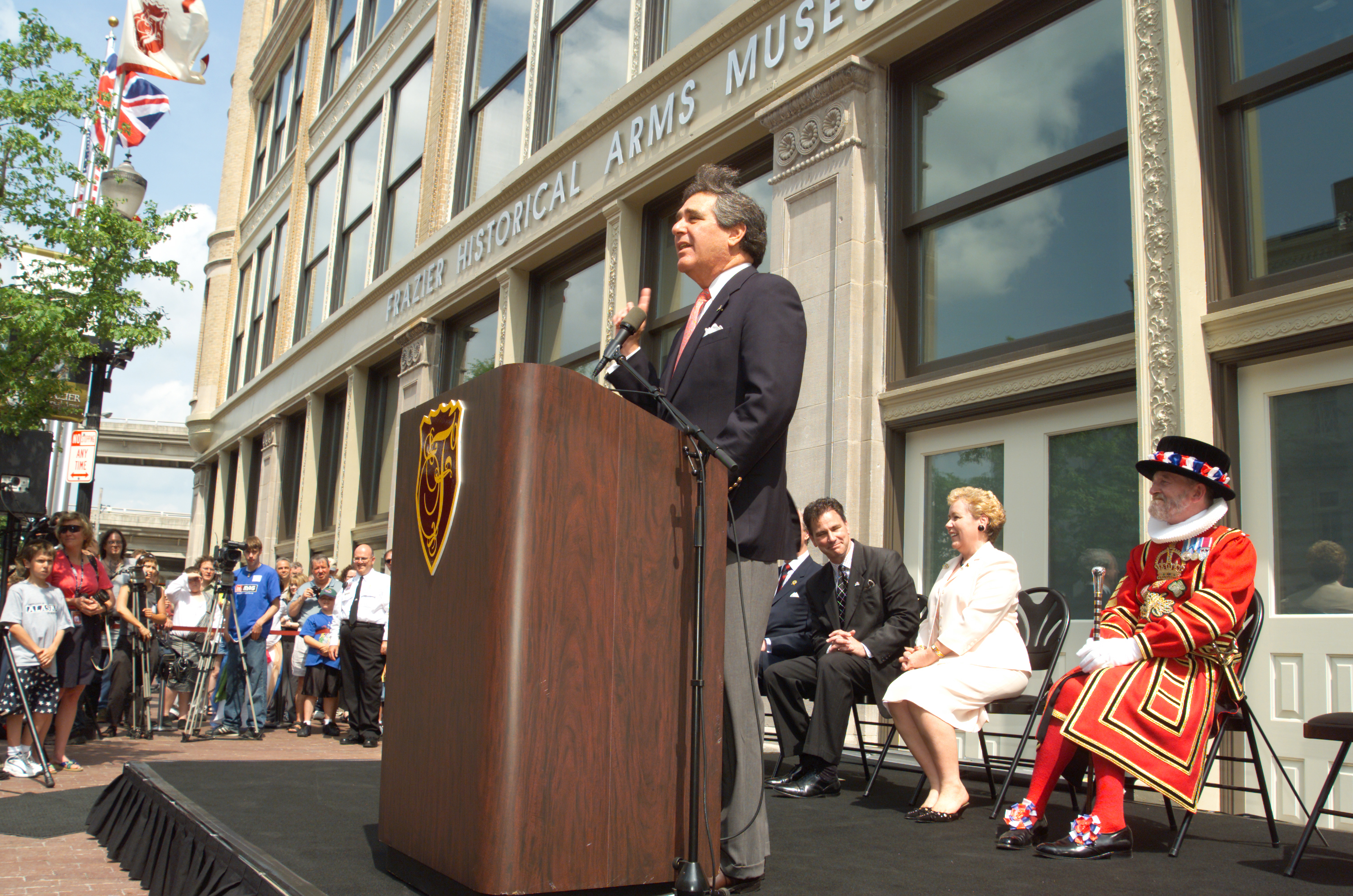
Mayor Jerry Abramson speaks at the opening ceremony, May 22, 2004.

The Frazier Historical Arms Museum opened to the public on May 22, 2004.

The initial collection consisted of roughly 1,500 objects from the personal collection of Owsley Brown Frazier, dating from 1492 to World War I, and approximately 350 objects borrowed from the Royal Armouries, dating from 1066 to the 1960s. Combined the collections included guns, cannons, swords, daggers, arrows, and other historical arms and armor sourced from Flanders, France, Germany, Italy, and the United Kingdom, as well as life-size tableaux of mannequins and horse figures depicting battle scenes from European history.

=== Frazier International History Museum ===
On May 17, 2006, the museum changed its name to the Frazier International History Museum, a nod to the multinational origins of its collection. That year, the museum received another influx of foreign arms and military artifacts from the Royal Armouries. Over time, the museum began to shift its focus away from war and weaponry toward more general topics of state, national, and global history. The permanent collection was gradually de-emphasized as the Frazier moved toward larger, temporary exhibitions.

In August 2010, the Frazier unveiled the Bloedner Monument, a limestone marker that is thought to be the nation's oldest surviving Civil War memorial. Acquired as a long-term loan from the National Cemetery Administration, the historic monument honors the soldiers of the U.S. 32nd Indiana Volunteer Regiment who died at the Battle of Rowlett's Station.

In October 2010, the Frazier introduced a theatrical performance series based on the works of Gothic horror fiction writer Edgar Allan Poe. The series became An Evening With Poe, an annually recurring, week-long Halloween tradition. The performances were adapted and staged by Tony Dingman, Kelly Moore, and Eric Frantz, three of the Frazier's Teaching Artists, and featured live music performed by The Tamerlane Trio.

=== Frazier History Museum ===
In 2011, the museum was renamed the Frazier History Museum.

In May 2012, a bronze sculpture of a Japanese warrior riding horseback into battle by Douwe Blumberg titled Way of Horse and Bow was gifted to the Frazier by actor William Shatner and his wife Elizabeth. In August, the museum's founder and chief benefactor Owsley Brown Frazier died.

The last remaining objects on loan from the Royal Armouries were returned in January 2015.

In 2017, the museum hosted The Hunger Games: The Exhibition, a special exhibition about the dystopian film franchise starring Jennifer Lawrence. Lawrence, a Louisville native, partnered with the Frazier to help promote the exhibition.

Lonely Planet named Kentucky Bourbon Country as one of the top 10 U.S. destinations to visit in 2018 and cited the Frazier Museum as a main attraction. In March 2018, the Frazier sold the first 250 bottles of Final Reserve: James Thompson and Brother Bourbon, a whiskey that had been aged 45 years in the barrel, making it the most mature bourbon ever bottled.

With the opening of the Kentucky Bourbon Trail Welcome Center on August 30, 2018, the Frazier became the official starting point of the Kentucky Bourbon Trail, a project launched in 1999 by the Kentucky Distillers' Association to promote bourbon tourism in the state.

In November 2019, the tenth and final season of An Evening With Poe wrapped. During the course of the program's ten-year run, the Frazier's staff adapted a total of 33 of Poe's works, including poems, short stories, plays, and a novel. According to Dr. Hal Poe, a former president of The Poe Foundation and living relative of Edgar Allan Poe, the Frazier has staged and performed more of Poe's works than anyone in the world.

== Building ==
Located on Museum Row in the Bourbon District of downtown Louisville, the museum occupies a late 19th century, Chicago-style commercial structure of 100,000 square feet that was originally called the "Doerhoefer Building".

=== The site's history ===
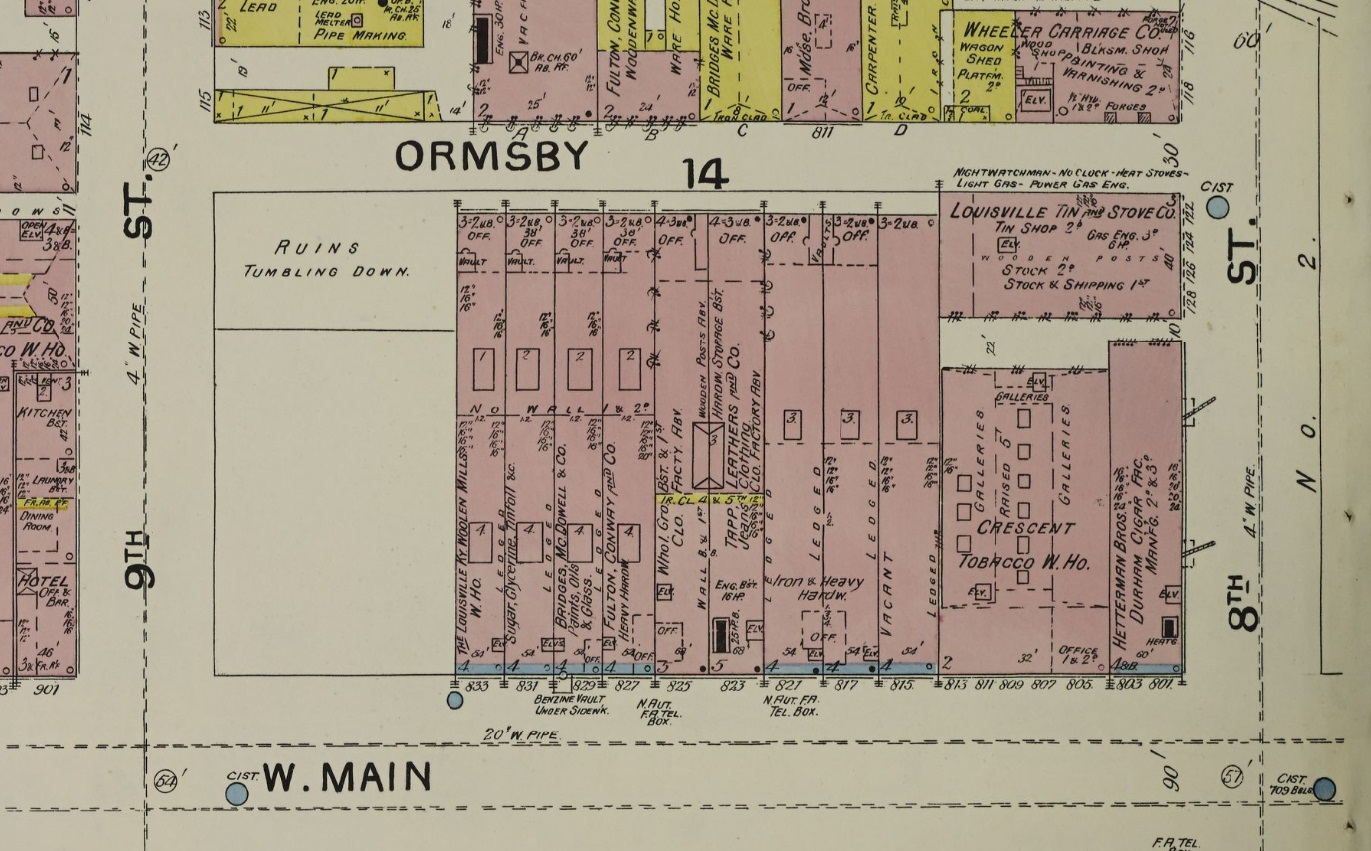
A fire insurance map from 1892 records "ruins tumbling down" on the northwest corner of the property.

As river-based commerce and trade fueled Louisville's early growth following its settlement in 1779, West Main Street became the first street established by residents.

Because of its close proximity to Main Street and the Ohio River, the intersection of Ninth and Main Streets came to serve important commercial purposes. A tobacco warehouse built at the northeast corner of the intersection began operating in the 1850s. The firm of Meguiar, Harris & Co. managed the so-called 9th Street Tobacco Warehouse until the 1890s.

On March 27, 1890, a tornado measuring F4 on the Fujita scale visited Louisville, carving a path from the Parkland neighborhood to Crescent Hill. Labeled "the whirling tiger of the air" by The Courier-Journal, the tornado killed an estimated 76 to 120 people and destroyed 766 buildings, one of which was the 9th Street Tobacco Warehouse.

A rapid reconstruction effort led to the building of more cast-iron façades along West Main between Sixth and Ninth Streets – in all, what would amount to the second-largest number of cast-iron façades in the country behind SoHo in New York.

A small article published in the March 23, 1897, issue of The Courier-Journal announced that John Doerhoefer, the president of National Tobacco Works, would build "four handsome business houses at Ninth and Main Streets" on the site of the old 9th Street Tobacco Warehouse.

=== Architecture ===
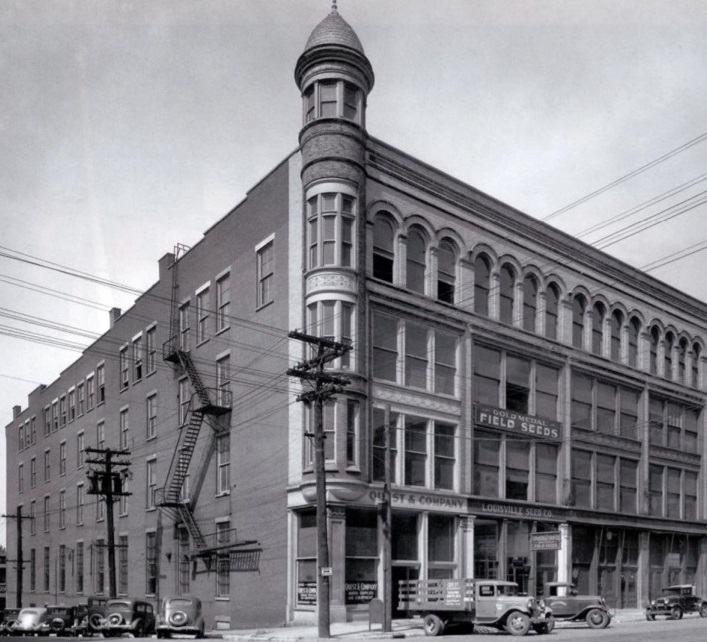
A 1936 photo shows the original cupola, which would be gone by 1966.

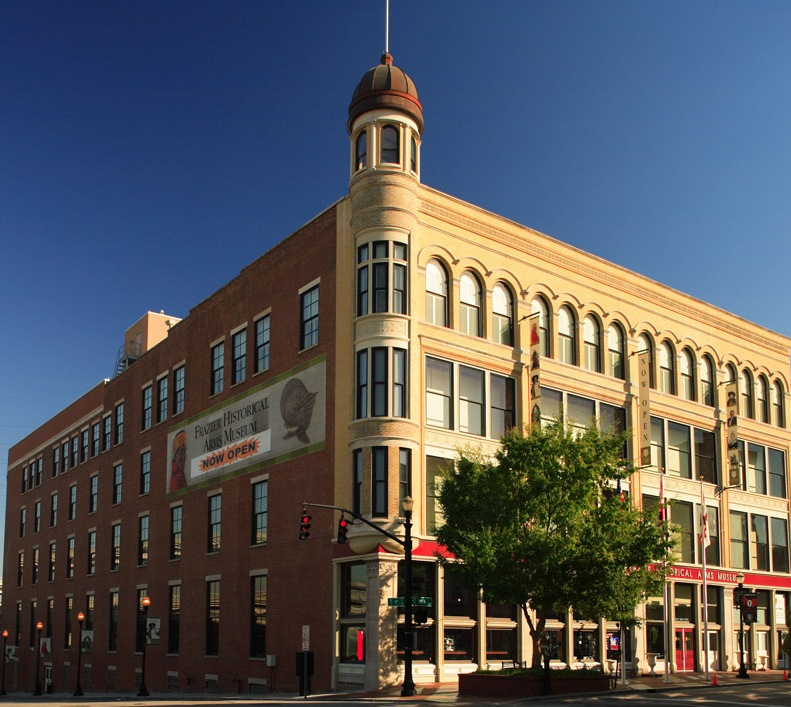
A 2005 photo shows the new cupola, installed November 7, 2003.

Mr. Doerhoefer hired D. X. Murphy and Bros., the architectural firm that two years earlier had designed the iconic Twin Spires atop the grandstand at Churchill Downs, to draw the plans. It was to be made of brick, stone, and iron with a tower at the corner.

Established in 1898 and built of cast iron and yellow-buff brick, the Doerhoefer Building was actually built as a complex of four adjoining buildings with common walls and a single façade. The structure spans four typical Main Street fronts (827–833) before it rounds the corner of Ninth Street with an oriel topped with a cornice roof.

Each façade is separated by pilasters with simple ornamentation. Machine-made festoons decorate the horizontal bandcourse which divides each major section between the second and third floors. Windows on the fourth floor are separated by brick pilasters with stone capitals, which continue into arches of radiating bricks with some trim.

Much of the original stone ornamentation has gone missing.

=== Ox Breeches ===
In 1900, Ox Breeches Manufacturing Company began operating a garment factory in the Doerhoefer complex. The self-proclaimed "largest producer of pants in America," the firm employed some 350 workers at the factory – 25 men, the rest women and girls.

On April 7, 1905, the day its contract with the union was set to expire, the firm announced three imminent changes: first, it would henceforth run the factory as an open shop; second, the 10% pay raise the workers had won upon unionizing in 1903 would be repealed; and third, the length of the work week would be extended from 54 to 60 hours. In response, 250 of the workers walked out and unanimously voted to go on strike. Over the summer, 106 of the strikers sued Ox Breeches for damages and back pay, claiming they had been blacklisted by the company managers. In December, a judge ruled for the defendant in what has been called "a decision of importance, both to organized labor and to capitalists."

During the night of January 6, 1916, a fire broke out on the third or fourth floor of the Ox Breeches factory, causing large scale damage. The story was reported in newspapers from Connecticut to Hawaii, including in Cincinnati's German language paper. The fire completely destroyed the building at 825 West Main Street, leaving a vacant space at what is now the site of the Frazier's vestibule and outdoor park. A Louisville Metro government history of the Louisville Fire Department calls the event "the first major recorded fire in the early 20th century."

Charring is still visible on some of the timber joists on the southeast side of the building.

=== Renovations ===
In 2001, when Mr. Frazier purchased the complex, he had much of the interior gutted and rebuilt. A copper-topped cupola was installed on the crest of the structure's southwest corner, as the original cupola had been removed sometime between 1936 and 1966.

In 2012, a $700,000 renovation project, funded through grants and public contributions, expanded the museum's exhibit space from 2,700 to 7,500 square feet. The Frazier also purchased 821 West Main Street, a neighboring, four-story brick building of 18,000 square feet.

In 2018, the museum opened a new vestibule and an outdoor park designed by landscape artist Jon Carloftis.

== Layout ==
=== Basement ===
Objects in the museum's permanent collection are kept in storage in the basement when not on display. Offices and work spaces for security personnel and employees of the collections and exhibits departments are located in the basement.

=== First floor ===
==== Exterior ====
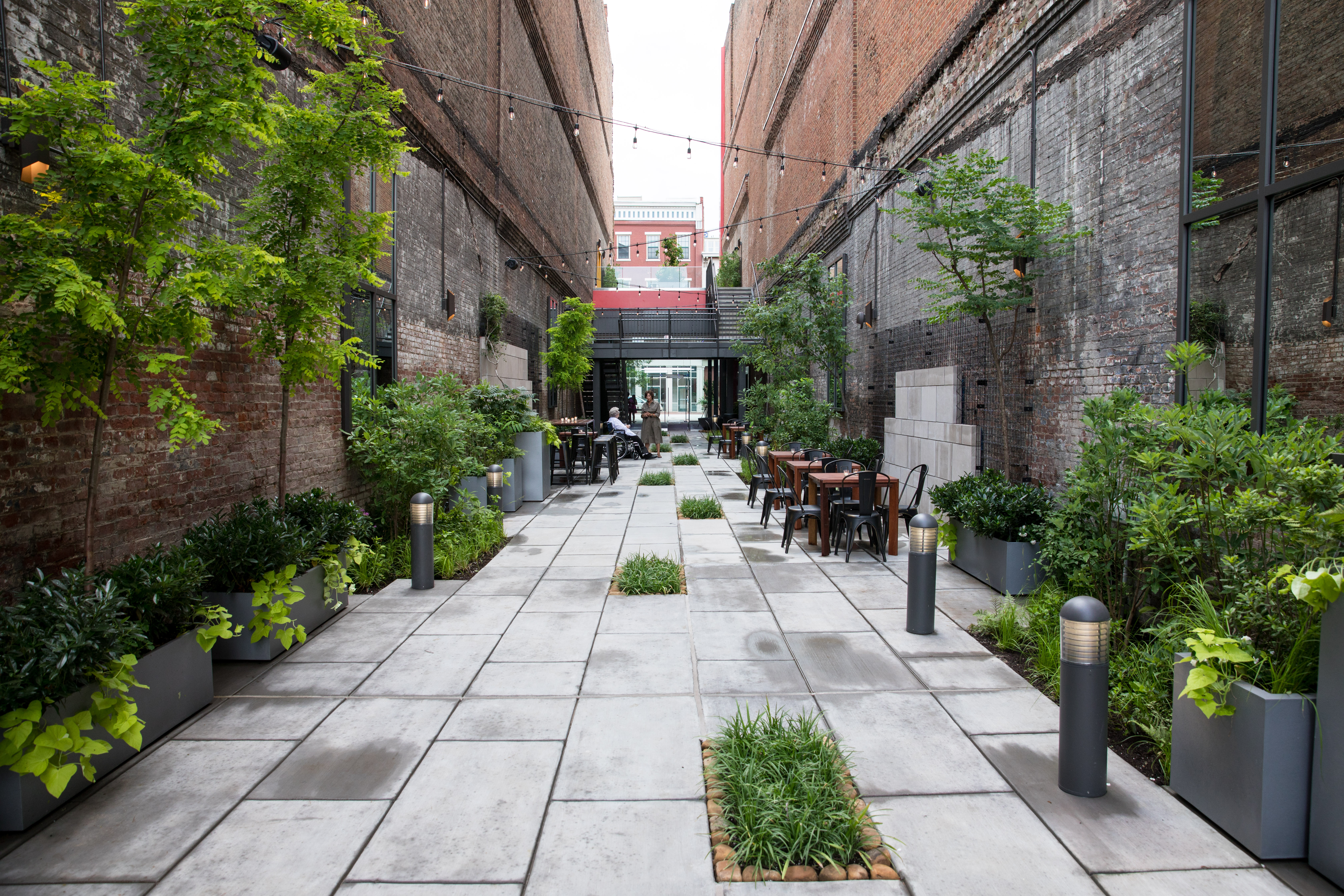
Ghost ferns and other native Kentucky flora line the park.

In 2018, the Frazier opened the Gateway Garden, a public park situated at 825 West Main between the museum and the neighboring brick structure to its east.

The park is bordered to the south by the vestibule and to the north by a rolling steel gate on Washington Street. It consists of a linear courtyard populated with native Kentucky plants and furnished with wooden furniture. A staircase at the south end of the courtyard leads to a second-story rooftop garden with a balcony overlooking Main Street.

==== Interior ====
Visitors can enter the Frazier from either Main Street or Washington Street. Both points of entry lead to the Cube, a glass vestibule with a front entrance facing Main Street.

Attached to the Cube is the Kentucky Bourbon Trail Welcome Center, a facility that houses the museum's admissions desk. The Kentucky Bourbon Trail Welcome Center abuts the Museum Store, which is located in the southwest corner of the building.

The Great Hall, a large atrium with a sweeping terrazzo staircase, occupies the center of the building. Mounted along its perimeter are low-slung cases featuring highlights from The Stewart Collection organized by theme: "Introduction," "Local Connection," "Events as They Happened," "Evolution of Toy Soldiers," "Not Just Toy Soldiers," and "Why Napoleonic?" Southwest of the Great Hall is the Marshall Charitable Foundation Education Center, a classroom where visiting students learn history through hands-on activities.

The north wing (1 North) houses large, temporary exhibitions, as well as the Brown-Forman Theater, a 120-seat auditorium used for live interpretations of historical events. Alcoves of the Great Hall, 1 East and 1 West, are used for smaller, temporary exhibits.

=== Second floor ===
2 South contains The Charles W. Stewart Historic Miniatures Gallery and The German Gallery, which together house hundreds of the sets of toy soldiers and historical miniatures from The Stewart Collection that are on public display, as well as an adjacent gallery. Low-slung cases around the second floor's perimeter include "Revolutionary War," "Civil War," and "World War II."

2 West is a champagne parlor with a bar, Victorian furniture, and Southern Exposition. The mezzanine houses The Founder's Gallery. 2 North is reserved for temporary exhibitions.

=== Third floor ===
3 South houses The Spirit of Kentucky exhibition. 3 North houses The Lewis and Clark Experience.

=== Fourth floor ===
4 North contains a boardroom and offices for the museum staff. 4 South contains an expansive, New York-style loft with a wooden dance floor, dimmable track lighting, and brick walls lined with 25 windows with shutters.

=== Rooftop ===
The rooftop garden features seasonal blooming flowers and looks out across the Ohio River.

== Collection ==
The permanent collection features a wide array of historically significant arms, artifacts of war, and other objects of American, American Indian, Asian, and European origin, most of which were donated to the museum by its founder.

=== Historical arms ===
Among the oldest firearms in the museum's permanent collection are a Netherlandish or South German snap matchlock target rifle, c. 16th century; a German sporting crossbow, c. 17th century; and an Austrian wheellock rifle, c. 18th century. Other early model firearms include a variety of rifles and handguns made by Collier, Colt, Winchester, Remington, Smith & Wesson, and Marlin during the 19th century.

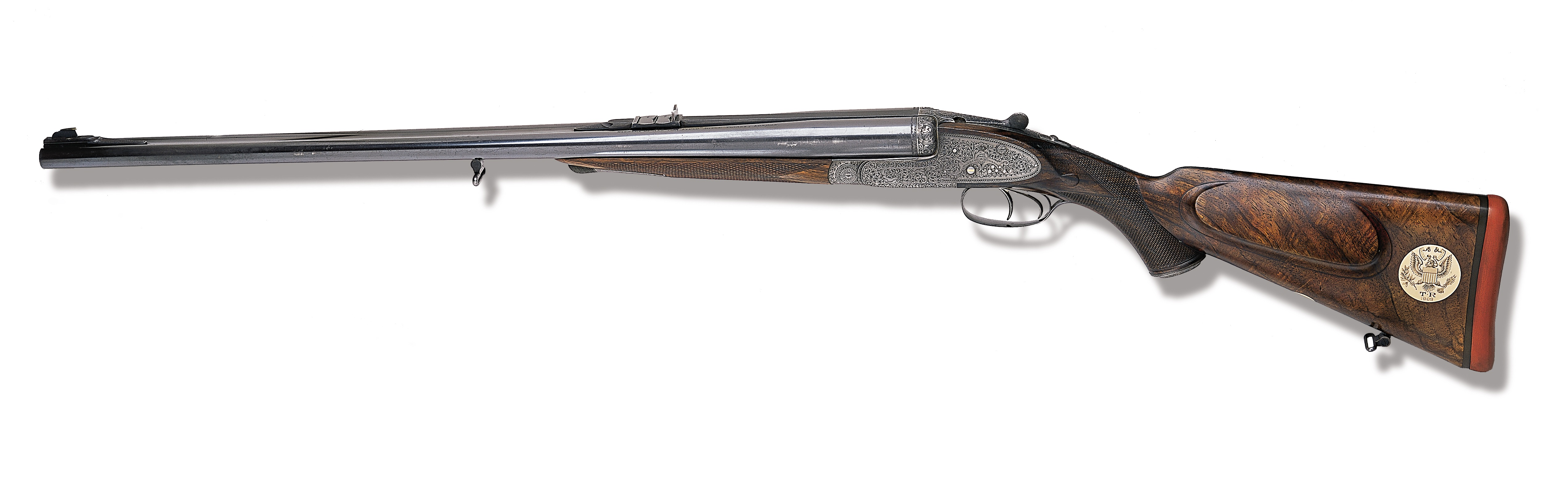
Holland & Holland, Ltd. Royal Grade Double Rifle ("The Big Stick"), presented to Theodore Roosevelt, 1908.

One of the museum's best-known artifacts is a 1908 Holland & Holland, Ltd. Royal Grade Double Rifle that belonged to President Theodore Roosevelt. In January 1909, conservationist Edward North Buxton, together with a group of 55 British zoologists and hunting enthusiasts, presented it to Roosevelt, his personal friend, who then used it to hunt elephant, buffalo, and rhinoceros during a year-long safari in Africa. The rifle has since acquired the modern, unofficial nickname of "The Big Stick," from Roosevelt's famous quote, "speak softly and carry a big stick," derived from a West African proverb.

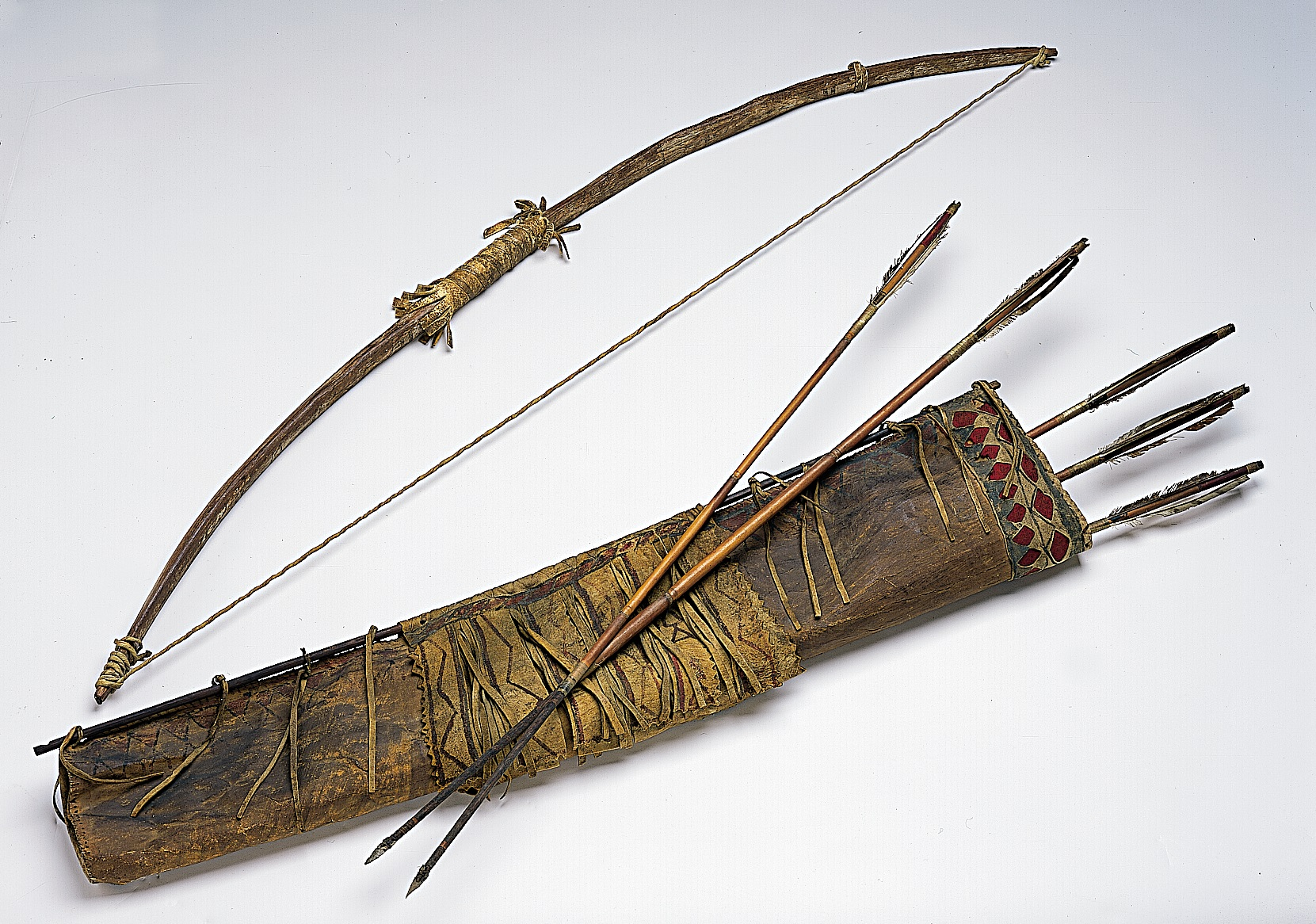
Self bow and quiver with arrows, attributed to Geronimo, 19th c.

Other arms of notable provenance include Buffalo Bill's lever-action rifle, George Armstrong Custer's ivory-gripped pistols, George Washington's flintlock hunting rifle, Geronimo's bow and quiver of arrows, the James–Younger Gang's revolvers, Josiah Bartlett's saber and scabbard, and a half-stock percussion rifle made by Meshek "Mose" Moxley, a gunsmith who had escaped slavery via the Underground Railroad.

Most of the weapons at the Frazier were either manufactured or owned by veterans of American or European military conflicts, including the French and Indian War, the American Revolution, the War of the Second Coalition, the Anglo-Russian invasion of Holland, the Seminole Wars, the Texas Revolution, the Creek Alabama Uprising, the Mexican–American War, the Apache Wars, the Crimean War, the Sioux Wars, and the American Civil War.

=== Other artifacts ===
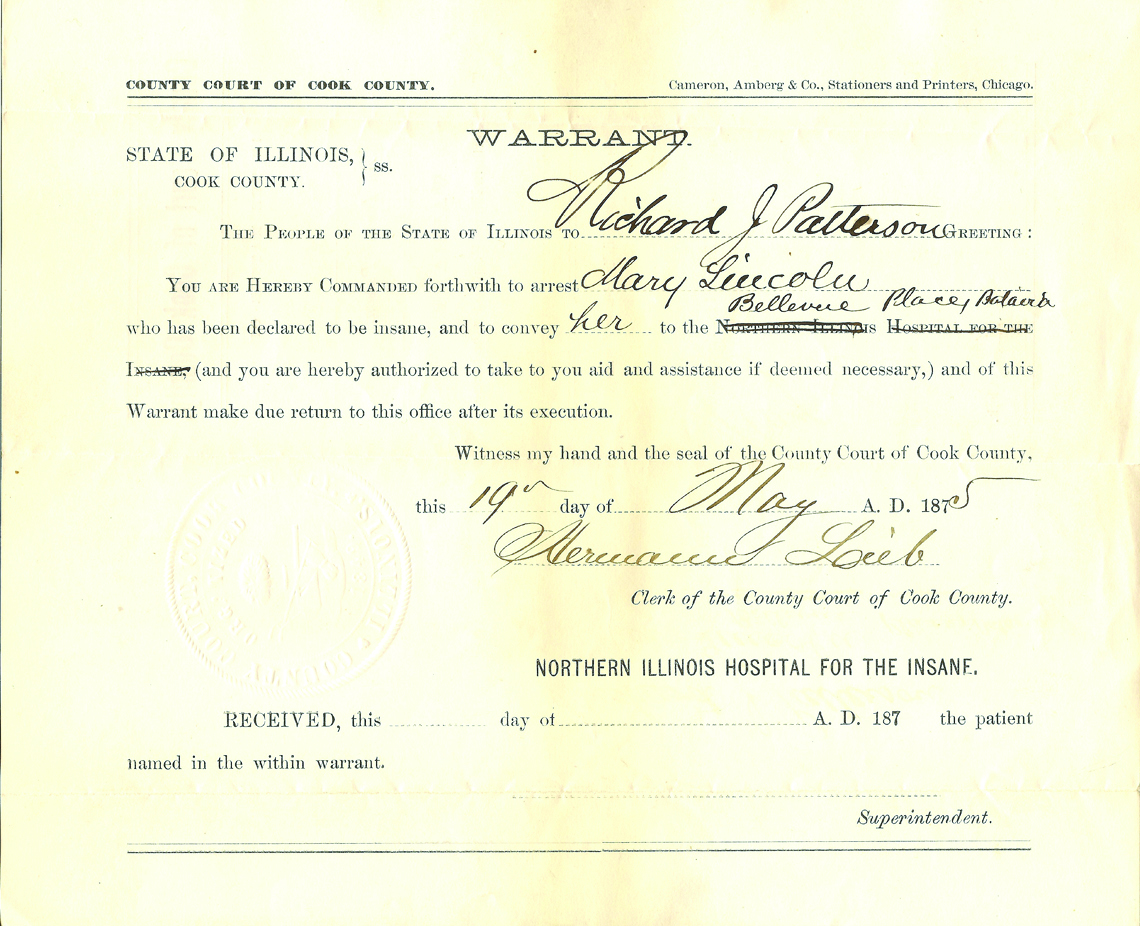
Arrest warrant issued for Mary Todd Lincoln dated May 19, 1875.

Artifacts of the American Civil War include the First National Confederate Flag, which was likely carried into the Battle of Seven Pines.

American Indian Wars artifacts include beaded apparel designed for Cheyenne, Lakota Sioux, or Shoshone Indians employed as scouts by the U.S. Army and a surplus marble grave marker from the Battle of Little Bighorn.

Asian and European artifacts include a battle helmet modified for the Gioco del Ponte games in medieval Italy, a Japanese jingasa, Samurai suits of armor, and Schützenfest targets.

Among the rare and noteworthy books, documents, and artworks on display are the arrest warrant issued for Mary Todd Lincoln, who was declared "insane" in 1875 and institutionalized; the Boone family bible, a first edition copy of Uncle Tom's Cabin, and an oil painting of Geronimo by Elbridge Ayer Burbank, the only artist for whom the Apache resistance leader ever sat.

Other objects in the permanent collection include ammunition, clothes, dolls, furniture, helmets, jewelry, military uniforms, miniatures, musical instruments, photographs, postcards, statues, textiles, tools, and toys.

== Exhibitions ==
=== Permanent exhibitions ===
==== The Founder's Gallery ====
This exhibition commemorates Owsley Brown Frazier, the museum's founder, with a cast of historically significant artifacts, arms, and implements of warfare drawn from the permanent collection.

==== The Spirit of Kentucky ====
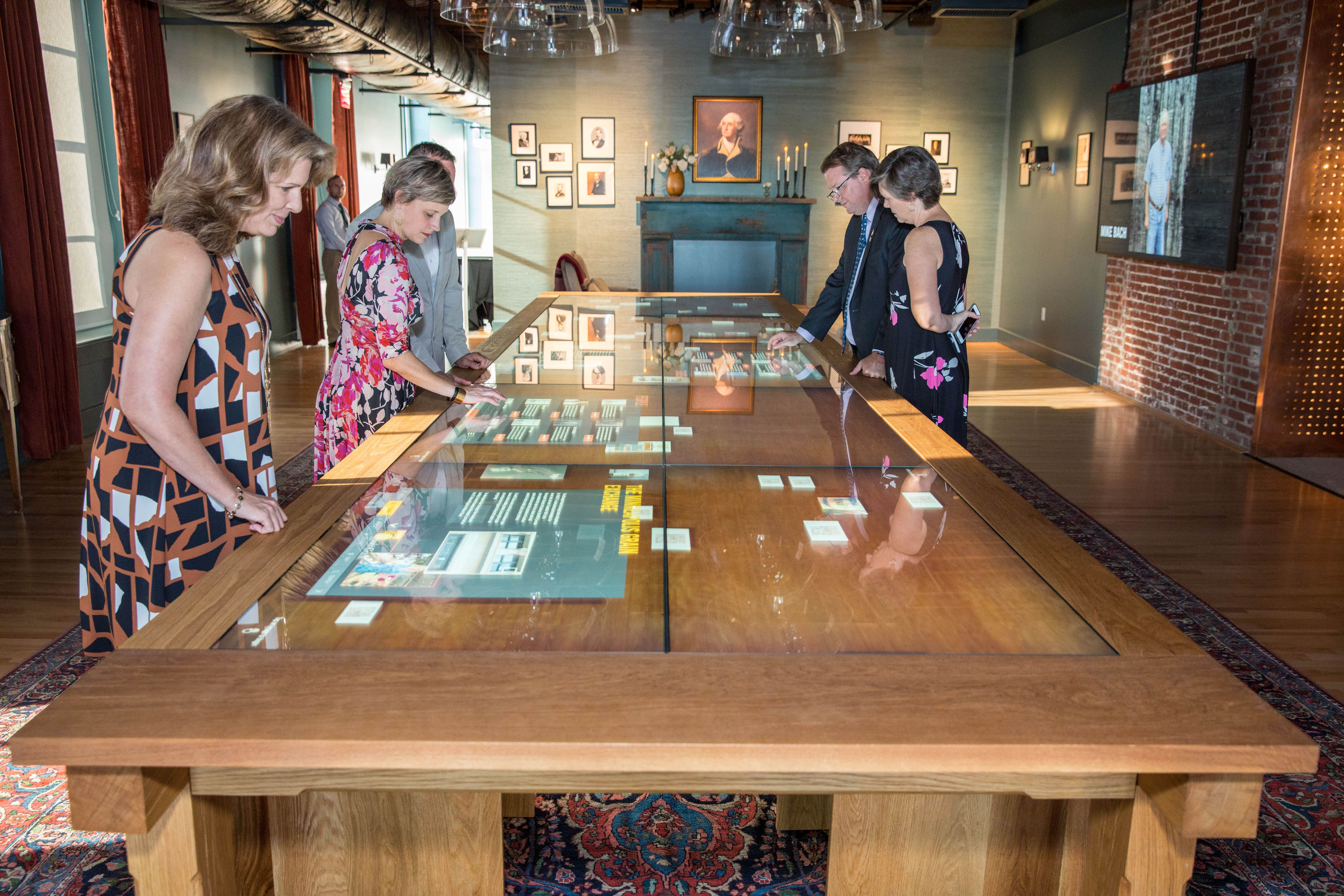
A digital library of bourbon-related content resides within a dinner table in The Spirit of Kentucky.

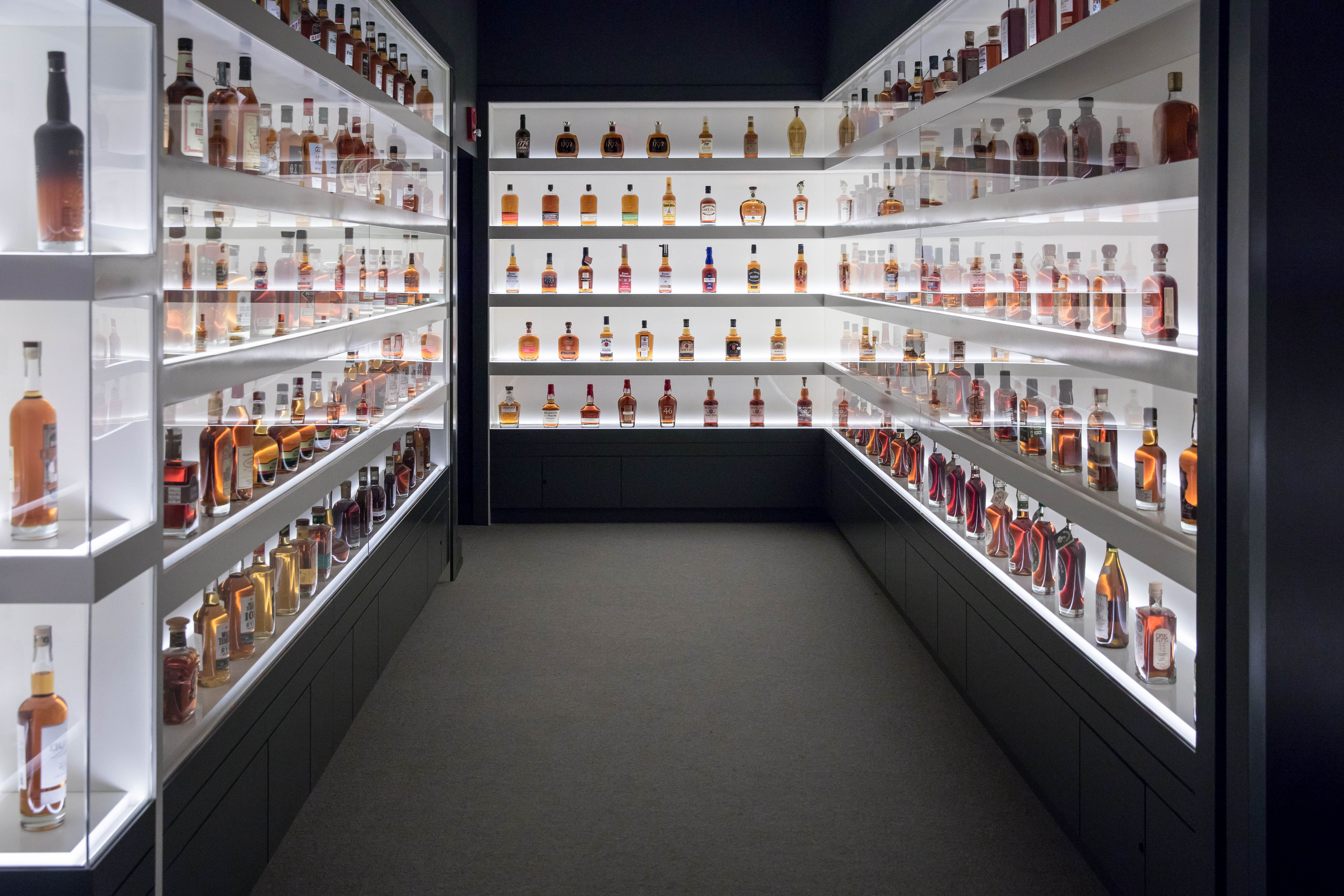
The Bottle Hall will showcase every brand of bourbon currently produced in the state of Kentucky.

A visual guide to the history, craft, and culture of bourbon whiskey, The Spirit of Kentucky exhibition divides into three themed rooms: "Enchanted" looks at how the mix of limestone, water, grain crops, and white oak trees in Kentucky lends itself to the production of bourbon, "Gracious" celebrates the camaraderie of bourbon distillers and proprietors, and "Refined" examines the culture of bourbon consumers and collectors.

Visitors enter through a covered bridge and exit through the Bottle Hall, a corridor stocked with a growing collection of bottles that will ultimately include every brand of bourbon being produced in Kentucky.

==== The Stewart Collection ====
According to Old Toy Soldier, The Charles W. Stewart Historic Miniatures Collection constitutes "one of the finest collections of rare historic toy soldiers on permanent public display in the world today." Originally donated in 2011, the collection has grown substantially in the years since. As of 2019, the collection consists of about 30,000 figurines, vehicles, and accessories, over 10,000 of which are currently on display, and represents approximately 170 different makers, including Barclay, Courtenay, Heinrichsen, Heyde, Lucotte, Märklin, Mignot, M.I.M., Vertunni, and W. Britain.

Dioramas in the collection depict scenes from the Punic Wars, the Germanic Wars, the Crusades, the Frankokratia, the Hundred Years' War, the Mongol Yoke, the Anglo-Scottish Wars, the American Indian Wars, the American Revolution, the French Revolution, the Napoleonic Wars, the Mexican–American War, the American Civil War, the Franco-Prussian War, the Montenegrin-Ottoman War, the Anglo-Zulu War, the Boer Wars, the Mahdist War, the Anglo-Egyptian War, the Spanish–American War, the Russo-Japanese War, World War I, and World War II.

==== The Lewis and Clark Experience ====
This immersive exhibition simulates the Lewis and Clark Expedition, a journey undertaken by the U.S. Army's Corps of Discovery from 1804 to 1806 with the mission of gathering scientific and commercial information about the flora, fauna, and geography of the territory within and northwest of the newly acquired Louisiana Purchase.

=== Special exhibitions ===
==== Southern Exposition ====
A champagne parlor in 2 West doubles as an event space and exhibit about the Southern Exposition, an annual, civic convention in Louisville modeled after the World's Fair which ran from 1883 – when President Chester A. Arthur presided over the inaugural opening ceremony – to 1887.

==== West of Ninth: Race, Reckoning, & Reconciliation ====
This exhibit focuses on the historic roots and history of Louisville's racial inequality and segregation, exemplified by the Ninth Street divide, with the area west of Ninth Street in downtown Louisville being known colloquially as the West End and associated with the African-American community. The exhibit delves into issues of race, segregation and redlining in the city. Originally scheduled to open during the first week of protests that erupted in Louisville over the police killing of Breonna Taylor, the exhibit explores how these historic factors have contributed to the ongoing protests and race relations in Louisville.

West of Ninth: Race, Reckoning, & Reconciliation features artifacts excavated in Corn Island Archaeology's exploration of historic Black neighborhood Beecher Terrace, as well as other objects related to Black history in Louisville and the ongoing protests, alongside selections from the "West of Ninth" blog, originally created by guest curators Walt and Shae Smith, which was used as the basis for the exhibit.

== Notable past exhibitions ==
- British Royal Armouries USA, May 22, 2004 – January 19, 2015. With over 300 European artifacts borrowed from the Royal Armouries Museum in Leeds dating from 1066 to the 1960s, this exhibition featured antique guns, arrows, swords, muskets, and other historical arms and armor from Flanders, France, Germany, Italy, and the United Kingdom, as well as life-size tableaux of mannequins and horse figures depicting battle scenes from European history.
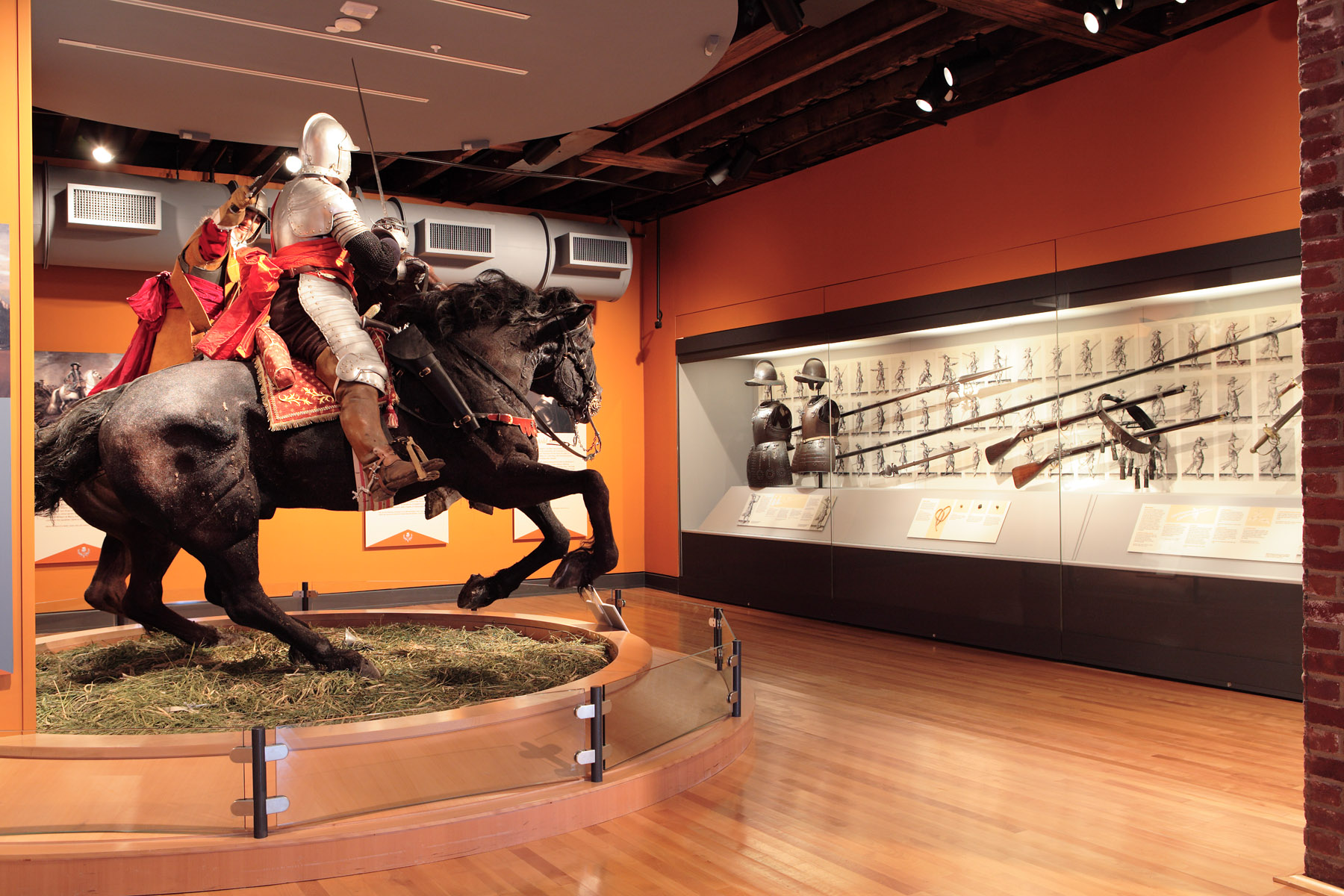
  Antique pole arms in British Royal Armouries USA, April 23, 2006.
- Water Works, October 23, 2010 – May 1, 2011. This history of the Louisville Water Company tracked the city's evolution from "Graveyard of the West," a nickname it earned in the 1800s when its sewage-contaminated wells spread cholera and typhoid, to winning "Best Tasting Tap Water in America" in 2008.
- Da Vinci: The Genius, May 14 – September 18, 2011. Featuring a glider, a helicopter, a machine gun, a model of the “ideal city,” a movie camera, a parachute, a tank, SCUBA gear, and other full-scale machines reproduced from his personal notebooks, this traveling exhibition celebrated Leonardo da Vinci.
- Samurai, May 12 – September 30, 2012. An exploration of the arts and philosophy of the military nobility of medieval and early modern Japan, this exhibition included armor, arms, artworks, religious icons, textiles, and other artifacts of Samurai culture from a period spanning 1,500 years.
- Diana: A Celebration, September 15, 2012 – January 13, 2013. This retrospective on the life and humanitarian work of Diana, Princess of Wales, featured more than 150 of her belongings, including her royal wedding gown, 28 designer dresses, jewels, rare home movies, and personal mementos.
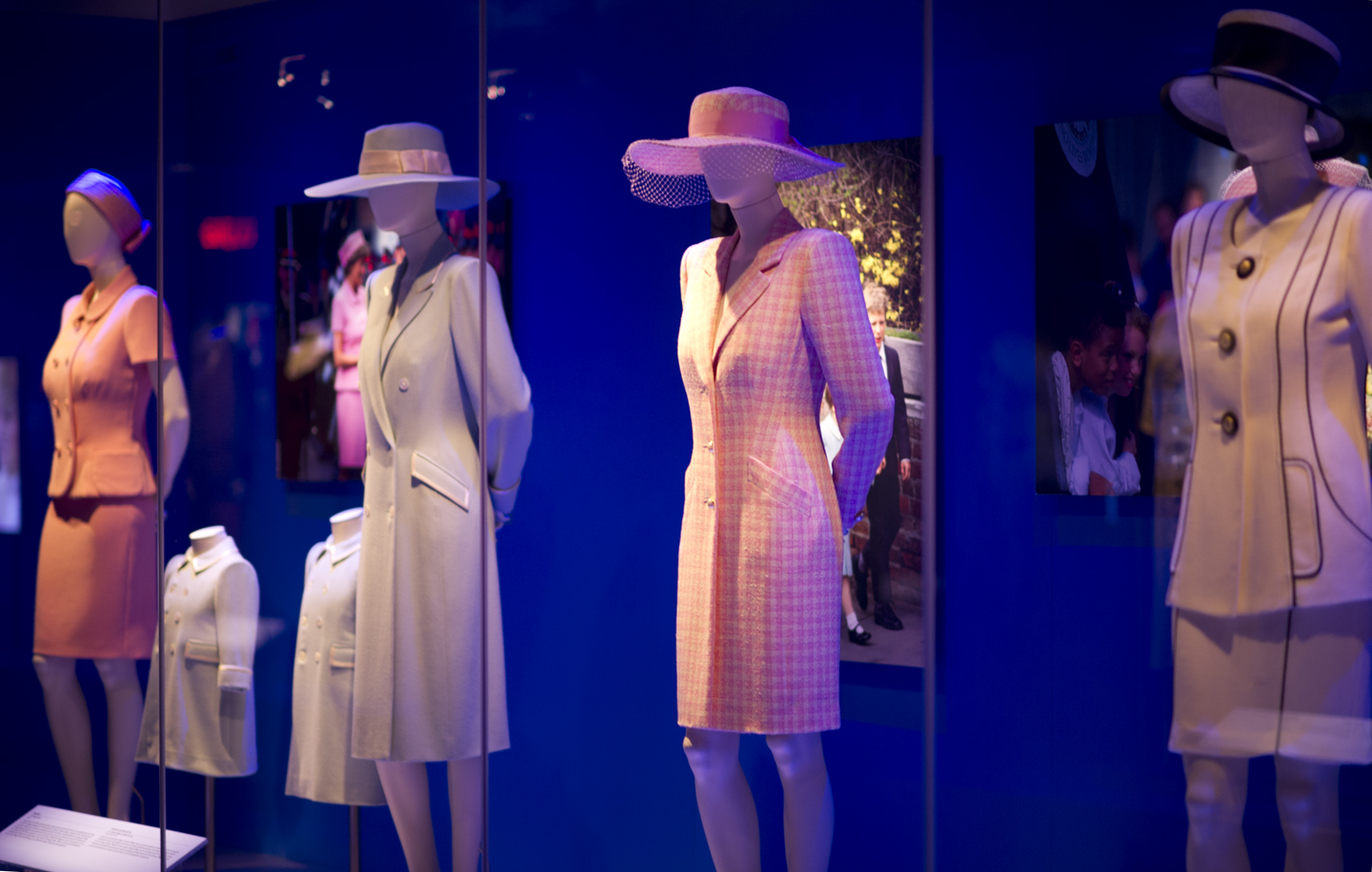
  Original garments in Diana: A Celebration, December 4, 2012.
- Spirits of the Passage: The Story of the Transatlantic Slave Trade, February 2 – June 16, 2013. Produced in partnership with the Mel Fisher Maritime Heritage Museum, this exhibition displayed nearly 150 artifacts salvaged from the Henrietta Marie, an English slave ship that sank off the coast of Florida in 1700.
- Mythic Creatures, May 11 – September 15, 2013. Featuring pre-historic fossils, textiles, paintings, stone carvings, wooden sculptures, and other cultural artifacts, this exhibition on cryptozoology looked at the origins of dragons, kraken, mermaids, Pegasus, phoenixes, unicorns, and other mythic creatures.
- Spirits of the Bluegrass: Prohibition and Kentucky, October 29, 2015 – January 9, 2018. Featuring two full bars and a lighted stage, this exhibition explored the unintended consequences of Prohibition by tracing the rise of the temperance movement, bootleggers, speakeasies, and flappers during the 1920s and '30s.
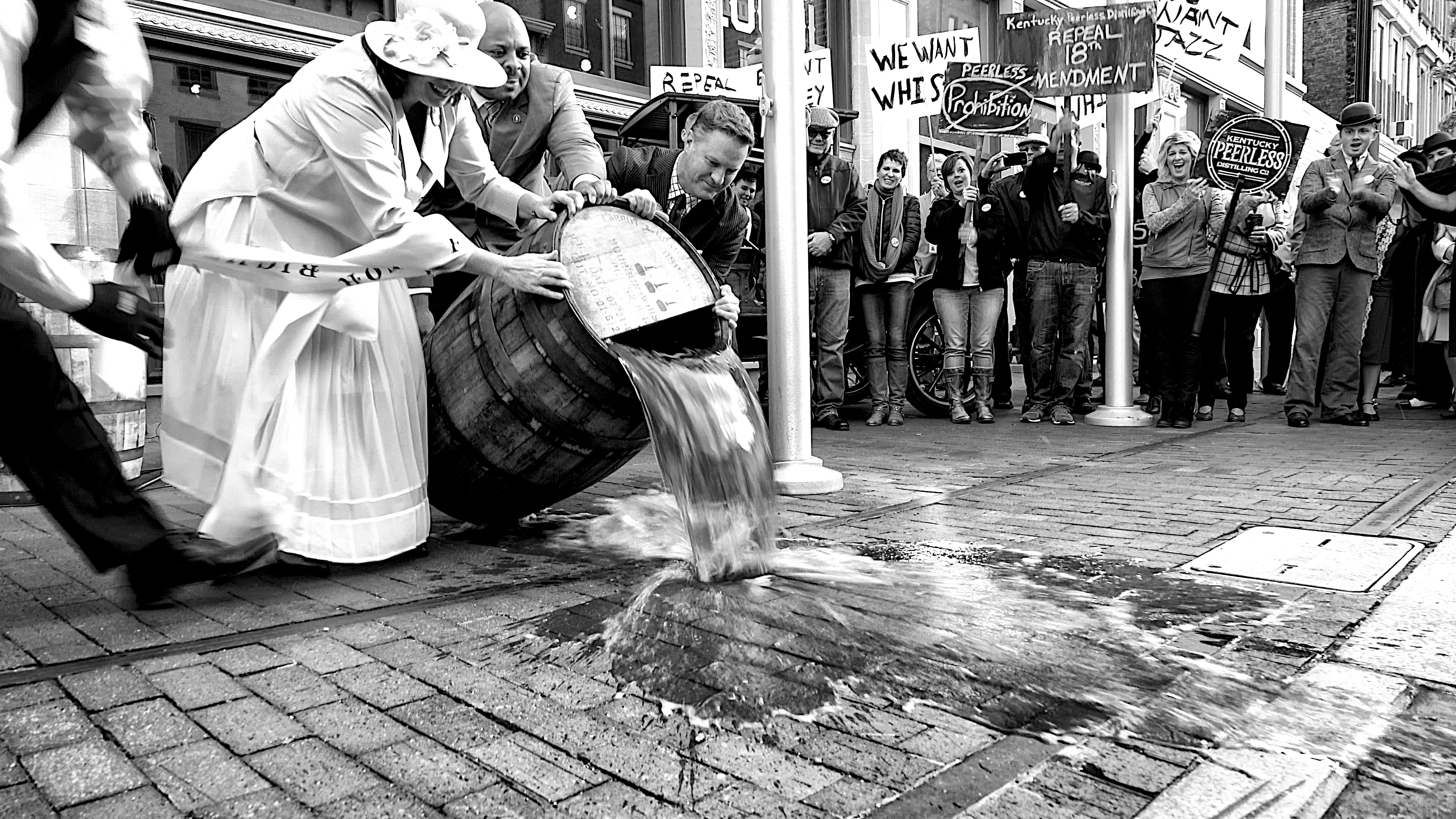
- Bourbon dumped to open Spirits of the Bluegrass, October 29, 2015.
  The Hunger Games: The Exhibition, April 1 – September 10, 2017. This exhibition explored the dystopian film franchise The Hunger Games (in which the lead character is portrayed by Louisville native Jennifer Lawrence) with set recreations and original maps, props, and costumes, including the Girl on Fire dress, the Mockingjay pin, and Katniss's bow.
- Magnificent Mona Bismarck, March 15 – July 29, 2018. This retrospective on 1930s style icon Mona Bismarck featured garments, hats, shoes, and jewelry designed by Cristóbal Balenciaga, Elsa Schiaparelli, Emilio Pucci, Fulco di Verdura, Hubert de Givenchy, Madeleine Vionnet, and Roger Vivier.

== Interpretations ==
A staff of costumed actors known as teaching artists writes and stages live interpretations at the Frazier. The performances cover a breadth of historical material dating from the Middle Ages to the 1930s.

Subjects of performances have included legends of Norse mythology and English folklore, the trial of Joan of Arc, the execution of Anne Boleyn, the Golden Age of Piracy, the reign of Catherine the Great, the Whiskey Rebellion, the Burning of Washington, the Blackburn race riots, the sinking of CSS Alabama, the founding of the Girl Scouts of the USA, and the kidnapping of an Oklahoma oil tycoon by Kathryn and Machine Gun Kelly.

Stories relayed as firsthand accounts have included a sailmaker's captivity aboard HMS Jersey, a surveyor's incursions into Shawnee hunting grounds, a sharpshooter's missions in the Peninsular War, a riverboat gambler's card games aboard the Kansas Pacific Railway, and a Louisville seamstress's achievements in bridal wear.

== Selected objects ==
Selected highlights from The Stewart Collection

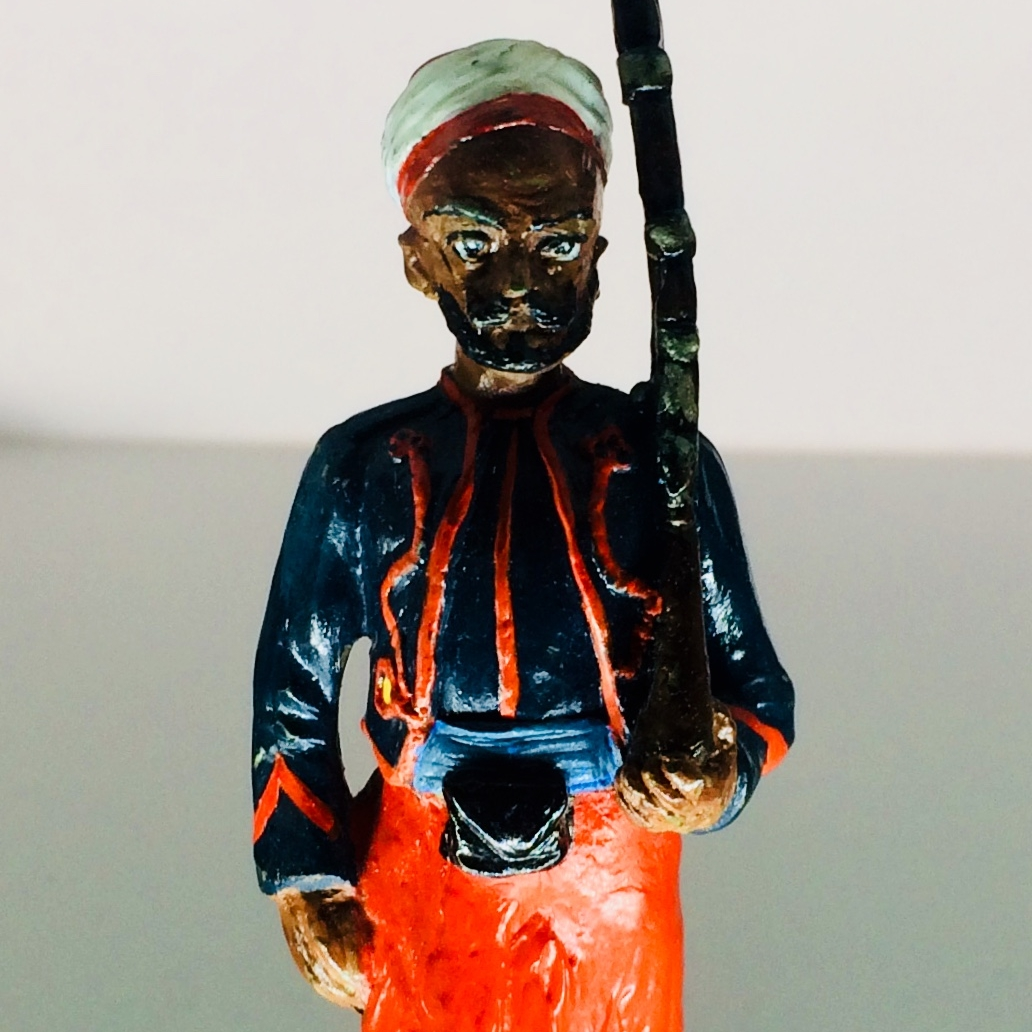
Lineol, Germany, French Algerian Soldier

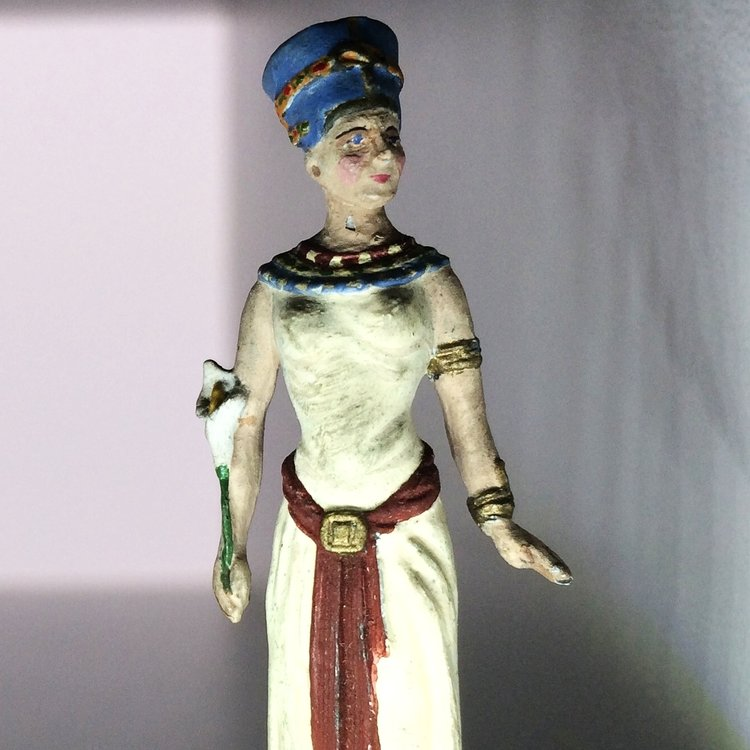
Courtenay, United Kingdom, Queen Nefertiti

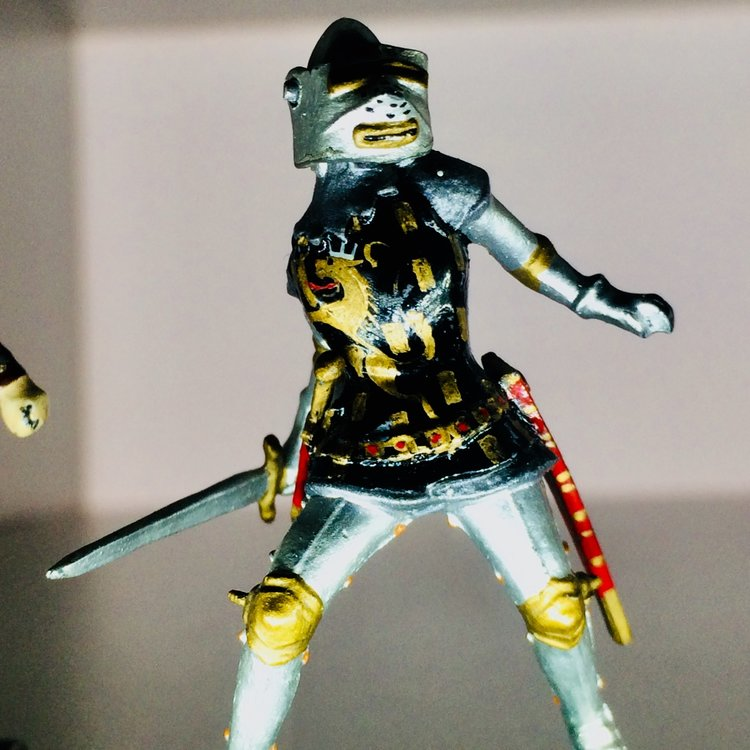
Courtenay, United Kingdom, Thierry d'Aufay le Hardi

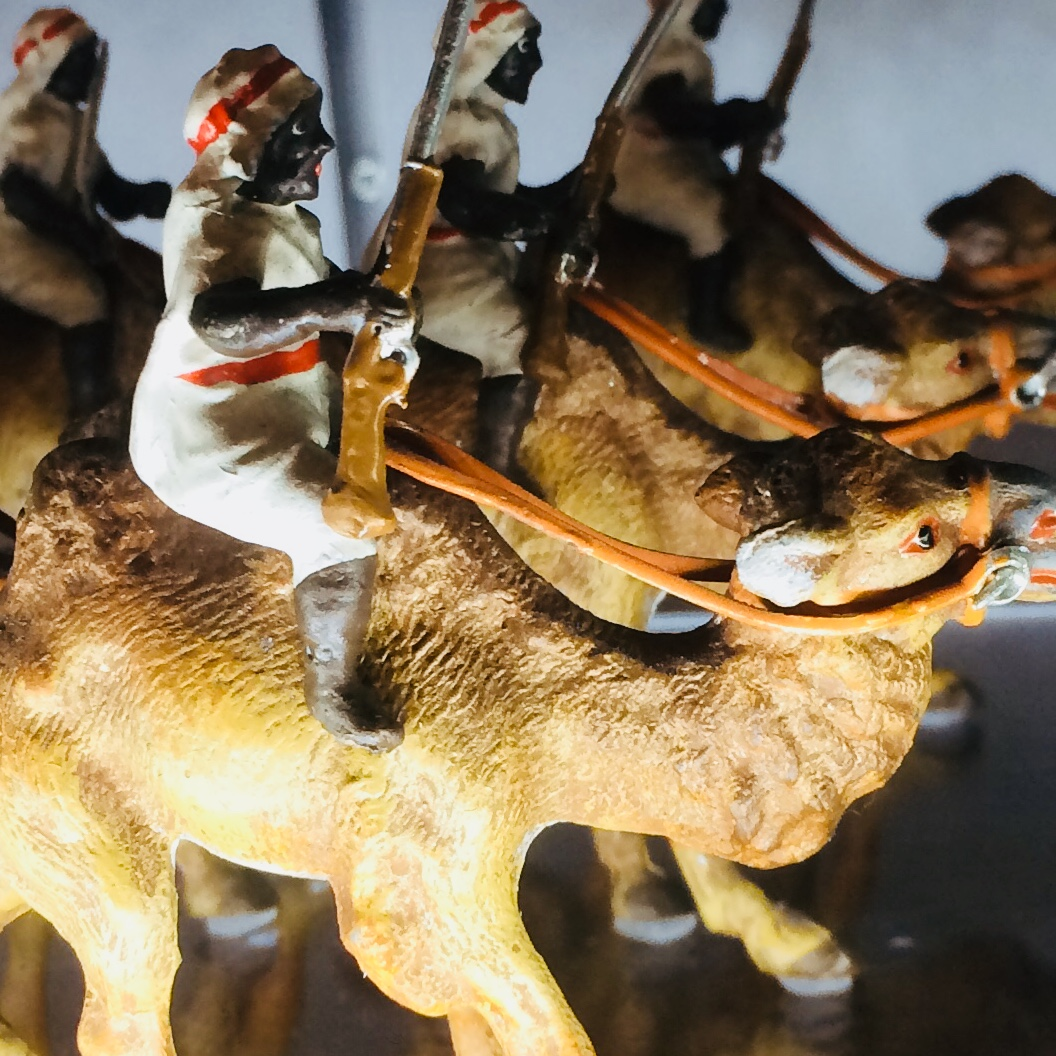
Heyde, Germany, Arab Camel Corps

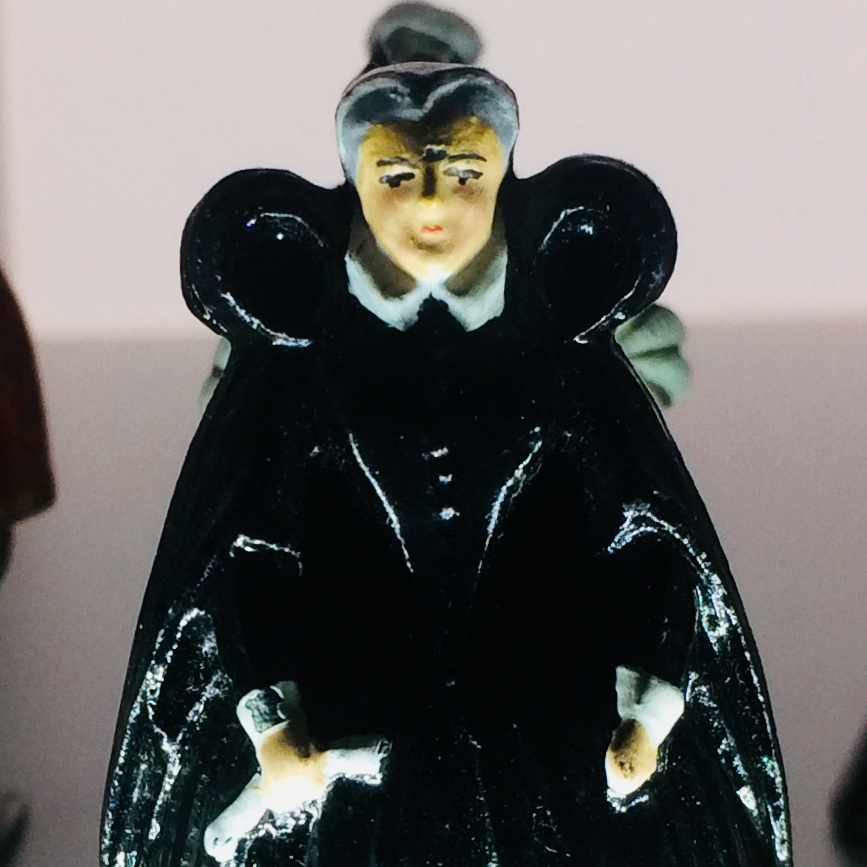
Vertunni, France, Catherine de' Medici, 20th c.

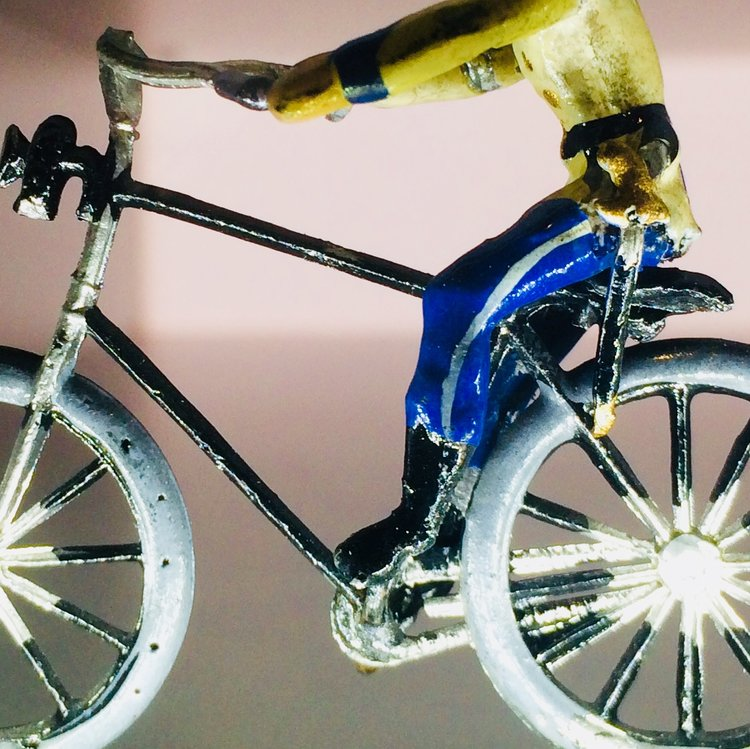
Heyde, Germany, Military Bicycle Troops

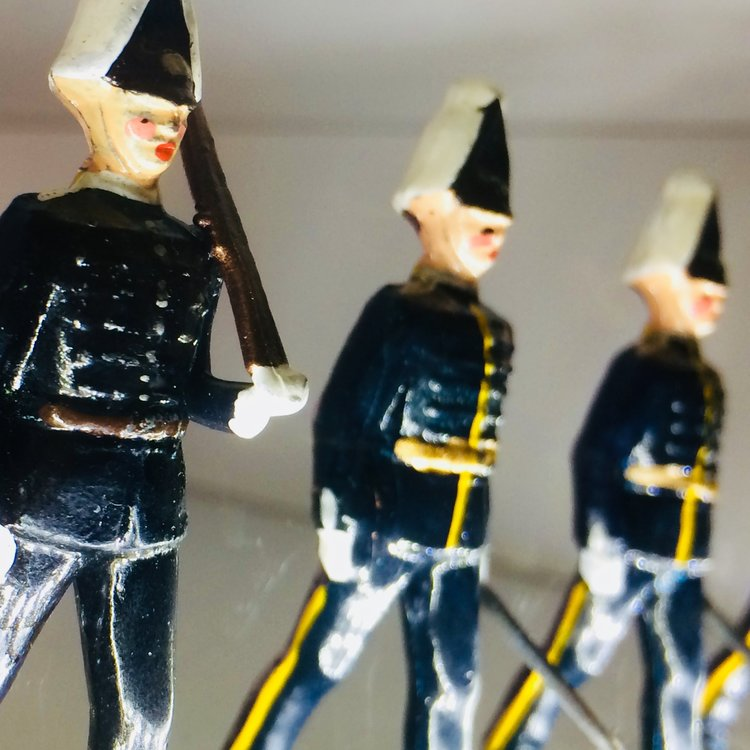
W. Britain, United Kingdom, Svea Lifeguards

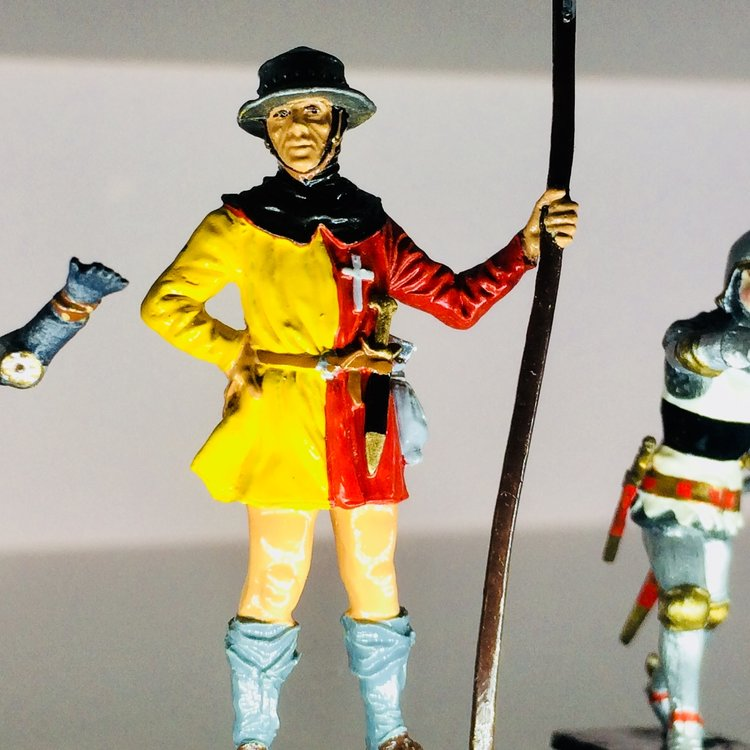
Courtenay, United Kingdom, Medieval Glaiveman

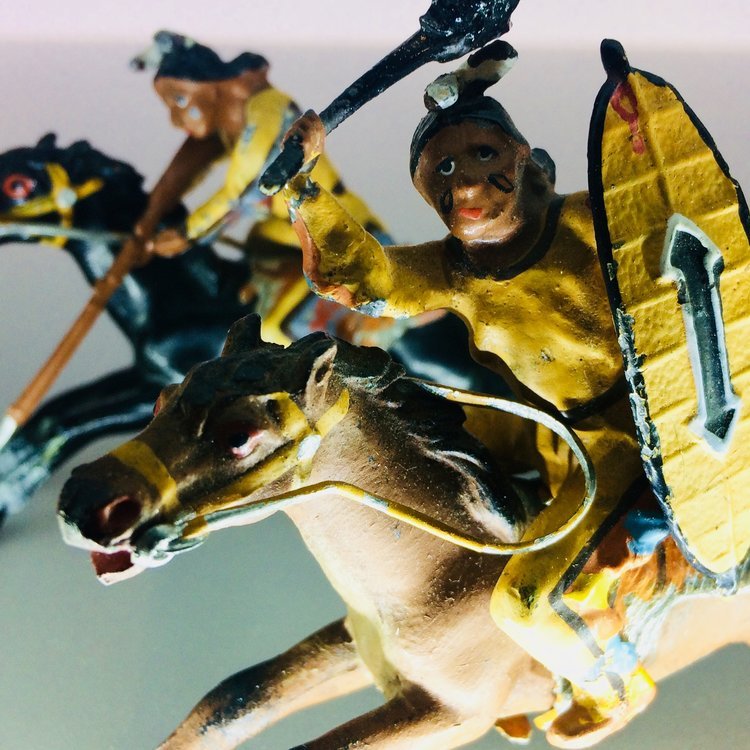
Heyde, Germany, American Indians

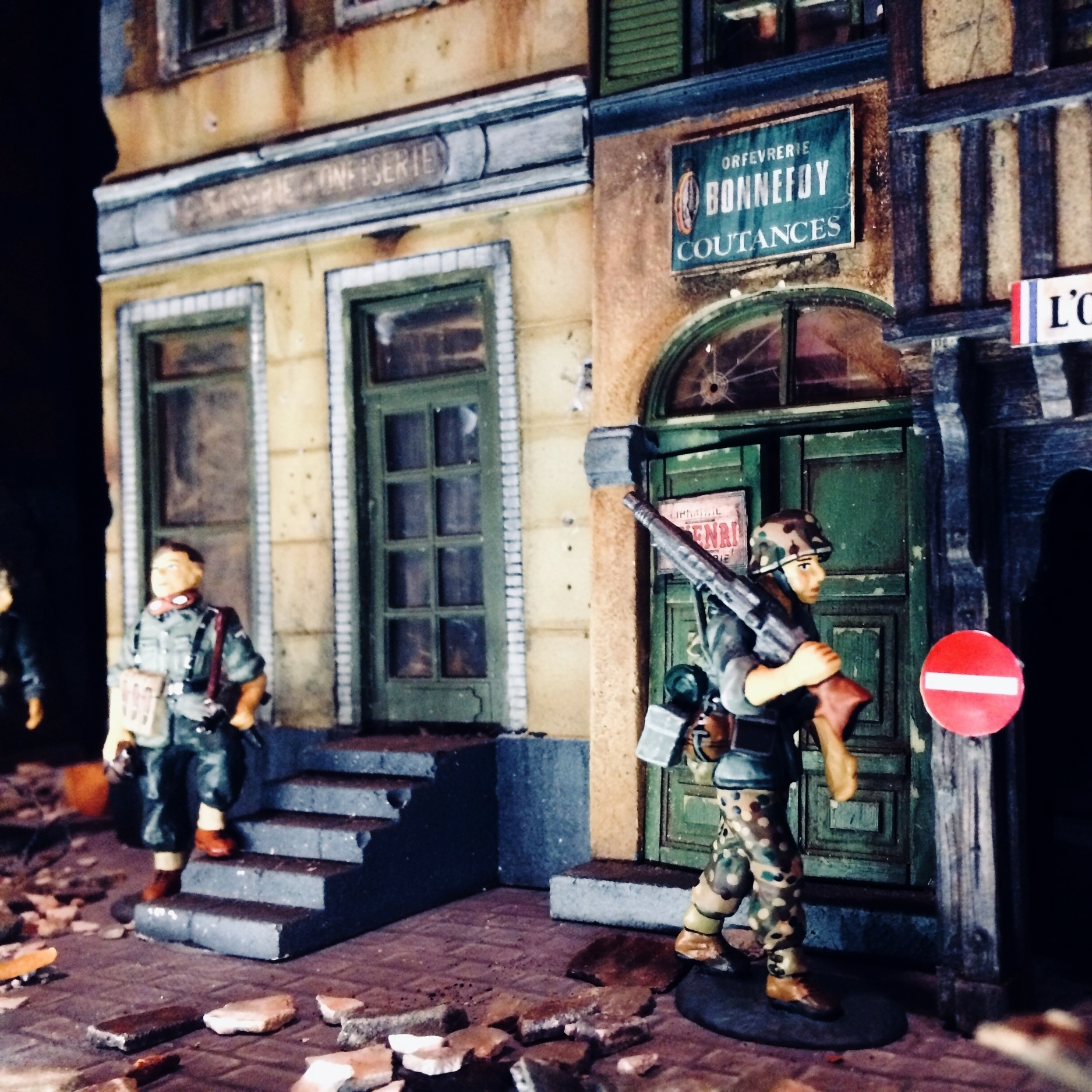
King & Country, Hong Kong, 20th & 21st c.

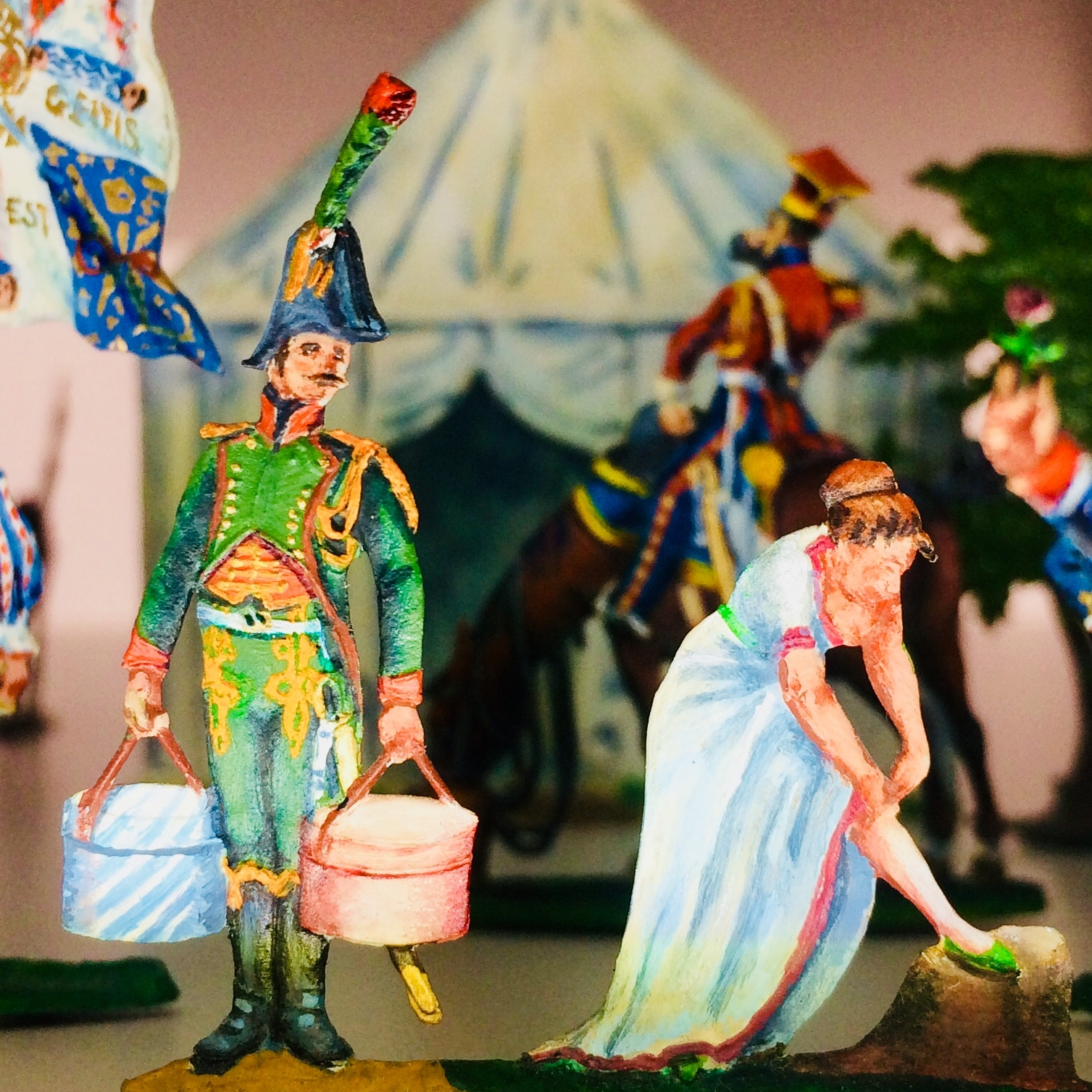
Heinrichsen, Germany, Napoleonic War Flats

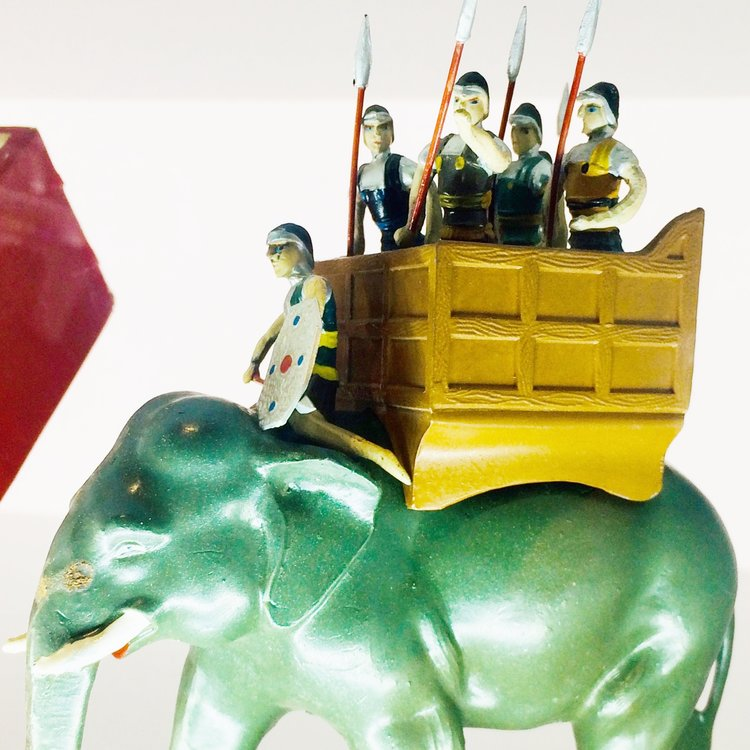
Minikin, Japan, Hannibal War Elephant, 1950

== See also ==
- List of attractions and events in the Louisville metropolitan area
- List of museums in the Louisville metropolitan area
- List of museums in Kentucky
