= Dahin Sheli School =

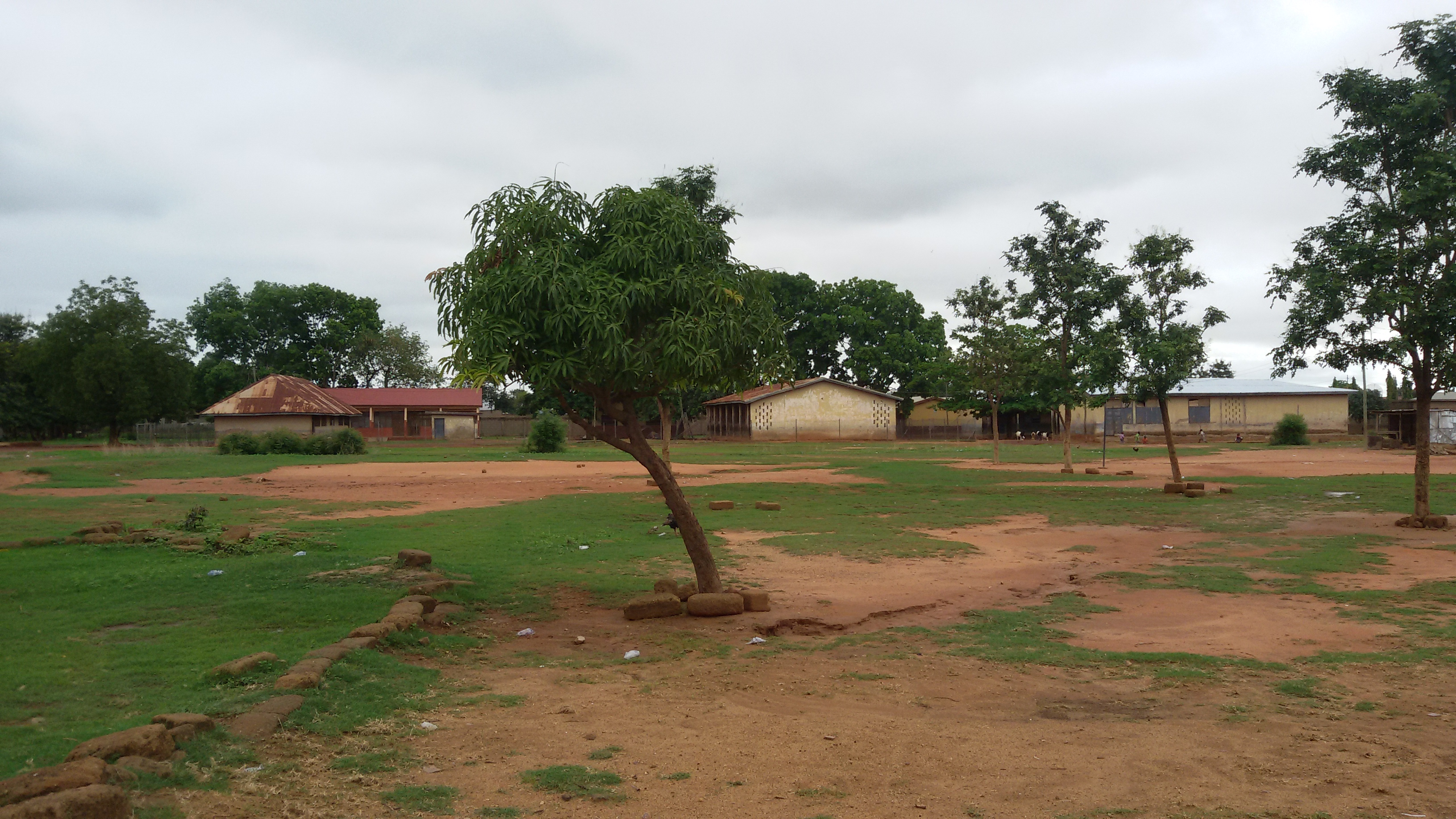

Location
- Norrip Village; Northern Region; Jisonaayili, Tamale, P O Box TL1054; Ghana

Information
- Established: 1990
- Sister school: Kentucky Country Day School
- Headmistress: Beatrice Iddi
- Average class size: 30
- Language: English

Dahin Sheli is a mixed public junior high school located in Norrip village along the Tamale-Bolgatanga Road in the Tamale metropolis of the Northern region of Ghana. It was established in 1990, to educate the children of workers of the Northern Region Rural Integrated Project (NORRIP) until the year 2000, when it was absorbed by the government as a public school for children from all walks of life.
