= Francisca de Lebrija =

Francisca de Lebrija was a 16th-century lecturer at the University of Alcalá de Henares in Spain.

De Lebrija lived in a time when it was rare for women to teach and lecture in a university. Spain was one of the few places where women did so, in part due to Queen Isabella, herself a notably educated woman, who encouraged “the love of study by personal example.” In addition, women like de Lebrija were often able to succeed because their fathers were already in that field and able to help open doors.

De Lebrija was born to scholar Antonio de Nebrija and Doña Isabel Montesinos de Solis. She was able to successfully lecture in rhetoric to such an extent that it was said to have been done to applause. In addition to this, some sources point to her having assisted her father with his research and writings however, none of her personal work has survived.

== See also ==
- Beatriz Galindo
- Isabella Losa
- Luisa de Medrano
- Juliana Morell
