= Puellae doctae =

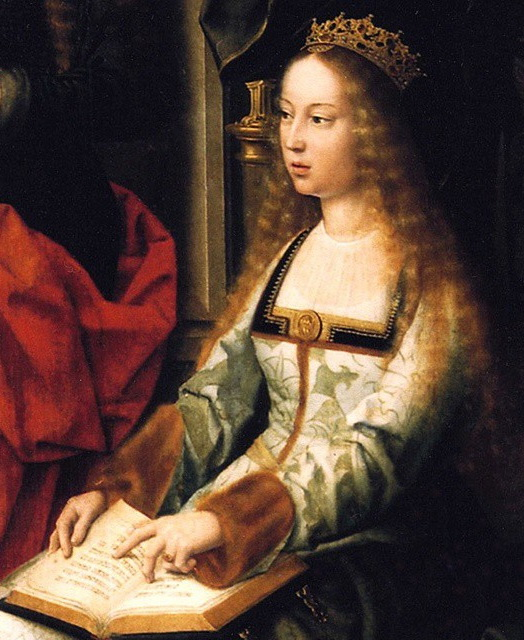
Isabel l of Castille depicted in Virgen de la mosca, province of Zamora.

Puellae doctae (Latin for "educated young women") is an idiom from the Renaissance referring to a series of elite women, educated in arts, literature and sciences, who formed part of the European courts of the 15th and 16th centuries, connecting with the Renaissance humanism and the Spanish Golden Age. The concept is especially associated to the reign of Isabella the Catholic and its ramifications in the kingdoms of Castile, Aragon and the neighboring Portugal, as well as the successive reign of Charles I of Spain and V of the Holy Roman Empire.

== History ==
Renaissance humanism, which brought a new ideal of a lay woman of culture, caused interest for letters to spread quickly to female education. High class women, generally daughters and relatives to aristocrats, intellectuals, doctors and lawmen, became able to receive deep humanist educations through private tutors and libraries. The invention of the printing press in Europe also caused reading and writing to spread among women of other social classes. This phenomenon covered Italy, France and England, but was especially fruitful in the kingdom of Castile.

=== Circle of Isabella the Catholic ===
Isabella's interest for the arts and letters drove her to learn Latin as soon as she could, and to call to her court many representatives of Spanish and Italian humanism, like Antonio de Nebrija, Alfonso de Palencia, Juan Luis Vives, Lucius Marinaeus Siculus and Peter Martyr d'Anghiera. Under those teachers, and encouraged by the queen herself, a circle of women consecrated to the study of classical cultures and languages was born in the Castilian court. This expanded to the Valentian court by the influence of Viceroy Enrique de Aragón y Pimentel and the Queen Joanna of Naples.

The queen, who had among her inspirations the philosopher and poet Christine de Pizan, "provided with preceptors and teachers all who lived in her palace, be it handmaidens or pageboys, so all of them could become learned" (proveyó de preceptores y maestros a todos los de su palacio, así doncellas como pajes, porque todos aprendiesen), as described by Marinaeo Siculo. This included Beatriz Galindo, known as La Latina due to her mastery of Latin; Beatriz de Bobadilla, her handmaiden and councilor of State, and her own daughters Isabella, Joanna, Maria and Catherine. Religious writers like Teresa de Cartagena and St. Beatrice of Silva were also called, as were lay writers like Isabel de Villena and Florencia Pinar. Some of them, such as Luisa de Medrano and Juana Contreras, came to the extent of presenting conferences in the University of Salamanca, originating the popular belief, although false, that Medrano became a college teacher.

=== Under Charles I ===
After Isabella's death, and with Charles I now sitting in the throne of Spain, his grand-niece Maria became infanta of Portugal. Maria, who sought the companionship of the Castilian humanists Luisa and Ángela Sigea de Velasco, turned her palace into "a true university of women illustrious in all genres of sciences and arts" (una verdadera universidad de mujeres ilustres en todo género de ciencias y artes), among them names like Joana Vaz, Paula Vicente, Leonor de Noronha and Públia Hortênsia de Castro. Portuguese chronicler João de Barros also wrote about other intellectual women outside the royal circle, like Izabel de Castro Andrade, about whom little has survived.

The Valentian court was presided by Germana de Foix, once the queen of Ferdinand the Catholic after Isabella's death, who after Ferdinand's own death was installed as Vicereine of Valencia by the emperor. Germana and her successive husbands, especially Ferdinand of Aragon, Duke of Calabria, gave the court a festive flavour on account of their French and Italian upbringings respectively, but also cultivated arts and sciences, with female exponents like Ana Cervatón and Mencía de Mendoza. Other Iberian women of lesser status but similar prestige were the Castilian Juana de Vergara, sister to humanist Juan de Vergara, and the unrelated Isabel de Vergara, who translated the works of Erasmus, as well as Catalina de Paz, the Catalonian Juliana Morell and the Valentian Tecla de Borja.

== Bibliography ==
- Alvar Ezquerra, Alfredo (2005) «Modelos educativos de Isabel la Católica», en La reina Isabel y las reinas de España, Realidad, modelos e imagen historiográfica, Actas de la VIII Reunión Científica de la Fundación española de Historia Moderna, Madrid, Volume I. pp. 123– 136.
- Borreguero Beltrán, Cristina. Puellae Doctae en las cortes peninsulares. 2011, Dossiers Feministes
- Segura Graíño, Cristina (1994). "Las sabias mujeres en la Corte de Isabel la Católica". Las sabias mujeres: educación, saber y autoría siglos III-XVII [IV jornadas de historia medieval de la Asociación cultural Al-Mudayna] (in Spanish). Asociación cultural Al-Mudayna. pp. 175–187. ISBN 978-84-87090-13-4.
- Prado Herrera, María Luz de, «De las “sabias” de la Edad Moderna a las pioneras universitarias: el difícil acceso de las mujeres al conocimiento», TRAMA: Los trabajos de las mujeres en la Andalucía Moderna, nº. 1, 2022.
- Zavala, Iris M; Carrión, María Mercedes. Breve historia feminista de la literatura española (en lengua castellana). 4: La literatura escrita por mujer: Desde la Edad Media hasta el siglo XVIII, 1997, Anthropos
