= Marcela Lagarde =

Mexican academic, author, researcher, anthropologist, feminist activist and politician

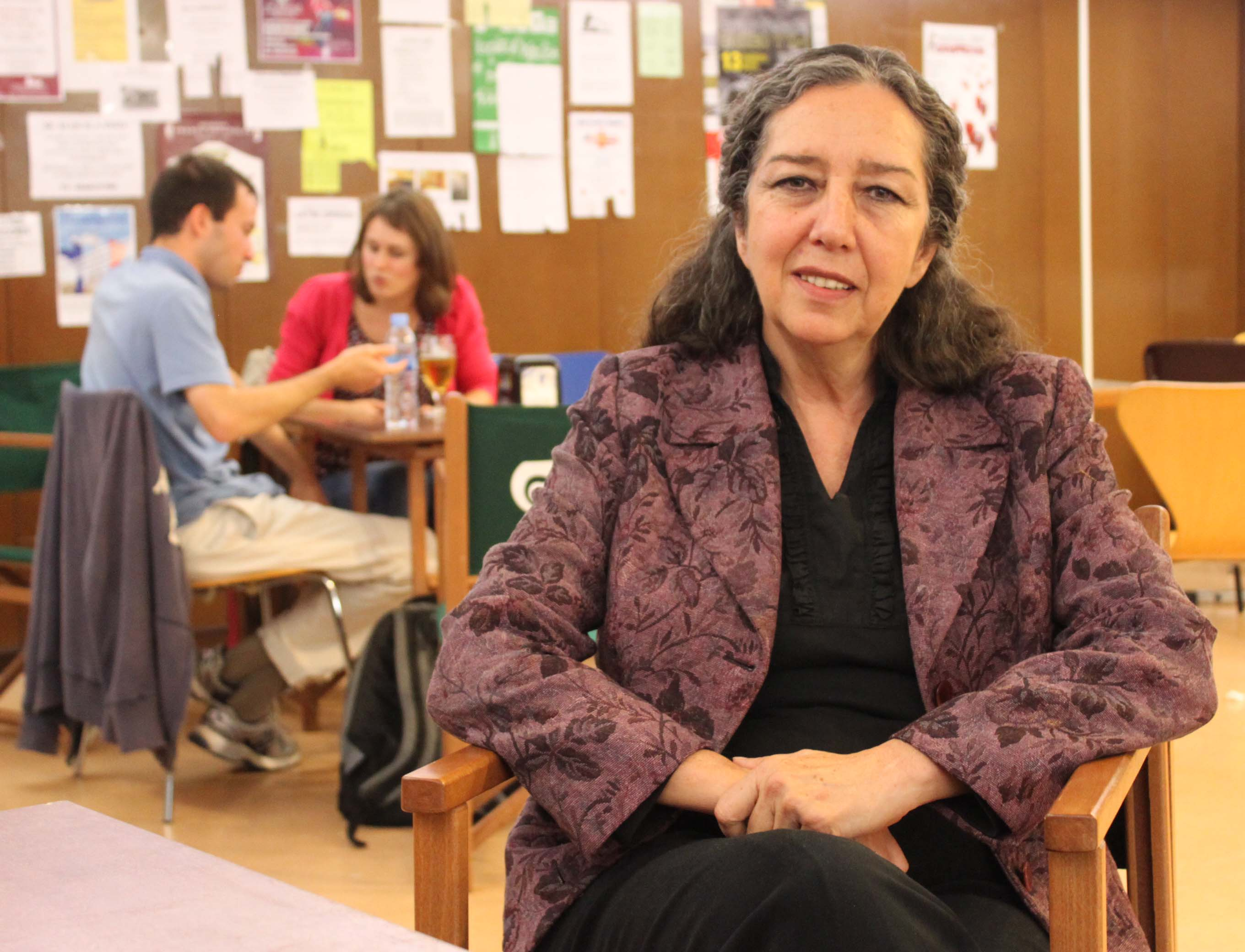
- Born: 30 December 1948 (age 77); Mexico City, Mexico
- Occupations: Academic, researcher, anthropologist and politician
- Political party: PRD

María Marcela Lagarde y de los Ríos (born 30 December 1948) is a Mexican academic, author, researcher, anthropologist, feminist activist and politician affiliated with the Party of the Democratic Revolution. From 2003-2006 she served as Deputy of the LIX Legislature of the Mexican Congress as a plurinominal representative.

== Biography ==
María Marcela Lagarde was born in 1948 in Mexico City. She earned an undergraduate degree in ethnology and both a Master's and PhD in Anthropology. During her university studies, she participated in the student uprisings known as Mexico 68. She has been a professor of feminist studies at Universidad Nacional Autónoma de México (National Autonomous University of Mexico) since 1975.

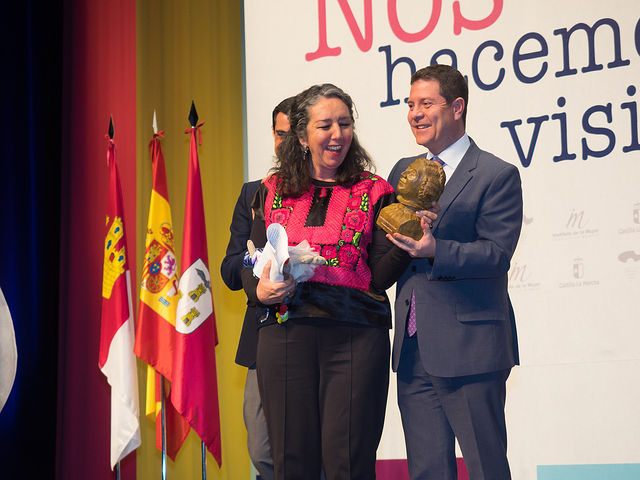
Marcela Lagarde receives the II "Luisa de Medrano" award, 8 March 2017, at the Teatro Circo in Albacete.

On March 8, 2017, the regional government of Castilla–La Mancha presented the II ‘Luisa de Medrano’ Prize to Marcela Lagarde at the Teatro Circo in Albacete, honoring her international advocacy for women's freedom and equality during the institutional ceremony.

She supported leftist politics first as a member of the Mexican Communist Party (PCM), then the Unified Socialist Party of Mexico (PSUM) and Mexican Socialist Party (PMS), before joining the Party of the Democratic Revolution (PRD) and being elected to serve in the House of Deputies in 2003. She served as a plurinominal representative until 2006.

She is the president of Red de Investigadoras por la Vida y la Libertad de las Mujeres (Network of Researchers for the Life and Freedom of Women) and coordinator of Cassandra Workshops for feminist anthropological studies.

== Feminicide ==
Lagarde is credited with being the first person to introduce the concept of "femicide" to Latin American audiences. Originally coined in the United States, Diana Russell had defined the term in a 1992 book entitled "Femicide: The Politics of Woman Killing". However, the academic concept, did not take root until Lagarde used it to describe the systemic killings of women throughout Latin America and Mexico. In epidemic proportions, women were killed in numbers far exceeding what was to be expected by drug violence or internal conflict. In Lagarde's concept, feminicide refers to the abduction, death and/or disappearance of women and girls which is allowed by the state, or happens with impunity. In Lagarde's redefinition of the term, the state is complicit because most of the perpetrators have neither been caught nor prosecuted by authorities.

In 2003, the LIX Mexican Chamber of Deputies established a Special Commission on Feminicide. Lagarde served as the president of the commission directing the research on violence against women in Mexico. After three years of work, in 2006, the commission issued 14 volumes of their research to the legislature, which adopted the term accepting that it points to the State's responsibility. In 2009 the Inter-American Court of Human Rights issued a verdict against Mexico condemning the failure to protect hundreds of women in Ciudad Juarez, who were killed. The Court recognized that the homicides were gender-based even though the term femicide was not used, establishing a precedent.

== Romantic love ==
In many of her texts, Marcela Lagarde says that today women are acting like medieval creatures longing for a romantic love impossible to be found and with no critical reflection on their self-respect. This undermines and weakens them, as nobody with these feelings can develop their own potential. Lagarde describes the myth of romantic love as women's captivity and that the fusion of the socially assigned roles of mothers and wives are guaranteeing women to be the eternal caretakers.

She states that prohibiting women self-love and imposing on them to be social beings in service of loving and caring for others has been the biggest perversion of the patriarchal culture. Lagarde places the crucial question of how women can love someone else if they don't love themselves. Therefore, it is crucial that women define their subjectivity, individuality and personal expression as women not "inhabited" or "colonized" by others (men). When women monopolize their love onto the other, then the other becomes more important than they selves and inhabit their bodies and with this their subjectivity. Women stop being true women and live for the other. Giving up yourself and being the emotional slave of the other is an expectation that than goes both ways, it is lived as the self-fulfillment of the woman and at the same time expected from everybody else.

== Partial works ==
- (1990) Los cautiverios de las mujeres: madresposas, monjas, putas, presas y locas
- (1996) Género y feminismo : desarrollo humano y democracia
- (1998) Claves feministas para el poderío y la autonomía de las mujeres
- (1999) Una mirada feminista en el umbral del milenio
- (2000) Claves feministas para liderazgos entrañables
- (2001) Claves feministas para la autoestima de las mujeres
- (2001) Claves feministas para la negociación en el amor
- (2005) Para mis socias de la vida: claves feministas para el poderío y la autonomía de las mujeres, los lid
- (2008) Amor y sexualidad, una mirada feminista
