= Francisco Ramírez de Madrid =

Francisco Ramírez de Madrid (died 1501) was a Spanish artillery officer, counselor of the Catholic Monarchs and Secretary of King Ferdinand II of Aragon.

== Biography ==
Francisco Ramírez de Madrid was the son of Juan Ramírez de Oreña and Catalina de Ramírez de Cobreces, both from San Vicente de la Barquera in Cantabria, who had settled in Madrid. He obtained a position as a clerk in the court of Henry IV of Castile in Segovia, and then became mayor of Toledo. The Catholic Monarchs confirmed him in this position.

Ramírez de Madrid was appointed Captain General of Artillery in the Zamora campaign, and was rewarded by the Crown many times for his successful campaigns. He played a key role in the campaign of Málaga, using the explosion of a mine to capture a critical tower in the defenses of Málaga. Ferdinand appointed him royal secretary and knighted him. He was awarded the estate of Bornos in Cadiz and various properties in Granada.

After the conquest of Granada, he returned to Madrid, where he accumulated many properties. All the land between the Paseo del Prado and Paseo de las Delicias, and the two banks of the stream of Atocha were his. His second wife, whom he married in December 1491, was Beatriz Galindo the writer, humanist and preceptor of Queen Isabella I of Castile. They had two children, Fernán and Nuflo. He lived in what is now the Palacio de Viana in Madrid. He died in 1501 while combating a Mudéjar insurrection in the Sierra of Ronda.
