= Beatriz Galindo =

Spanish educator (1465–1535)

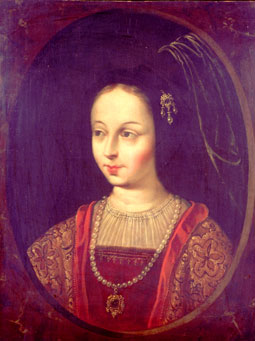
- Born: c. 1465; Salamanca, Crown of Castile
- Died: 23 November 1535 (aged 69–70); Madrid, Crown of Castile
- Occupations: Writer, teacher of Latin and grammar for Isabella I of Castile
- Spouse: Francisco Ramírez de Madrid (m. 1491; died 1501)
- Children: 2
- Father: Juan López of Gricio

Beatriz Galindo, sometimes spelled Beatrix and also known as La Latina (c. 1465 – 23 November 1535), was a Spanish Latinist and educator. She was a writer, humanist and a teacher of Queen Isabella of Castile and her children. She was one of the most educated women of her time. There is uncertainty about her date of birth; some authors believe it was 1464 or 1465. The La Latina neighborhood in Madrid is named after her.

== Life ==
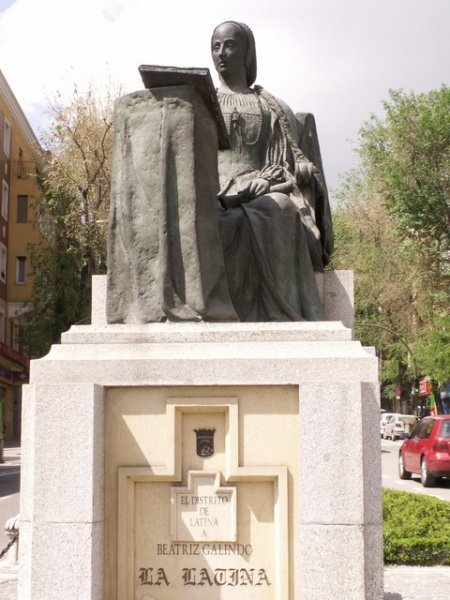
Statue to Beatriz Galindo in Madrid

Beatriz Galindo was born in Salamanca, into a family of Zamoran origin in the lower nobility of hidalgos; they had been wealthy but by the time of her birth were almost destitute.

Her family chose her among her sisters to become a nun, since she was fond of reading, and they allowed her to receive more education in grammar at one of the dependent institutions of the University of Salamanca to help her career before taking her vows, but her great skill in Latin set her on an academic career before she was twelve years old. It is likely that she was at one time a student of the great Spanish scholar Antonio de Nebrija.

She was nicknamed La Latina for her skill in Latin, and was appointed tutor to the children of Queen Isabella of Castile. She was tutor to five queens altogether: Isabella herself, her daughters Isabella and Maria (both queens of Portugal), Catherine of Aragon, the future wife of Henry VIII of England, and Joanna of Castile, the future wife of Philip of Habsburg and later known as Juana the Mad.

She wrote in Latin, producing poetry and a commentary on Aristotle.

In December 1491 she married royal adviser Francisco Ramirez de Madrid. They had two children.

She was one of the first women to be active in public life during the renaissance. It is reported that she dressed in the habit of a nun or abbess. She founded the Hospital of the Holy Cross (Santa Cruz de Madrid) in 1506 in Madrid, which still exists. She died in Madrid, aged about 70.

== Legacy ==
The neighbourhood in Madrid where she once lived is known today as La Latina from her nickname. There are statues of her in Salamanca and Madrid. There is a Beatriz Galindo Secondary School in Madrid. In Salamanca there is an early education and primary school that also takes her name.

The novel Falling Pomegranate Seeds: The Duty of Daughters by Wendy J. Dunn is inspired by her story.

== See also ==
- Francisca de Lebrija
- Isabella Losa
- Luisa de Medrano
- Juliana Morell
