= Atienza =

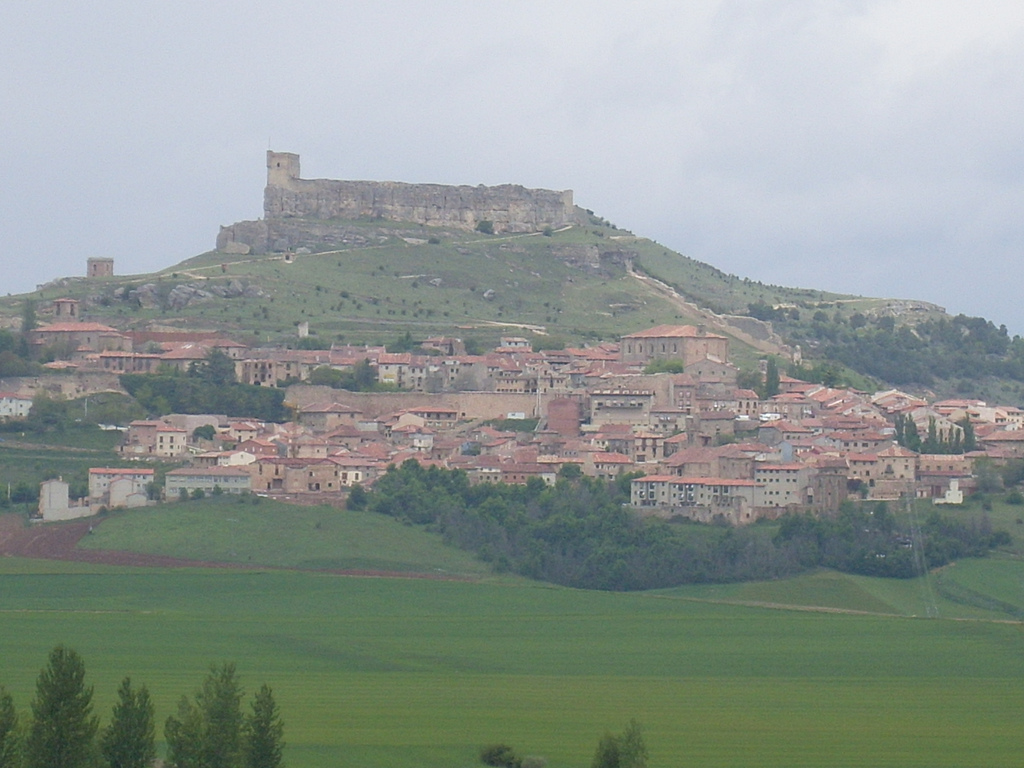

- Coat of arms

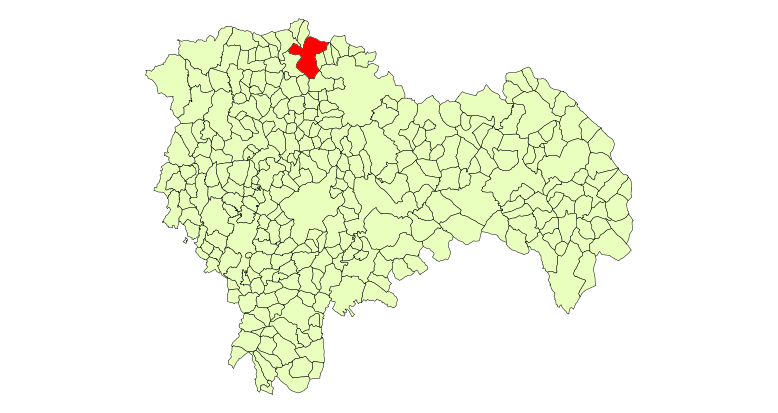
- Location in Guadalajara Province

- Location within Province of Guadalajara Location within Castilla-La Mancha Location within Spain
- Coordinates: 41°11′54″N 2°51′55″W
- Country: Spain
- Province: Guadalajara
- Municipality: Atienza

Area
  - Total: 104 km^{2} (40 sq mi)
- Elevation: 1,169 m (3,835 ft)

Population (2025-01-01)
  - Total: 406
  - Density: 3.90/km^{2} (10.1/sq mi)
- Time zone: UTC+1 (CET)
  - Summer (DST): UTC+2 (CEST)

Atienza (Spanish pronunciation: [aˈtjen.θa]) is a municipality located in the province of Guadalajara, Spain. According to the 2023 census (INE), the municipality had a population of 434 inhabitants.

The Castle of Atienza is situated here.

There were ancient Celtiberian settlements in the Cerro del Padrastro.

== Geology ==
Atienza, as well as the area surrounding it, is located in the transition zone between the Sistema Ibérico and the Sistema Central.

== Gallery ==
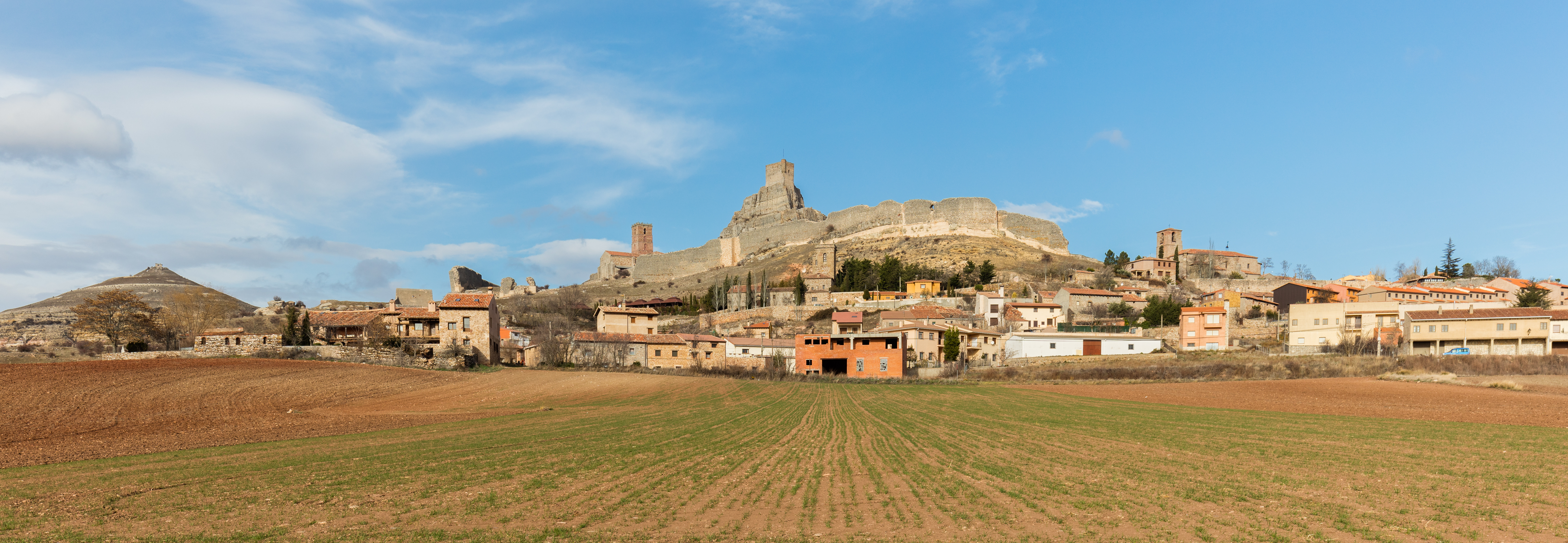
View of Atienza

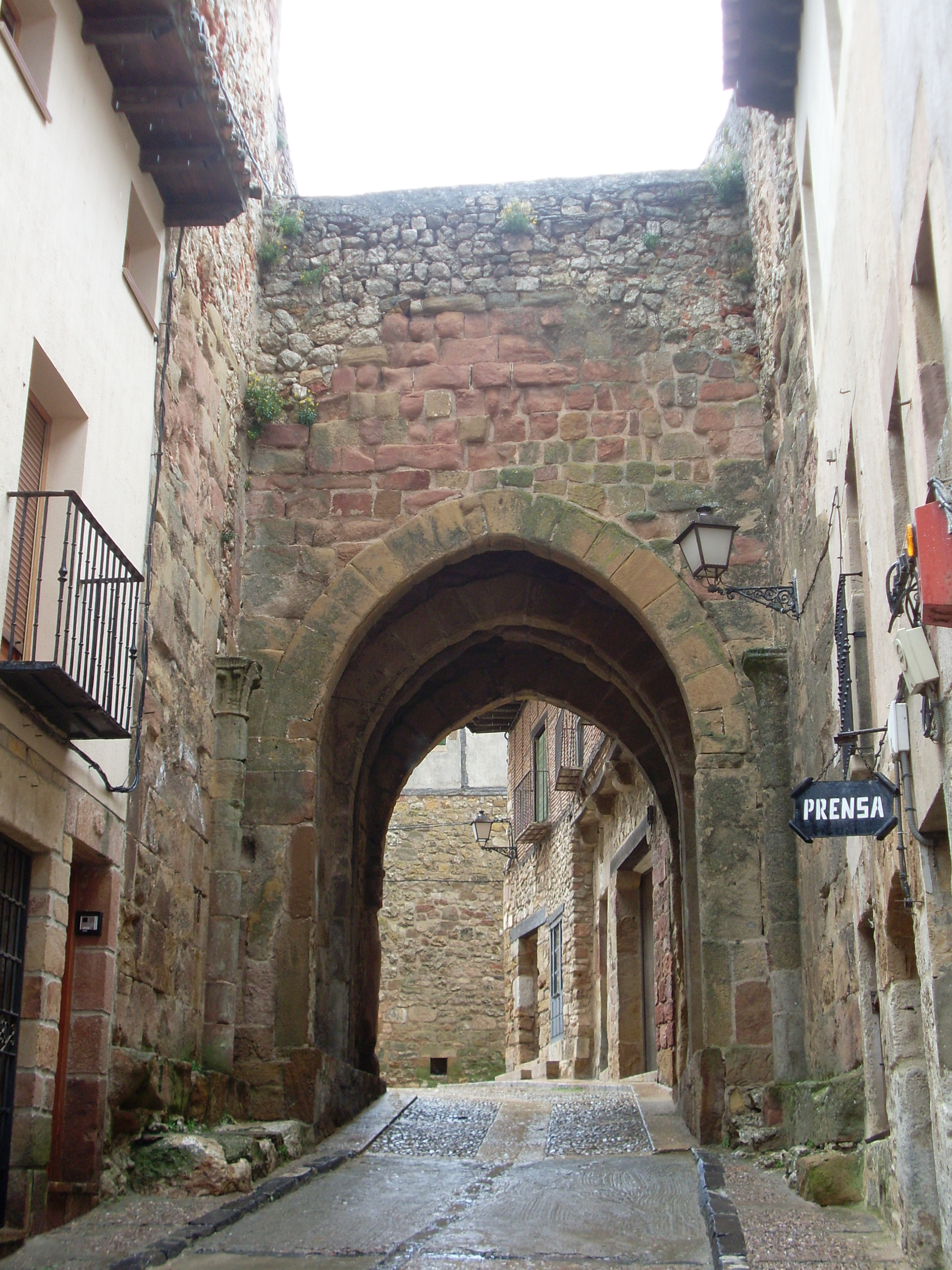
A gate of the medieval Atienza's City Walls

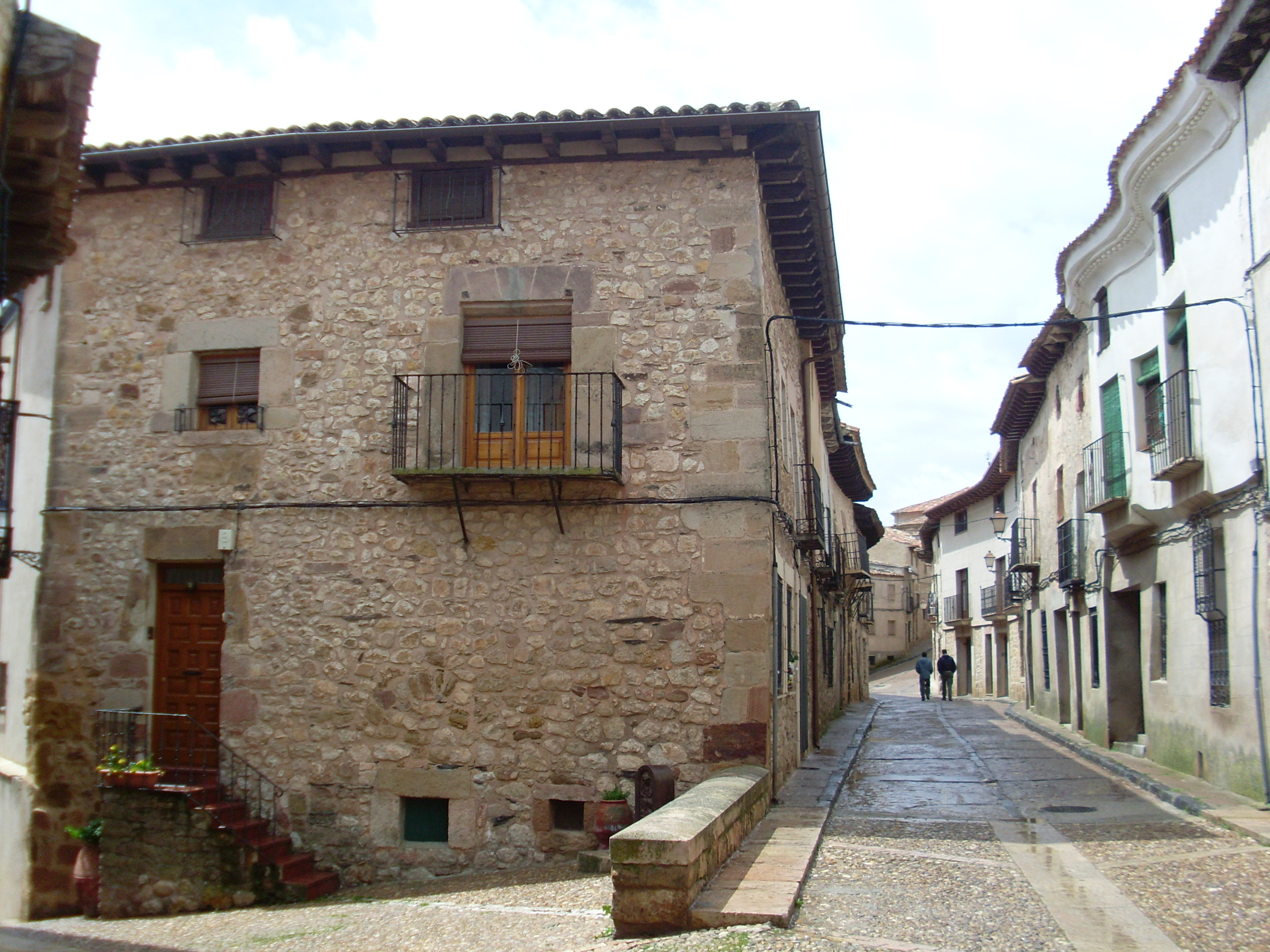
A street of Atienza

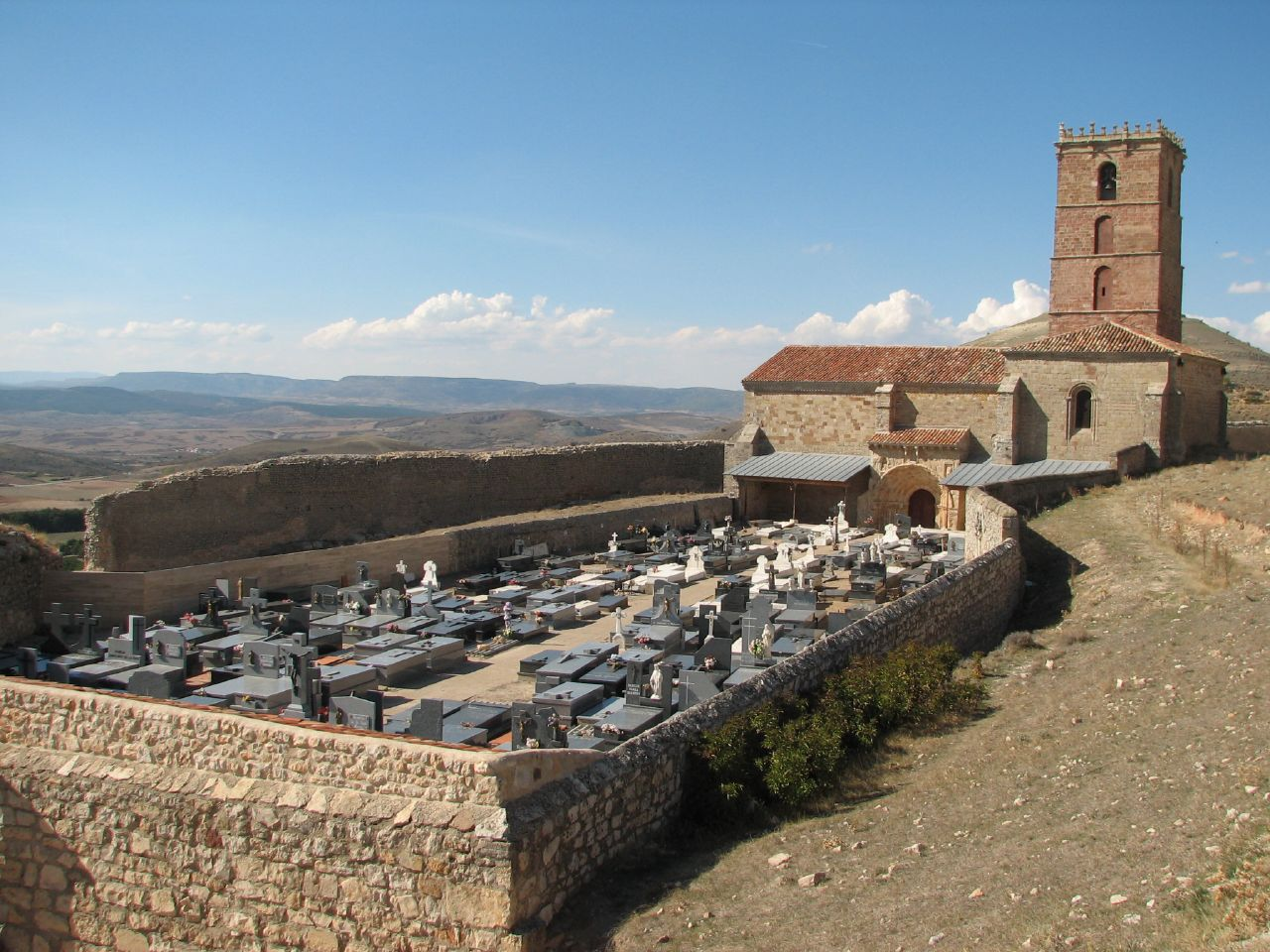
Cemetery and Romanesque Church of Santa María del Rey

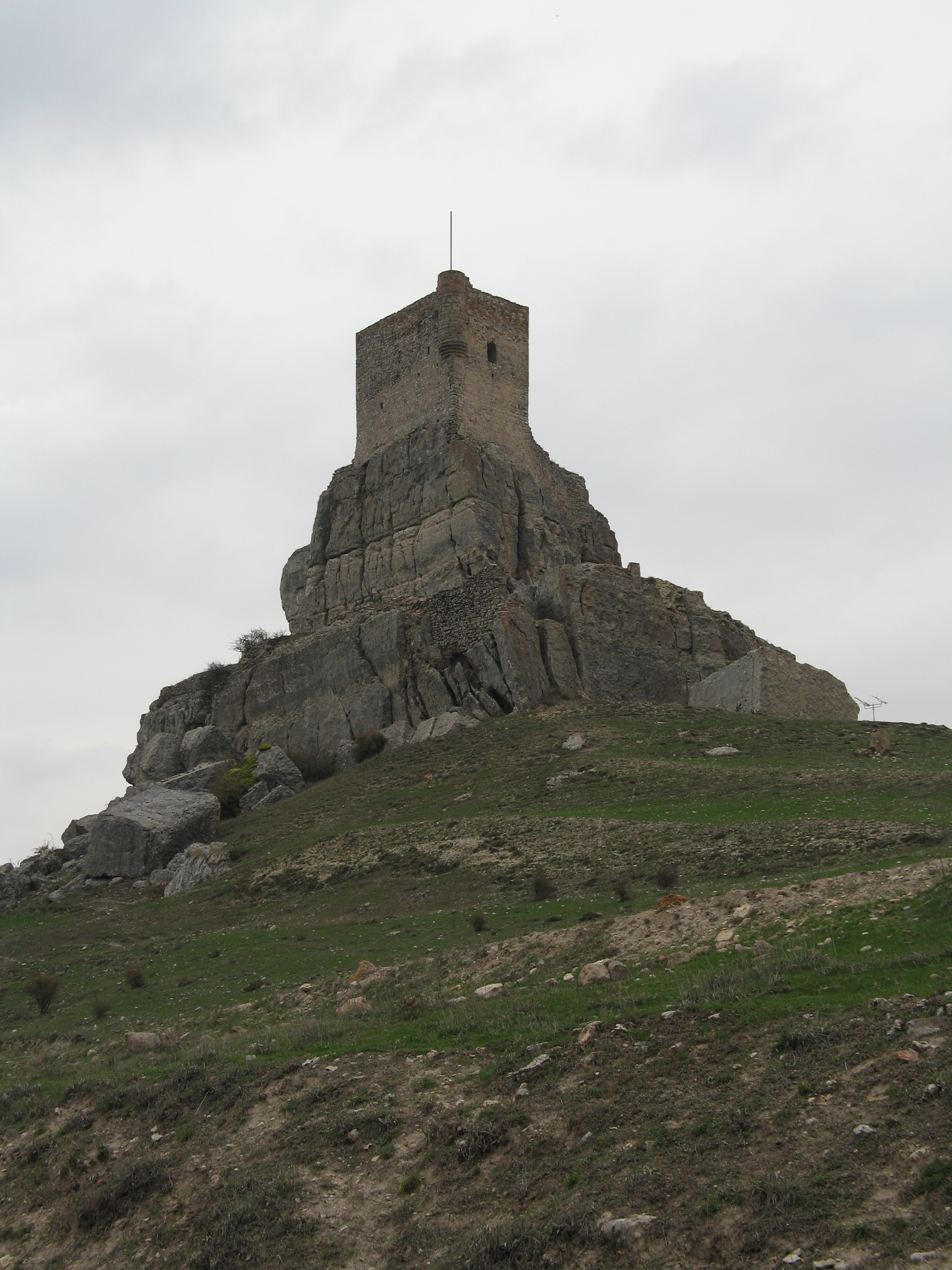
Castle of Atienza

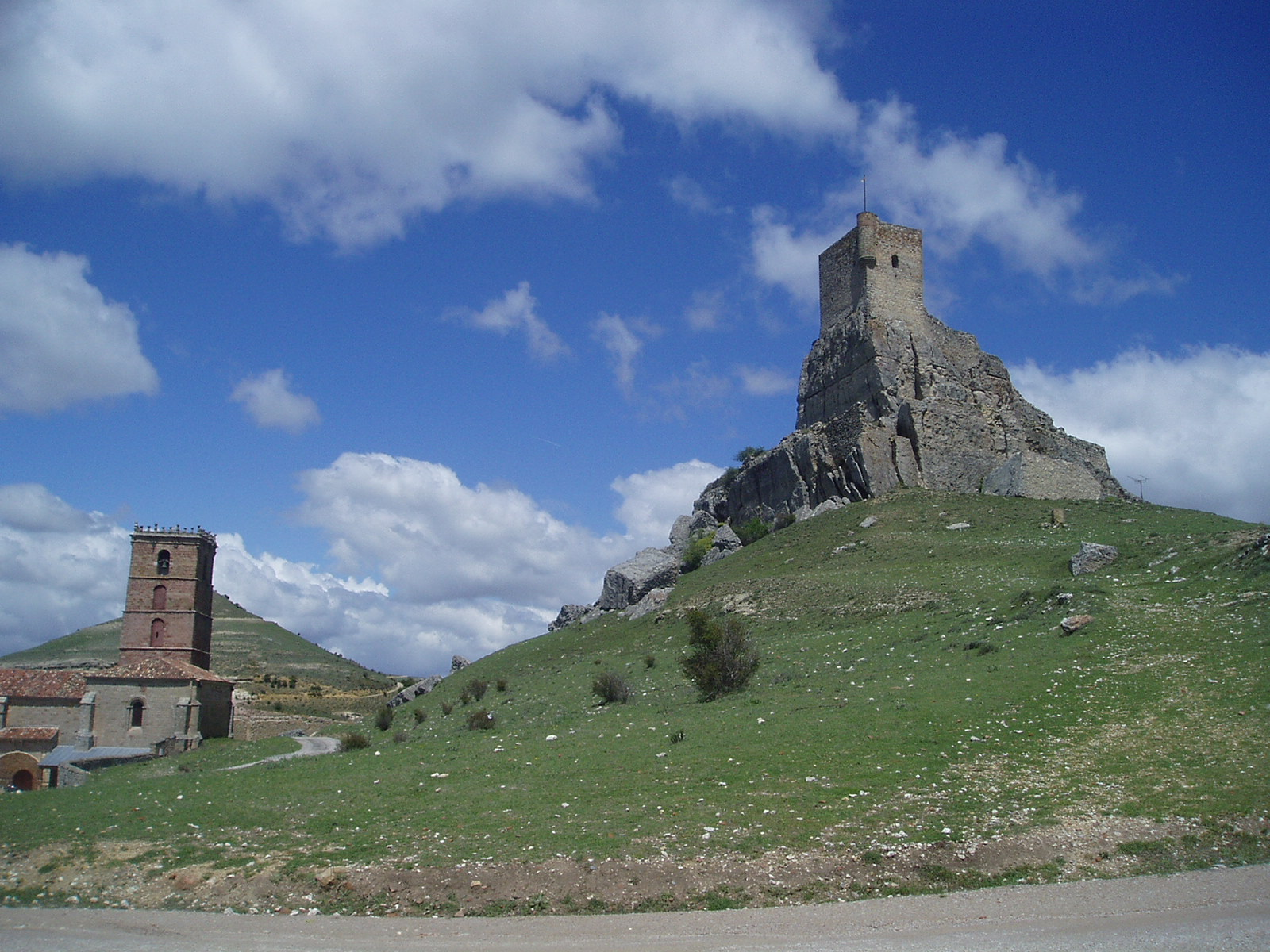
Castle of Atienza and Santa María del Rey church

== Notable people ==
- Juan Bravo was born in Atienza.
- Luisa de Medrano was born in Atienza. (August 9, 1484).
- Garcí Bravo de Medrano, perpetual alcaide of Atienza castle.
- Bonifacio Escudero, worked as a doctor, has a street to his name.
