= Castle of Atienza =

- Castillo de Atienza (Spanish)
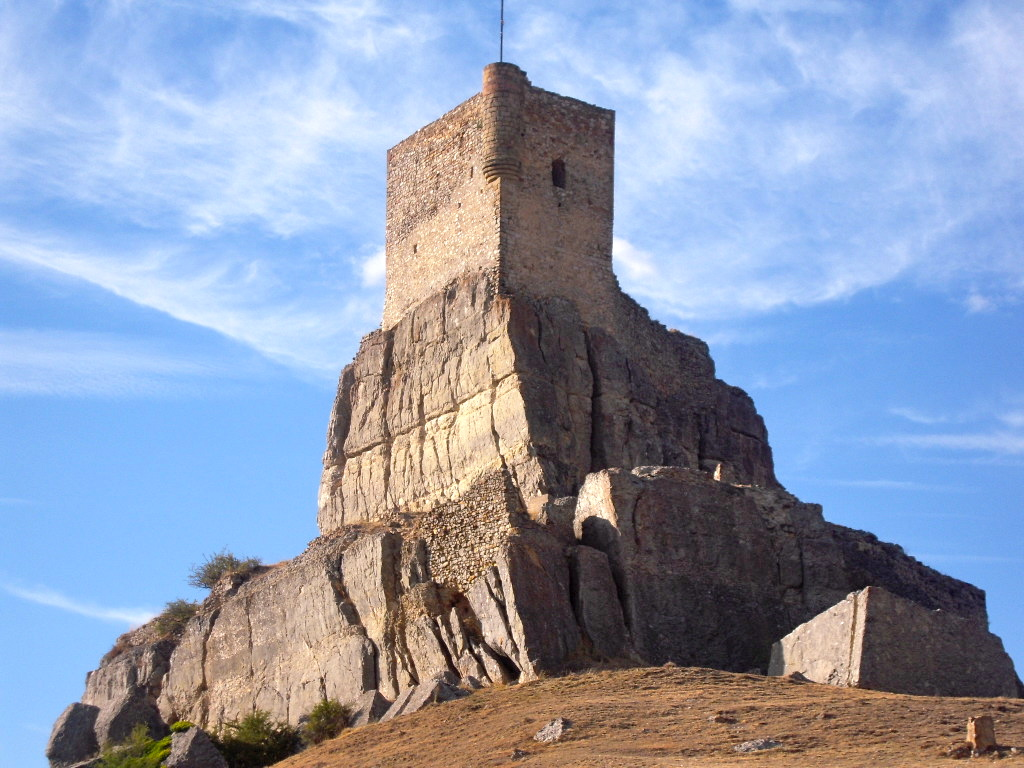

- Location within Spain
- 41.200556°N 2.872725°W
- Location: Atienza, Spain

Spanish Cultural Heritage
- Official name: Castillo de Atienza
- Type: Non-movable
- Criteria: Monument
- Designated: 1931
- Reference no.: RI-51-0000609

The Castle of Atienza (Spanish: Castillo de Atienza) is a castle located in Atienza, Spain. It was declared Bien de Interés Cultural in 1931. Standing high on a rock, it can be seen from miles around. The castle frequently changed hands between the Muslims (Arabs or Moors) and the European Christians until it was finally taken by Alfonso VI in 1085.

== History ==
The castle is located on the site of earlier Roman and Visigoth fortifications. The Moors first took the castle until it surrendered briefly to Alfonso III of Asturias from 870 to 874 before it was retaken. In 967, it came under the control of Al-Hakam II before being taken once again by the Christians under García Fernández of Castile until the arrival of Almanzor at the end of the 10th century. In the 11th century, it became an important component of the Muslim defences along the River Duero. After being taken by the Christian troops of Alfonso VI in 1085, it was enlarged on several occasions, maintaining its importance.

Under John II, the Navarre troops occupied the castle with 250 horsemen, 500 foot soldiers and artillery. In 1487, Garcí Bravo de Medrano became the perpetual alcaide of the castle. After the castle had lost its strategic importance it became a prison. It was sacked by the French during the War of Independence.

== Description ==
Today the castle consists of a tower and an inner enclosure 130 m by 30 m. The arched entrance is flanked by two square towers. There are two covered cisterns in the enclosure. There is a fireplace on the upper floor of the main tower. Originally the castle had four storeys as well as tunnels which connected it with churches in the town. It was protected by two walls, one connecting the main tower to the entrance, the other protecting the rock itself.
