= Juliana Morell =

Spanish nun and intellectual child prodigy (1594–1653)

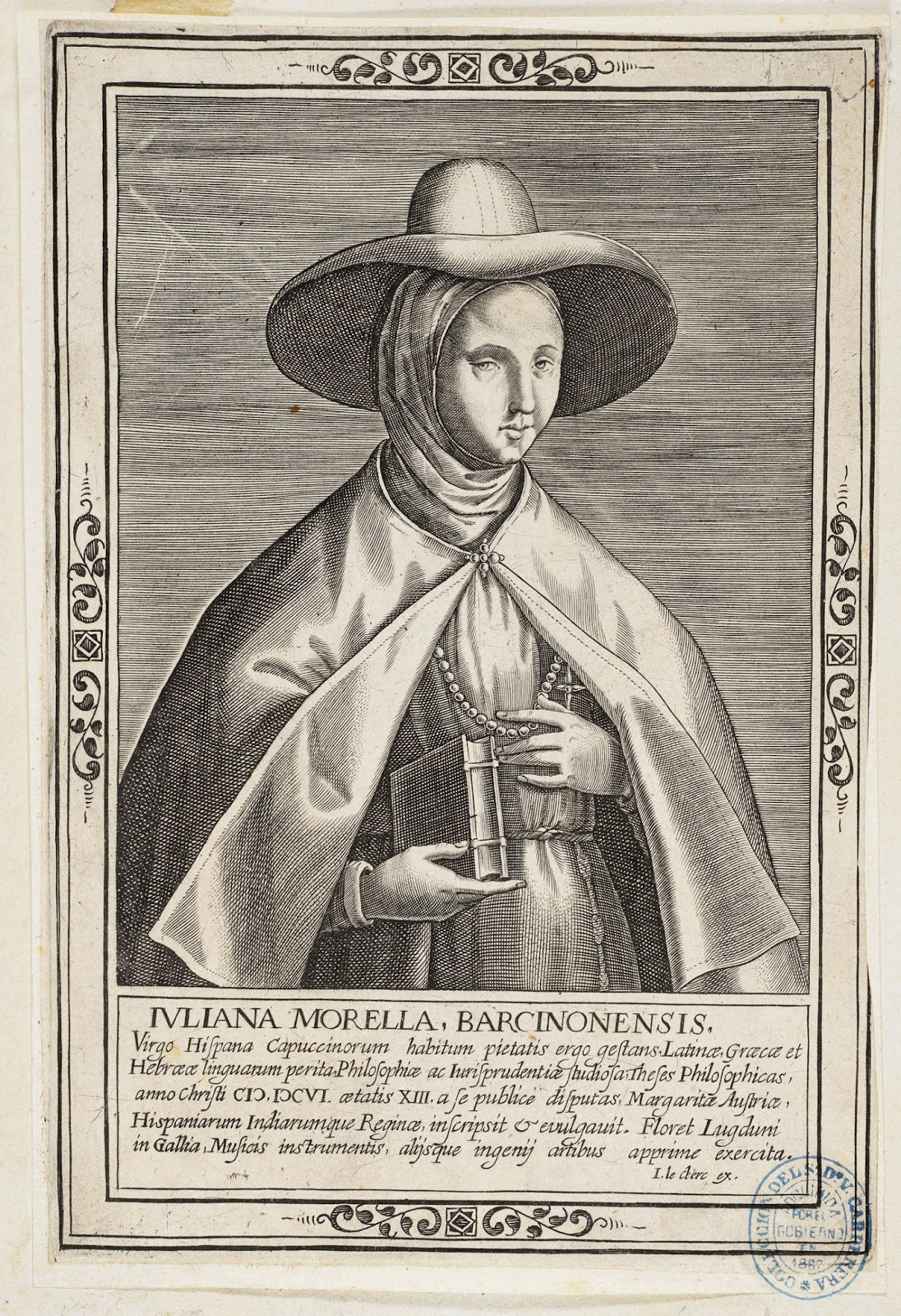
Juliana Morell

Juliana Morell (16 February 1594 – 26 June 1653) was a Catalan Dominican nun and intellectual child prodigy. Some sources assert that she received a doctorate in canon law in Avignon in 1608. In 1941, Sylvanus Morley traced this to an 1859 misreading by Joaquín Roca y Cornet of 17th-century Latin documents. and cited others stating that, while her father wished for her to obtain a doctorate, she refused, regarding it as incompatible with her status as a nun.

== Biography ==
Morell was born in Barcelona to a prominent banker and his wife. She was left motherless when very young and received her first training from the Dominican nuns in Barcelona. At the age of four, she began studying Latin, Greek, and Hebrew at home under competent teachers. When she was seven years old, she wrote a letter in Latin to her father, who was away.

After being accused of taking part in a murder, Juliana's father fled to Lyon with his daughter, then eight years old. At Lyon, Juliana continued her studies, devoting nine hours daily to rhetoric, dialectics, ethics, and music. At the age of 12, she publicly defended her theses in ethics and dialectics summa cum laude. She then applied herself to physics, metaphysics and canon and civil law. Her father, who had meanwhile settled at Avignon, wanted his daughter to obtain a law doctorate. This was achieved in 1608, when she publicly maintained her law theses at the papal palace of the vice-legate before a distinguished audience, among whom was the Princesse de Condé. It is not clear what body granted her the degree.

According to some sources, Morell was the first woman to receive a university degree, but the circumstances are unclear. Juliana Morell "defended theses" in 1606 or 1607 in Lyon or maybe Avignon, although claims that she received a doctorate in canon law in 1608 have been discredited. The first woman to receive a doctorate degree in the modern era was Elena Cornaro Piscopia in 1678 at the University of Padua.

Disregarding wealth and an advantageous offer of marriage, she entered during the same year the convent of Saint Praxedes at Avignon. In 1609 she received the habit of the order, and on 20 June 1610 took the vows. On three occasions she was named prioress. For two years before her end she was in great bodily suffering and her death agony lasted five days; she died in 1653 at Avignon.

In a laudatory poem, Lope de Vega speaks of her "as the fourth of the Graces and the tenth Muse". He also says "that she was an angel who publicly taught all the sciences from the professorial chairs and in schools".

== Works ==
Morell left a number of religious writings:

- A translation of the "Vita Spiritualis" of Vincent Ferrer, with comments and notes to the various chapters (Lyons, 1617; Paris, 1619);
- Exercices spirituels sur l'éternité (1637);
- French translation of the Rule of St. Augustine with addition of various explanations and observations for the purpose of instruction (Avigon, 1680);
- History of the reform of the convent of St. Praxedes, with lives of some pious sisters, in manuscript;
- Latin and French poems, some printed and some in manuscript.

== See also ==
- Beatriz Galindo
- Francisca de Lebrija
- Isabella Losa
- Luisa de Medrano
