= Luisa de Medrano =

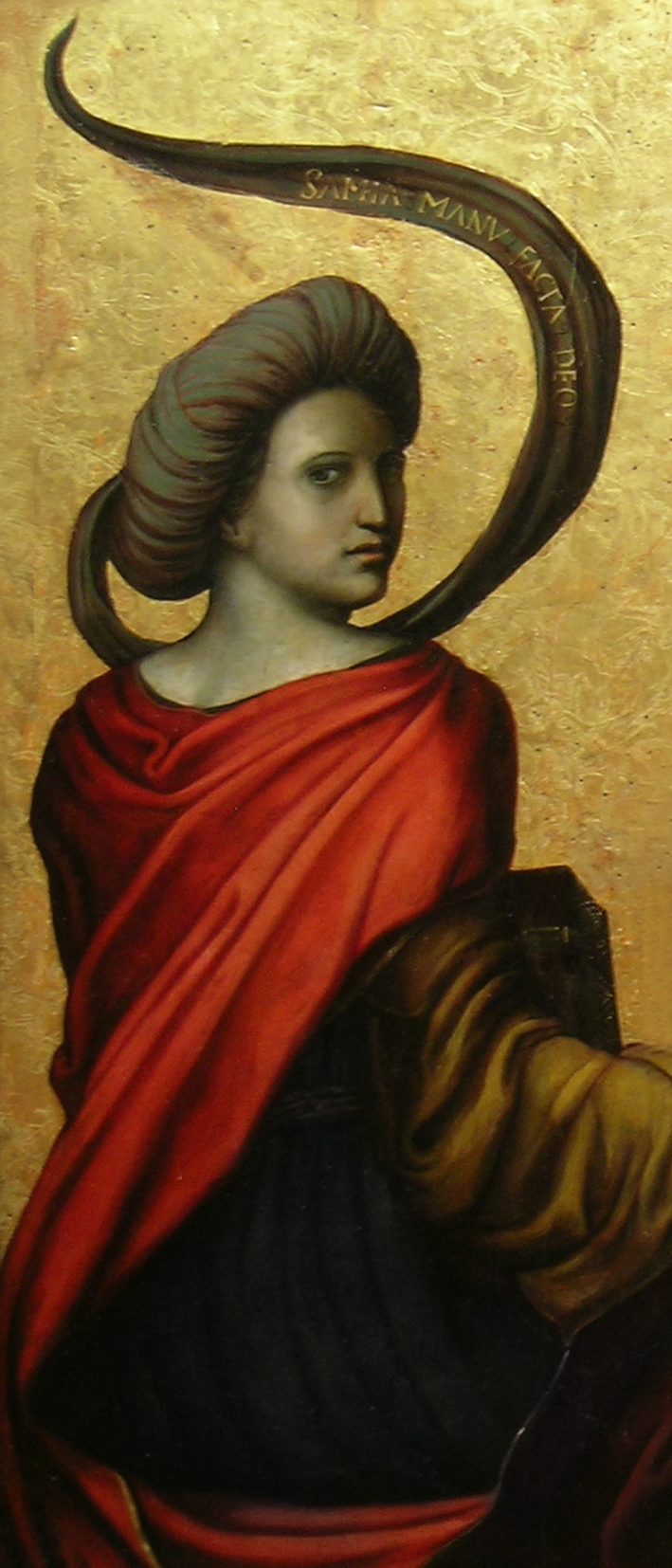

Luisa de Medrano (Atienza 9 August 1484 – 1527), was a Navarrese-Castilian scholar. She is known as the first female Professor in Spain, at the University of Salamanca. Luisa de Medrano Bravo de Lagunas Cienfuegos belonged to the group of Renaissance women who were famous for their knowledge and called by their contemporaries "puellae doctae" (learned girls).

== Life ==
Luisa de Medrano was born into the Spanish nobility, her father being ricohombre Don Diego López de Medrano from Iguzquiza Navarre and Dona Magdalena Bravo de Lagunas from Atienza in Castile. She lived in the Castle of San Gregorio, whose origin is recorded in the document drawn up in Medina del Campo and dated July 29, 1461, by which King Henry IV gave Don Diego de Medrano permission to build this fortified house.

Her intellectual abilities and solid formation enabled her to teach Latin at the University of Salamanca. Her brother Don Luis de Medrano was the Rector of Salamanca Univsersity during her time. The scholar Sículo misspelled her name, using Lucia, instead of Luisa.

She taught Latin at the University of Salamanca, and replaced Antonio de Nebrija. She wrote poems and philosophy, though her work has been lost. She benefited from living in the climate of tolerance and advancement for women that Isabella I actively cultivated in her court, and which disappeared after her death.

Under the protection of Queen Isabella I, Luisa de Medrano learned history, culture and humanist philosophy alongside children of the royal family. Her sister Catalina de Medrano was a lady of the Queen. The news about Luisa de Medrano appears throughout history over and over again copied from two main sources: a note by Pedro de Torres, a student and rector from Salamanca, and by Lucio Marineo Siculo.

Lucio Marineo Siculo left a note of Luisa in his Cosas memorables de España, both in the Latin edition and in the Castilian edition of 1530, and in a Letter addressed to Luisa herself:

"Now I finally know that nature has not denied women talent, which is proven in our time, above all, thanks to you (Luisa de Medrano), who in words and eloquence put your head above men, you, the only girl and tender young woman in Spain who attends diligently and eagerly not to wool but to books, not to the spindle but to the quill, not to the needle but to the pen. In Salamanca we met Lucía (Luisa) de Medrano, a very eloquent young woman. To whom we hear not only speaking as an orator, but also reading and declaring Latin books publicly at the University of Salamanca." 

Testimony by Pedro de Torres:

On November 16, 1508, Medrano's daughter reads in the chair of Canons.

== Legacy ==
In 1943, the Ministry of National Education granted, at the proposal of the Cloister of the National Institute of Secondary Education of Salamanca, female, that this Institute be called "Lucía de Medrano".

On October 12, 2015, the Rectorate and the University of Salamanca agreed that the Hall of Cloisters of the Higher Schools of the University be named "Lucía de Medrano" to honour the first female professor in Spain and Europe.

In 2015, the Castilla-La Mancha Community Board created the Castilla-La Mancha International Award for Gender Equality "Luisa de Medrano,” which has been awarded annually since 2016 by the Castilla-La Woman Institute in La Mancha with the aim of distinguishing those people, groups, entities or institutions that have stood out or stand out in the defense of equality between women and men.

On August 9, 2022 Google celebrated Luisa's 538th birthday.

== See also ==
- Beatriz Galindo
- Francisca de Lebrija
- Isabella Losa
- Juliana Morell
