= Isabella I of Castile =

Queen of Castile and León from 1474 to 1504

Isabella I
- Catholic Queen of the Spains (Note: In the papal bull Si convenit of 1496, Ferdinand II and Isabella I were named "King and Queen Catholics of the Spains (Rey y Reina Católicos de las Españas)".); Servant of God
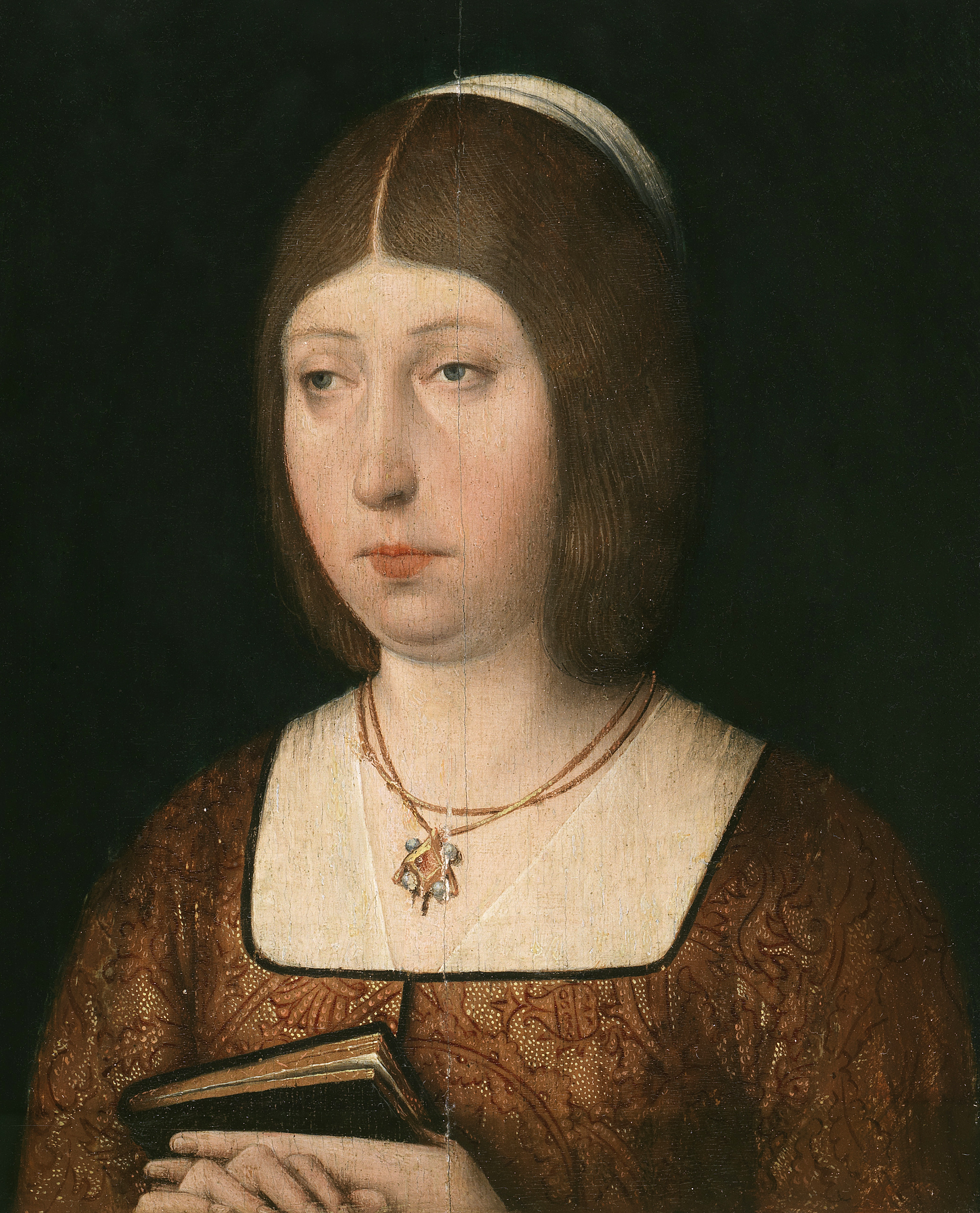
- Anonymous portrait of Isabella I, c. 1490

Queen of Castile and León
- Reign: 11 December 1474 – 26 November 1504
- Coronation: 13 December 1474
- Predecessor: Henry IV
- Successor: Joanna I
- Co-monarch: Ferdinand V (from 1475)

Queen consort of Aragon
- Tenure: 20 January 1479 – 26 November 1504
- Born: 22 April 1451; Madrigal de las Altas Torres, Ávila, Crown of Castile
- Died: 26 November 1504 (aged 53); Medina del Campo, Valladolid, Crown of Castile
- Burial: Royal Chapel of Granada, Andalusia, Spain
- Spouse: Ferdinand II of Aragon (m. 1469)
- Issue more...: Isabella, Queen of Portugal; John, Prince of Asturias; Joanna, Queen of Castile and Aragon; Maria, Queen of Portugal; Catherine, Queen of England
- House: Trastámara
- Father: John II of Castile
- Mother: Isabella of Portugal
- Religion: Roman Catholicism

Isabella I (Note: Spanish: Isabel I) (22 April 1451 – 26 November 1504), also known as Isabella the Catholic, (Note: Spanish: Isabel la Católica) was Queen of Castile and León from 1474 until her death in 1504. She was also Queen of Aragon from 1479 until her death as the wife of King Ferdinand II. Reigning together over a dynastically unified Spain, Isabella and Ferdinand are known as the Catholic Monarchs. Her reign marked the end of the Reconquista and also the start of the Spanish Empire, allowing Spain to become a major force in European politics.

Isabella's marriage to Ferdinand of Aragon in 1469 created the basis of the de facto unification of Spain. With Ferdinand's help, she won the War of the Castilian Succession, securing her position as Queen of Castile. Isabella reorganized the governmental system, brought the crime rate down, and unburdened the kingdom of the debt which her half-brother King Henry IV had left behind. Her reforms and those she made with her husband had an influence that extended well beyond the borders of their united kingdoms.

Isabella and Ferdinand are known for being the first monarchs to be referred to as the queen and king of Spain, respectively. Their actions included completion of the Reconquista, the Alhambra Decree which ordered the mass expulsion of Jews from Spain, initiating the Spanish Inquisition, financing Christopher Columbus's 1492 voyage to the New World, and establishing the Spanish Empire, making Spain a major power in Europe and the world and ultimately ushering in the Spanish Golden Age.

Together with her husband, Isabella was granted the title of "Catholic Monarch" by Pope Alexander VI, a Spaniard. Her beatification process was opened in 1958, and in 1974 she was granted the title of Servant of God.

== Life ==
=== Early years ===
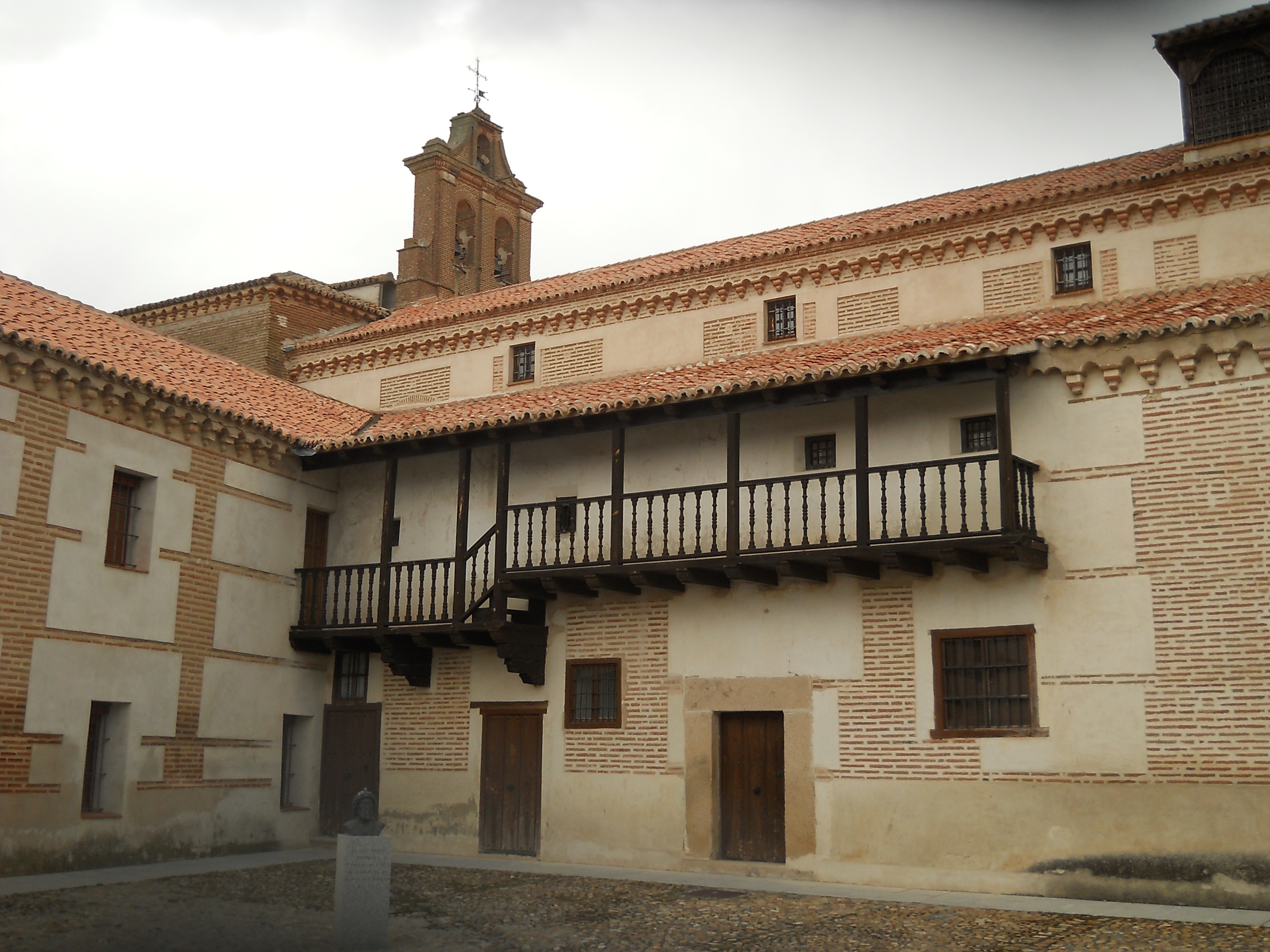
Birthplace of Isabella the Catholic, located in the town of Madrigal de las Altas Torres

Isabella was born in Madrigal de las Altas Torres to King John II of Castile and his second wife, Isabella of Portugal, on 22 April 1451 (Maundy Thursday). At the time of Isabella's birth, she was second in line to the throne after her older half-brother Henry. Henry was 26 at that time and married, but childless. Isabella's younger brother Alfonso was born two years later on 17 November 1453, demoting her position to third in line. When her father died in 1454, her half-brother ascended to the throne as King Henry IV. Isabella and her brother Alfonso were left in King Henry's care. Isabella, Alfonso, and their mother then moved to Arévalo...

This is the letter that King John II sent to the city of Segovia to announce the birth:

I let you know that by the grace of Our Lord, this past Thursday, Queen Doña Isabel, my very dear and beloved wife, gave birth to a princess. I share this news so that you may give many thanks to God.

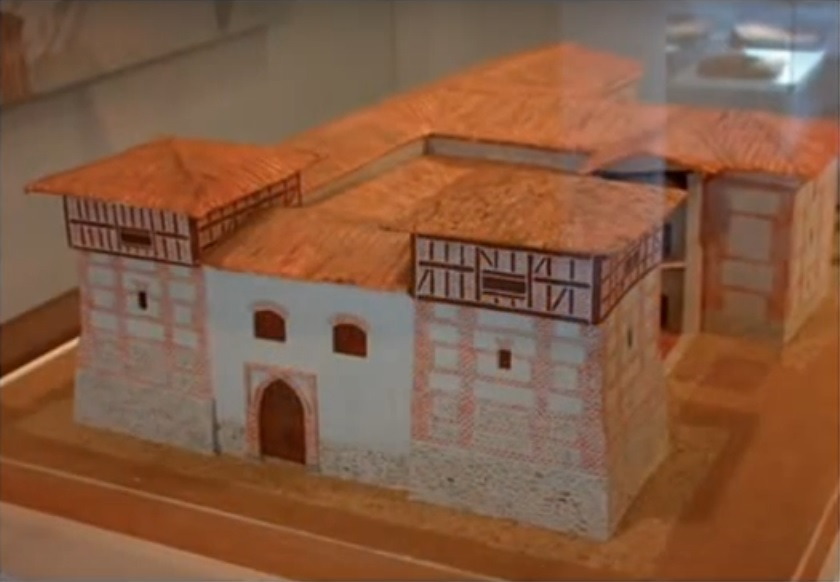
Isabel's residence in her early years, with her mother and brother

These were times of turmoil for Isabella. The living conditions at the castle in Arévalo were poor, and they suffered from a shortage of money. Although her father arranged in his will for his children to be financially well taken care of, Henry did not comply with their father's wishes, either from a desire to keep his half-siblings restricted or from ineptitude. Even though her living conditions were difficult, Isabella was instructed in lessons of practical piety and in a deep reverence for religion under the supervision of her mother.

When the king's wife, Joan of Portugal, was about to give birth to their daughter Joanna, Isabella and Alfonso were summoned to court in Segovia to come under the direct supervision of the king and to finish their education. Alfonso was placed in the care of a tutor while Isabella became part of the queen's household.

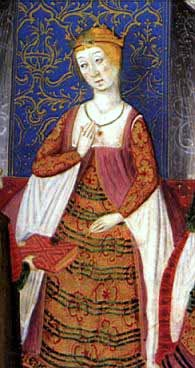
Isabella in the Rimado de la Conquista de Granada, from 1482, by Pedro Marcuello

Some of Isabella's living conditions improved in Segovia. She always had food and clothing and lived in a castle that was adorned with gold and silver. Isabella's basic education consisted of archery, arithmetic, baking, chess, cooking, court etiquette, dancing, drawing, equestrian skills, falconry, French, good manners, grammar, history, hunting, Italian, music, the needle arts of embroidery, needlepoint, sewing, spinning, and weaving, painting, philosophy, Portuguese, rhetoric, reading, spelling, writing, and singing, as well as religious instruction. She and her ladies-in-waiting entertained themselves with art, embroidery, and music. She lived a relaxed lifestyle, but she rarely left Segovia since King Henry forbade this. Her half-brother was keeping her from the political turmoil going on in the kingdom, though Isabella had full knowledge of what was going on and of her role in the feuds.

In 1464, Henry awarded Beltrán de la Cueva, a royal favorite, mastership of the Order of Santiago, angering a faction of the Castilian nobility headed by Juan Pacheco, Alfonso Carrillo de Acuña, and Pedro Girón. (Note: Pacheco later reconciled with Henry IV and supported Joanna's cause.) Desiring to depose Henry and establish Infante Alfonso on the throne, Pacheco and his followers circulated rumors that Infanta Joanna was actually the child of Beltrán de la Cueva and demanded that Alfonso be named the King's heir. (Note: Susannah Ferreira writes that at the time of Joanna's birth, "there were no rumors of her mother's infidelity or her father's impotence." Such accusations first began to spread during the rebellion against Henry IV in 1464 and were first chronicled by Alfonso de Palencia under the patronage of Isabella in 1474. In 1946, an examination of Henry IV's skeleton performed by Gregorio Maranon and Manuel Gómez-Moreno Martínez revealed him to be "normally virile." However, there is no way to prove his biological relationship with Joanna because the monastery her remains were stored in was destroyed in the Lisbon earthquake of 1755.) Henry yielded to the demands of the nobles and designated Alfonso his successor, with the stipulation that the Infante eventually marry Joanna to ensure that they both would receive the crown.

However, Henry hesitated to fulfill all of the magnates' wishes, especially with regards to government reform, causing relations to sour. In February 1465, he renounced Alfonso as his heir and commanded Beltrán to mobilize a royal army. Civil war broke out in June 1465 after Carrillo, Pacheco, and other agitators conducted a ceremonial deposition-in-effigy of Henry outside the city of Avila and crowned Alfonso as a rival king. In 1467, the nobles clashed with Henry's forces at the Second Battle of Olmedo, which concluded as a draw. A month after the battle, rebels liberated Isabella from Henry's control and she returned to Arévalo to tend to her mother. Regarding his younger half-sister as a neutral party in the civil war, Henry decreed in November that Isabella could travel freely. Alfonso eventually joined his mother and sister in Arévalo and, in a document he signed as "King of Castile and León" on 8 December 1467, awarded Isabella the town of Medina del Campo.

Alfonso died at the age of fourteen in July 1468. The nobles who had supported him suspected poisoning. As she had been named in her brother's will as his successor, the nobles asked Isabella to take his place as champion of the rebellion. However, support for the rebels had begun to wane, and Isabella preferred a negotiated settlement to continuing the war. She met with Henry at Toros de Guisando and they reached a compromise: the war would stop, Henry would name Isabella his heir presumptive instead of his daughter Joanna, and Isabella would not marry without her half-brother's consent, but he would not be able to force her to marry against her will. Isabella's side came out with most of what the nobles desired, though they did not go so far as to officially depose King Henry; they were not powerful enough to do so, and Isabella did not want to jeopardize the principle of fair inherited succession, since it was upon this idea that she had based her argument for legitimacy as heir-presumptive.

=== Failed betrothals ===
The question of Isabella's marriage was not a new one. She had, at the age of six, a betrothal to Ferdinand, the younger son of John II of Navarre (whose family was a cadet branch of the House of Trastámara). At that time, the two kings, Henry and John, were eager to show their mutual love and confidence and they believed that this alliance would make their eternal friendship obvious to the world. This arrangement, however, did not last long.

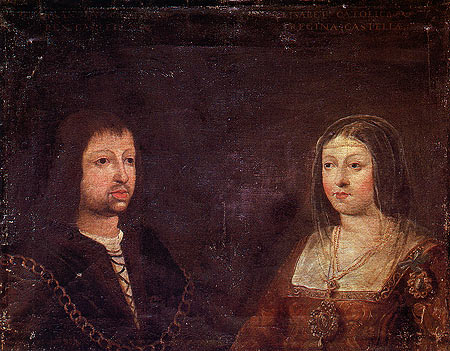
The wedding portrait of Ferdinand and Isabella, c. 1469

Ferdinand's uncle Alfonso V of Aragon died in 1458. All of Alfonso's Spanish territories, as well as the islands of Sicily and Sardinia, were left to his brother John II. John now had a stronger position than ever before and no longer needed the security of Henry's friendship. Henry was now in need of a new alliance. He saw the chance for this much-needed new friendship in Charles of Viana, John's elder son. Charles was constantly at odds with his father, and because of this, he secretly entered into an alliance with Henry IV of Castile. A major part of the alliance was that a marriage was to be arranged between Charles and Isabella. When John II learned of this arranged marriage, he was outraged. Isabella had been intended for his favorite younger son, Ferdinand, and in his eyes, this alliance was still valid. John II had his son Charles thrown in prison on charges of plotting against his father's life. Charles died in 1461.

In 1465, an attempt was made to marry Isabella to Afonso V of Portugal, Henry's brother-in-law. Through the medium of the queen and Count of Ledesma, a Portuguese alliance was made. Isabella, however, was wary of the marriage and refused to consent.

A civil war broke out in Castile over King Henry's inability to act as sovereign. Henry now needed a quick way to please the rebels of the kingdom. As part of an agreement to restore peace, Isabella was then to be betrothed to Pedro Girón Acuña Pacheco, Master of the Order of Calatrava and brother to the king's favorite, Juan Pacheco. In return, Don Pedro would pay into the royal treasury an enormous sum of money. Seeing no alternative, Henry agreed to the marriage. Isabella was aghast and prayed to God that the marriage would not come to pass. Her prayers were answered when Don Pedro suddenly fell ill and died while on his way to meet his fiancée.

When Henry had recognized Isabella as his heir-presumptive on 19 September 1468, he had also promised that his half-sister should not be compelled to marry against her will, while she in return had agreed to obtain his consent. It seemed that the years of failed attempts at political marriages were finally over. There was talk of a marriage to Edward IV of England or to one of his brothers, probably Richard, Duke of Gloucester, but this alliance was never seriously considered. Once again in 1468, a marriage proposal arrived from Afonso V of Portugal. Going against his promises made in September 1468, Henry tried to make the marriage a reality. If Isabella married Afonso, Henry's daughter Joanna would marry Afonso's son John II and thus, after the death of the old king, John and Joanna could inherit Portugal and Castile. Isabella refused and made a secret promise to marry her cousin and very first betrothed, Ferdinand of Aragon.

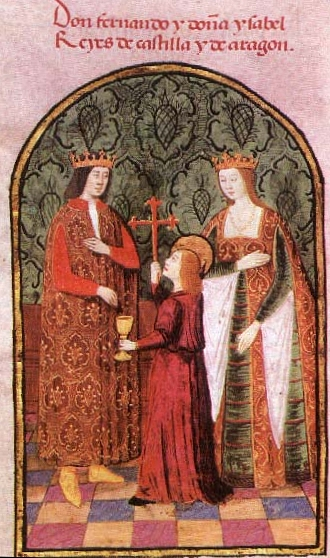
Ferdinand and Isabella

After this failed attempt, Henry once again went against his promises and tried to marry Isabella to Louis XI's brother Charles, Duke of Berry. In Henry's eyes, this alliance would cement the friendship of Castile and France as well as remove Isabella from Castilian affairs. However, Isabella once again refused the proposal. Meanwhile, John II of Aragon negotiated in secret with Isabella a wedding to his son Ferdinand.

=== Marriage ===
On 18 October 1469, the formal betrothal took place without Henry's knowledge. Because Isabella and Ferdinand were second cousins, they stood within the prohibited degrees of consanguinity and the marriage would not be legal unless a dispensation from the Pope was obtained. With the help of the Valencian Cardinal Rodrigo Borgia (later Pope Alexander VI), Isabella and Ferdinand were presented with a supposed papal bull by Pope Pius II (who had actually died in 1464), authorizing Ferdinand to marry within the third degree of consanguinity, making their marriage legal. Afraid of opposition, Isabella eloped from the court of Henry with the excuse of visiting her brother Alfonso's tomb in Ávila. Ferdinand, on the other hand, crossed Castile in secret disguised as a servant. They married immediately upon reuniting on 19 October 1469 in the Palacio de los Vivero in the city of Valladolid.

Henry IV denounced the marriage and issued a proclamation stating that by marrying without his permission, Isabella violated the Treaty of Guisando and was therefore no longer his successor. Regarding the treaty as nullified, he declared in October 1470 that Joanna was his true daughter and proper heir to the throne.

== Coronation and the war with Portugal ==
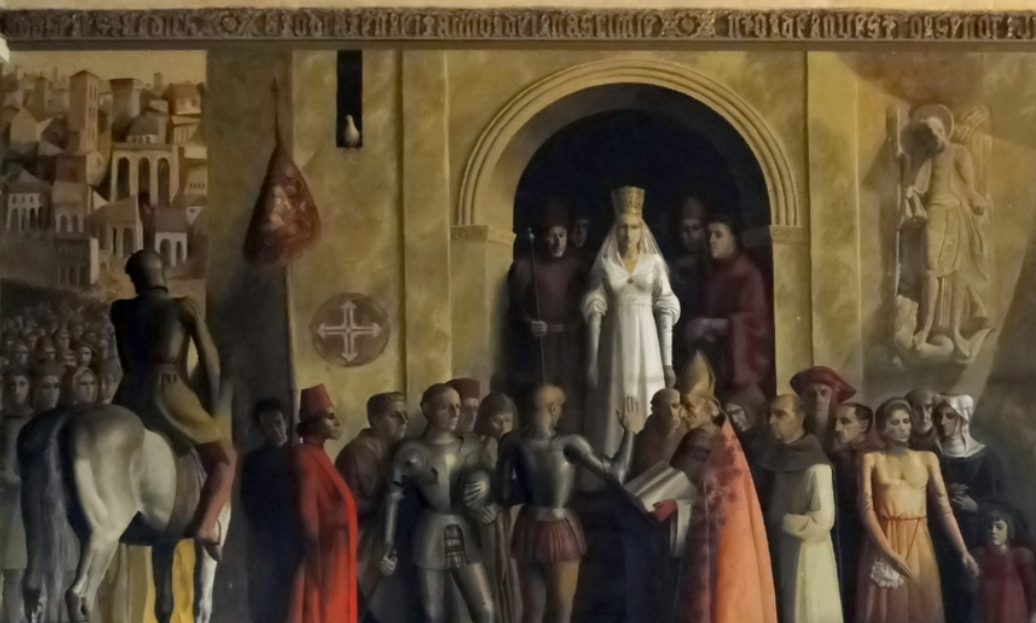
The Proclamation of Queen Isabella

On 12 December 1474, news of King Henry IV's death in Madrid (which had happened on 11 December) reached Segovia. This prompted Isabella to take refuge within the walls of the Alcázar of Segovia, where she received the support of Andres de Cabrera and Segovia's council. The next day, Isabella was proclaimed Queen of Castile and León. When she arrived in Ávila and was similarly proclaimed queen there, she was welcomed by members of the Jewish community, who greeted her with Torah scrolls, trumpets, and drums.

Isabella's reign got off to a rocky start. King Henry IV did not name a successor on his deathbed, so when Isabella ascended to the throne in 1474, there were already several plots against her. Diego Pacheco, the Marquis of Villena, and his followers maintained that Joanna la Beltraneja, Henry's daughter, was the rightful queen. Shortly after the Marquis made his claim, the Archbishop of Toledo—his great-uncle and a longtime supporter of Isabella—left court to plot with him. They made plans to have Joanna marry her uncle King Afonso V of Portugal and invade Castile to claim the throne for themselves.

Western Europe in 1470

In May 1475, King Afonso and his army crossed into Spain and advanced to Plasencia. Here he married the young Joanna. A long and bloody war for the Castilian succession then took place. The war went back and forth for almost a year, until the Battle of Toro on 1 March 1476, in which both sides claimed and celebrated victory: the troops of King Afonso V were beaten by the Castilian centre-left commanded by the Duke of Alba and Cardinal Mendoza while the forces led by John of Portugal defeated the Castilian right wing and remained in possession of the battlefield.

But despite its uncertain outcome, the Battle of Toro represented a great political victory for the Catholic Monarchs, assuring them the throne since the supporters of Joanna la Beltraneja disbanded and the Portuguese army, without allies, left Castile. As summarized by the historian Justo L. González:

Both armies faced each other at the camps of Toro resulting in an indecisive battle. But while the Portuguese King reorganized his troops, Ferdinand sent news to all the cities of Castile and to several foreign kingdoms informing them about a huge victory where the Portuguese were crushed. Faced with these news, the party of "la Beltraneja" [Joanna] was dissolved and the Portuguese were forced to return to their kingdom.

With great political vision, Isabella took advantage of the moment and convoked courts at Madrigal-Segovia (April–October 1476) where her eldest child and daughter Isabella was first sworn as heiress to Castile's crown. That was equivalent to legitimizing Isabella's own throne.

In August of the same year, Isabella proved her abilities as a powerful ruler on her own. A rebellion broke out in Segovia, and Isabella rode out to suppress it, as her husband Ferdinand was off fighting at the time. Going against the advice of her male advisors, Isabella rode by herself into the city to negotiate with the rebels. She was successful and the rebellion was quickly brought to an end. Two years later, Isabella further secured her place as ruler with the birth of her son John, Prince of Asturias, on 30 June 1478. To many, the presence of a male heir legitimized her place as ruler.

Meanwhile, the Castilian and Portuguese fleets fought for hegemony in the Atlantic Ocean and for the wealth of Guinea (gold and slaves), where the decisive naval Battle of Guinea was fought.

=== End of the war and consequences ===
The war dragged on for another three years and ended with a Castilian victory on land and a Portuguese victory on the sea. The four separate peace treaties signed at Alcáçovas (4 September 1479) reflected that result: Portugal gave up the throne of Castile in favor of Isabella in exchange for a very favorable share of the Atlantic territories disputed with Castile (they all went to Portugal with the exception of the Canary Islands: Guinea with its mines of gold, Cape Verde, Madeira, Azores, and the right of conquest over the Kingdom of Fez) plus a large war compensation: 106.676 dobles of gold. The Catholic Monarchs also had to accept that Joanna la Beltraneja remain in Portugal instead of Spain and to pardon all rebellious subjects who had supported Joanna and King Afonso. And the Catholic Monarchs – who had proclaimed themselves rulers of Portugal and donated lands to noblemen inside this country – had to give up the Portuguese crown.

At Alcáçovas, Isabella and Ferdinand had secured the throne, but the Portuguese exclusive right of navigation and commerce in all of the Atlantic Ocean south of the Canary Islands meant that Spain was practically blocked out of the Atlantic and was deprived of the gold of Guinea, which induced anger in Andalusia. Spanish academic Antonio Rumeu de Armas claims that with the peace treaty of Alcáçovas in 1479, the Catholic Monarchs "... buy the peace at an excessively expensive price ..." and historian Mª Monserrat León Guerrero added that they "... find themselves forced to abandon their expansion by the Atlantic ...".

==== The Columbus gambit ====
Christopher Columbus freed Castile from this difficult situation, because his New World discovery led to a new and much more balanced sharing of the Atlantic at Tordesillas in 1494. As the orders received by Columbus in his first voyage (1492) show: "[the Catholic Monarchs] have always in mind that the limits signed in the share of Alcáçovas should not be overcome, and thus they insist with Columbus to sail along the parallel of Canary." Thus, by sponsoring the Columbian adventure to the west, the Spanish monarchs were trying the only remaining path of expansion. Now that she had succeeded in securing her place on the Castilian throne, she could begin to institute the reforms that she planned for the kingdom.

== Reign ==
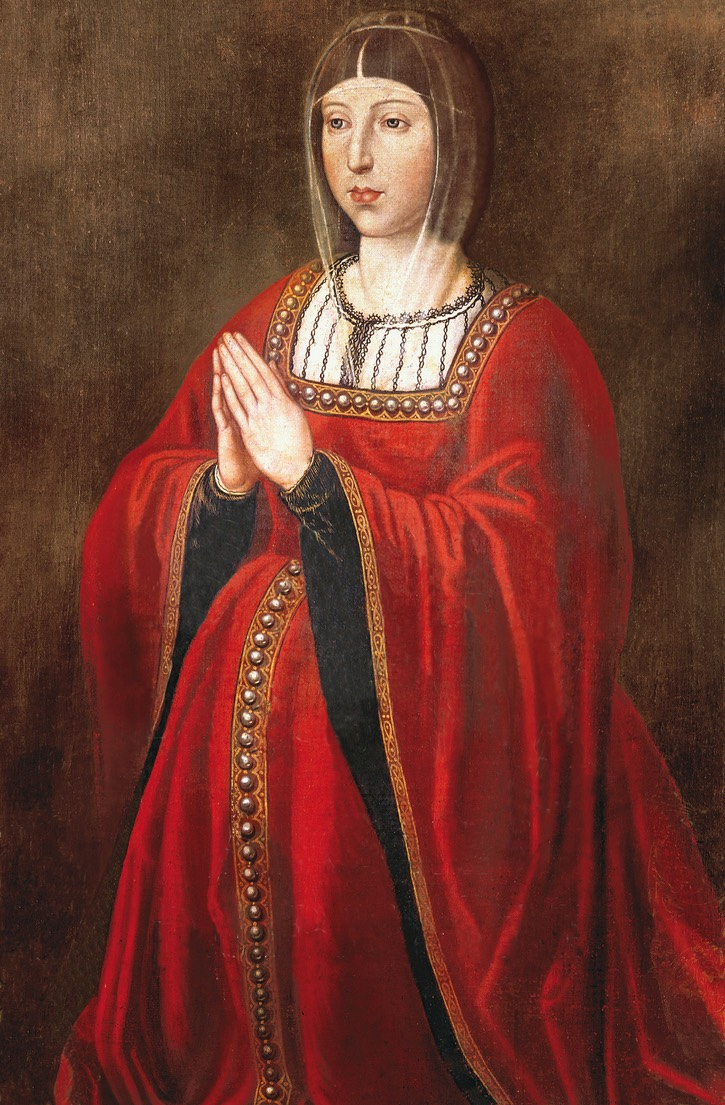
Portrait of Isabella at Casa de los Tiros in Granada

On 13 December 1474, in Segovia's main square, Isabella pledged to uphold the Church's commandments, protect the integrity of Castile, and respect the rights of the nobility and towns. She was then formally proclaimed queen of Castile by the assembly.

=== Regulation of crime ===
When Isabella came to the throne in 1474, Castile was in a state of despair due to her brother Henry's reign. It was known that Henry IV was a big spender and did little to enforce the laws of his kingdom. It was even said by one Castilian denizen of the time that murder, rape, and robbery happened without punishment. Because of this, Isabella needed desperately to find a way to reform her kingdom. Due to the measures she imposed, historians during her lifetime saw her to be more inclined to justice than to mercy, and indeed far more rigorous and unforgiving than her husband Ferdinand.

==== La Santa Hermandad ====
Isabella's first major reform came during the cortes of Madrigal in 1476 in the form of a police force, La Santa Hermandad (the Holy Brotherhood). Up until then, during the late medieval period, the expression hermandad had been used to describe groups of men who came together of their own accord to regulate law and order by patrolling the roads and countryside and punishing malefactors. These brotherhoods were often suppressed by the monarchs and the justice system, in most parts of the country, was under the control of the nobility instead of royal officials.

Isabella brought these brotherhoods under royal authority. Thus, for the first time, the Hermandad was a police force used by the crown. They were established for Castile, Leon, and Asturias. The police force was to be made up of locals who were to regulate the crime occurring in the kingdom. It was to be paid for by a tax of 1800 maravedís on every one hundred households. In 1477, Isabella visited Extremadura and Andalusia to introduce this more efficient police force there as well.

==== Other criminal reforms ====
Keeping with her reformation of the regulation of laws, in 1481 Isabella charged two officials with restoring peace in Galicia. This turbulent province had been the prey of tyrant nobles since the days of Isabella's father, John II. Robbers had infested the highways and oppressed the smaller towns and villages. The officials Isabella charged with restoring peace for the province were ultimately successful. Indeed, they drove over 1,500 robbers from Galicia.

==== Finances ====
From the very beginning of her reign, Isabella fully grasped the importance of restoring the Crown's finances. The reign of Henry IV had left the Kingdom of Castile in great debt. Upon examination, it was found that the chief cause of the nation's poverty was the wholesale alienation of royal estates during Henry's reign. To make money, Henry had sold off royal estates at prices well below their value. The Cortes of Toledo of 1480 came to the conclusion that the only hope of lasting financial reform lay in a resumption of these alienated lands and rents. This decision was warmly approved by many leading nobles of the court, but Isabella was reluctant to take such drastic measures. It was decided that the Archbishop of Toledo would hold an enquiry into the tenure of estates and rents acquired during Henry IV's reign. Those that had not been granted as a reward for services were to be restored without compensation, while those that had been sold at a price far below their real value were to be bought back at the same sum. While many of the nobility were forced to pay large sums of money for their estates, the royal treasury became even richer. Isabella's one stipulation was that there would be no revocation of gifts made to churches, hospitals, or the poor.

Another issue of money was the overproduction of coinage and the abundance of mints in the kingdom. During Henry's reign, the number of mints regularly producing money had increased from just five to 150. Much of the coinage produced in these mints was nearly worthless. During the first year of her reign, Isabella established a monopoly over the royal mints and fixed a legal standard to which the coinage had to approximate. By shutting down many of the mints and taking royal control over the production of money, Isabella restored the confidence of the public in the Crown's ability to handle the kingdom's finances.

==== Government ====
Both Isabella and Ferdinand established very few new governmental and administrative institutions in their respective kingdoms. Especially in Castile, their main achievement was to use more effectively the institutions that had existed during the reigns of John II and Henry IV. Historically, the center of the Castilian government had been the royal household, together with its surrounding court. The household was traditionally divided into two overlapping bodies. The first body was made up of household officials, mainly people of the nobility, who carried out governmental and political functions for which they received special payment. The second body was made up of some 200 permanent servants or continos who performed a wide range of confidential functions on behalf of the rulers. By the 1470s, when Isabella began to take a firm grip on the royal administration, the senior offices of the royal household were simply honorary titles and held strictly by the nobility. The positions of a more secretarial nature were often held by senior churchmen. Substantial revenues were attached to such offices and were therefore enjoyed greatly, on an effectively hereditary basis, by the great Castilian houses of nobility. While the nobles held the titles, individuals of lesser breeding did the real work.

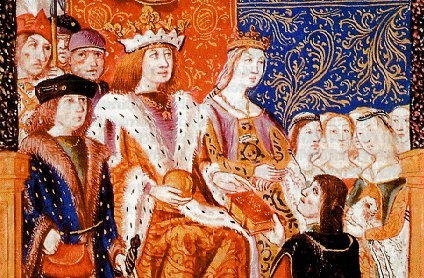
Ferdinand and Isabella with their subjects

Traditionally, the main advisory body to the rulers of Castile was the Royal Council. The council, under the monarch, had full power to resolve all legal and political disputes. The council was responsible for supervising all senior administrative officials, such as the Crown representatives in all of the major towns. It was also the supreme judicial tribunal of the kingdom. In 1480, during the Cortes of Toledo, Isabella made many reforms to the Royal Council. Previously there had been two distinct yet overlapping categories of royal councillor. One formed a group which possessed both judicial and administrative responsibilities. This portion consisted of some bishops, some nobles, and an increasingly important element of professional administrators with legal training known as letrados. The second category of traditional councillor had a less formal role. This role depended greatly on the individuals' political influence and personal influence with the monarch. During Isabella's reign, the role of this second category was eliminated. As mentioned previously, Isabella had little care for personal bribes or favors. Because of this, this second type of councillor, usually of the nobility, was only allowed to attend the council of Castile as an observer.

Isabella began to rely more on the professional administrators than ever before. These men were mostly of the bourgeoisie or lesser nobility. The council was also rearranged and it was officially settled that one bishop, three caballeros, and eight or nine lawyers would serve on the council at a time. While the nobles were no longer directly involved in the matters of state, they were welcome to attend the meetings. Isabella hoped that forcing the nobility to choose whether to participate or not would weed out those who were not dedicated to the state and its cause.

Isabella also saw the need to provide a personal relationship between herself as the monarch and her subjects. Therefore, Isabella and Ferdinand set aside a time every Friday during which they themselves would sit and allow people to come to them with complaints. This was a new form of personal justice that Castile had not seen before. The Council of State was reformed and presided over by the king and queen. This department of public affairs dealt mainly with foreign negotiations, hearing embassies, and transacting business with the Court of Rome. In addition to these departments, there was also a Supreme Court of the Santa Hermandad, a Council of Finance, and a Council for settling purely Aragonese matters. Although Isabella made many reforms that seem to have made the Cortes stronger, in actuality the Cortes lost political power during the reigns of Isabella and Ferdinand. Isabella and her husband moved in the direction of a non-parliamentary government and the Cortes became an almost passive advisory body, giving automatic assent to legislation which had been drafted by the royal administration.

After the reforms of the Cortes of Toledo, the queen ordered a noted jurist, Alfonso Diaz de Montalvo, to undertake the task of clearing away legal rubbish and compiling what remained into a comprehensive code. Within four years the work stood completed in eight bulky volumes and the Ordenanzas Reales took their place on legal bookshelves.

=== Events of 1492 ===
==== Granada ====
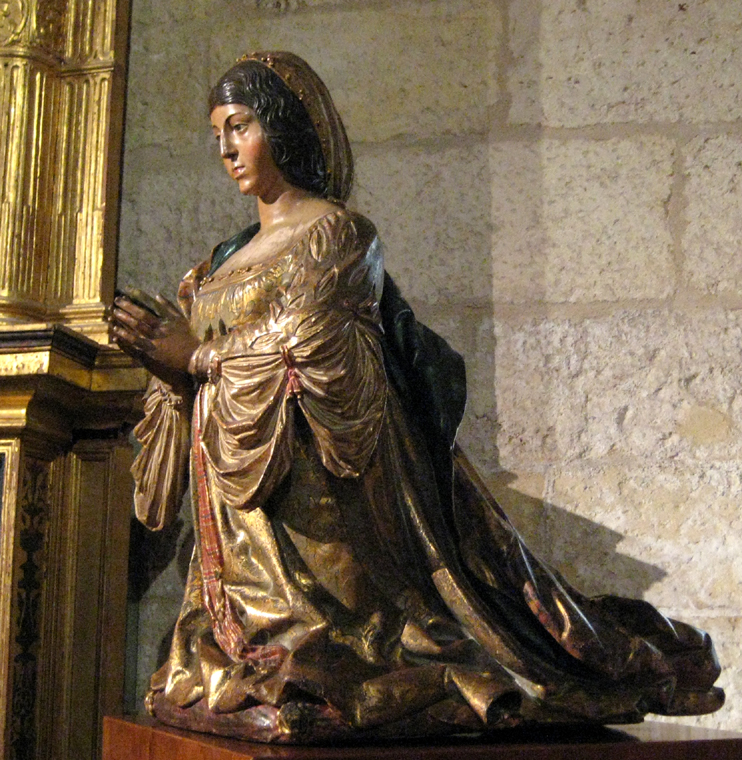
Statue of Isabella by Felipe Bigarny; it resides in the Capilla Real, in Granada.

At the end of the Reconquista, only Granada was left for Isabella and Ferdinand to conquer. The Emirate of Granada had been held by the Muslim Nasrid dynasty since the mid-13th century. Protected by natural barriers and fortified towns, it had withstood the long process of the Reconquista. On 1 February 1482, the king and queen reached Medina del Campo and this is generally considered the beginning of the Granada War. While Isabella's and Ferdinand's involvement in the war was apparent from the start, Granada's leadership was divided and never able to present a united front. It still took ten years to conquer Granada, however, culminating in 1492.

The Spanish monarchs recruited soldiers from many European countries and improved their artillery with the latest and best cannon. Systematically, they proceeded to take the kingdom piece by piece. In 1485 they laid siege to Ronda, which surrendered after only a fortnight due to extensive bombardment. The following year, Loja was taken, and again Muhammad XI was captured and released. One year later, with the fall of Málaga, the western part of the Muslim Nasrid kingdom had fallen into Spanish hands. The eastern province succumbed after the fall of Baza in 1489. The siege of Granada began in the spring of 1491 and Muhammad XI finally surrendered at the end of the year. On 2 January 1492, Isabella and Ferdinand entered Granada to receive the keys of the city and the principal mosque was consecrated as a church. The Treaty of Granada was signed later that year; in it, Ferdinand and Isabella gave their word to allow the Muslims and Jews of Granada to live in peace.

During the war, Isabella noted the abilities and energy of Gonzalo Fernández de Córdoba and made him one of the two commissioners for the negotiations. Under her patronage, De Córdoba went on to an extraordinary military career that revolutionized the organization and tactics of the emerging Spanish military, changing the nature of warfare and altering the European balance of power.

==== Columbus and Portuguese relations ====
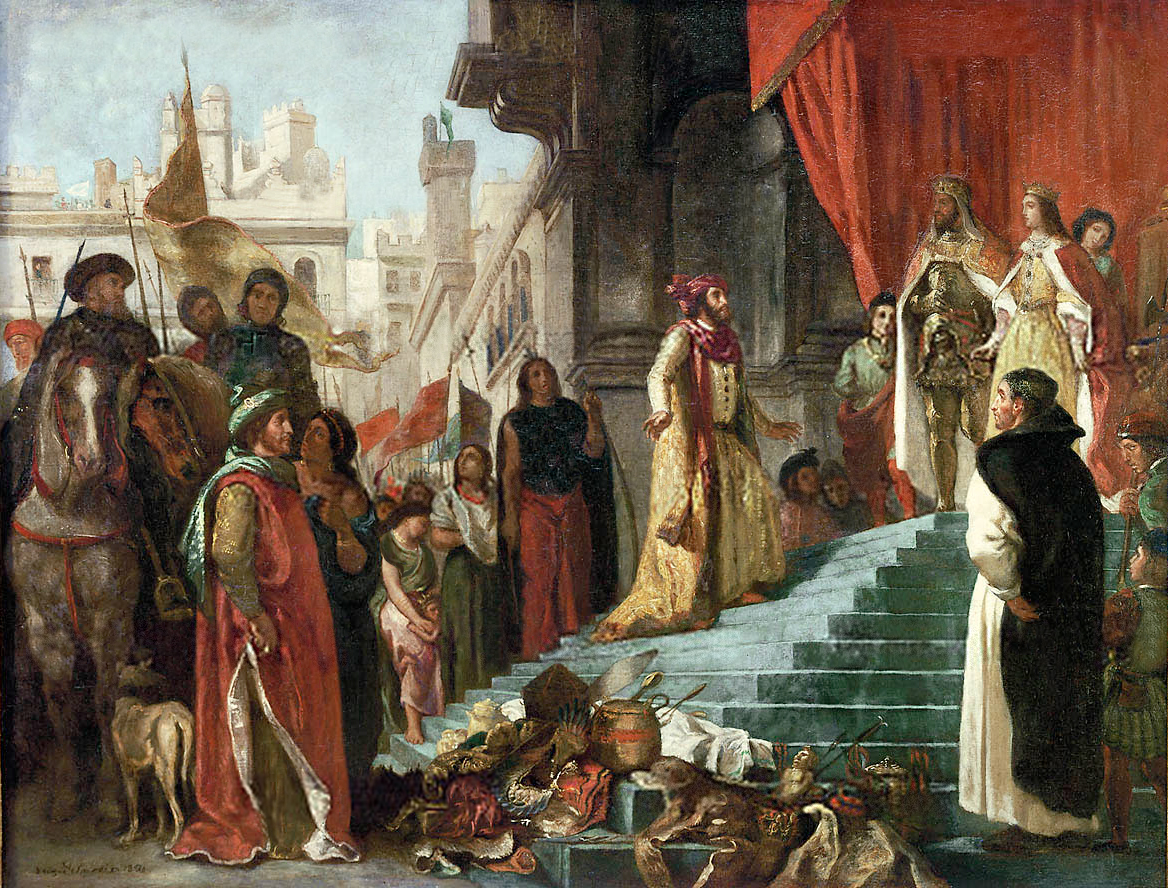
The return of Christopher Columbus; his audience before King Ferdinand and Queen Isabella

Just three months after entering Granada, Queen Isabella agreed to sponsor Christopher Columbus on an expedition to reach the East Indies by sailing west (for a distance of 2,000 miles, according to Columbus). The crown agreed to pay a sum of money as a concession from monarch to subject.

Columbus's expedition departed on 3 August 1492, and arrived in the New World on 12 October. He returned the next year and presented his findings to the monarchs, bringing natives and gold under a hero's welcome. Although Columbus was sponsored by the Castilian queen, treasury accounts show no royal payments to him until 1493, after his first voyage was complete. Spain then entered a Golden Age of exploration and colonization—the period of the Spanish Empire. In 1494, by the Treaty of Tordesillas, Isabella and Ferdinand agreed to divide the Earth, outside of Europe, with King John II of Portugal. The Portuguese did not recognize that South America belonged to the Spanish because it was in Portugal's sphere of influence, and King John II threatened to send an army to claim the land for the Portuguese.

Beyond her support for Columbus, Queen Isabella also played a pivotal role in shaping the Spanish linguistic legacy in the New World. In 1492, she endorsed the first grammar of the Castilian language titled Gramática de la lengua castellana, written by Elio Antonio de Nebrija, the father of Spanish grammar. This grammar was intended to spread the Spanish language across the newly discovered lands, aligning with Spain's imperial ambitions, as Nebrija himself declared it would teach the language to the inhabitants of these territories.

==== Position on slavery ====
Isabella was not in favor of enslaving the American natives. She established the royal position on how the indigenous people should be treated by following the recent policies implemented in the Canary Islands (which had a small number of native inhabitants), which stated that all peoples were subjects of the Crown of Castile, and could not be enslaved in most situations. She was annoyed by the enslavement of the natives by Columbus, and established a royal position on how the indigenous shall be treated. There were some circumstances in which a person could be enslaved, including being a prisoner of war, or for practising cannibalism or sodomy.

After an episode in which Columbus captured 1,200 men, Isabella ordered their return and the arrest of Columbus, who was insulted in the streets of Granada. Isabella realized that she could not trust all the conquest and evangelization to take place through one man, so she opened the range for other expeditions led by Alonso de Hojeda, Juan de la Cosa, Vicente Yáñez Pinzón, Diego de Lepe or Pedro Alonso Niño.

To prevent her efforts from being reversed in the future, Isabella instructed her descendants in her last will as follows: "do not give rise to or allow the Indians [indigenous Americans] to receive any wrong in their persons and property, but rather that they be treated well and fairly, and if they have received any wrong, remedy it."

==== Expulsion of the Jews ====
With the institution of the Catholic Inquisition in Spain, and with the Dominican friar Tomás de Torquemada as the first Inquisitor General, the Catholic Monarchs pursued a policy of religious and national unity. Though Isabella opposed taking harsh measures against Jews on economic grounds, Torquemada was able to convince Ferdinand. On 31 March 1492, the Alhambra decree for the expulsion of the Jews was issued. The Jews had until the end of July (four months) to leave the country and they were not to take with them gold, silver, money, arms, or horses. Traditionally, it had been claimed that as many as 200,000 Jews left Spain, but recent historians have shown that such figures are exaggerated: Henry Kamen has shown that out of a total population of 80,000 Jews, a maximum of 40,000 left and the rest converted. Hundreds of those that remained came under the Inquisition's investigations into relapsed conversos (Marranos) and the Judaizers who had been abetting them.

=== Later years ===
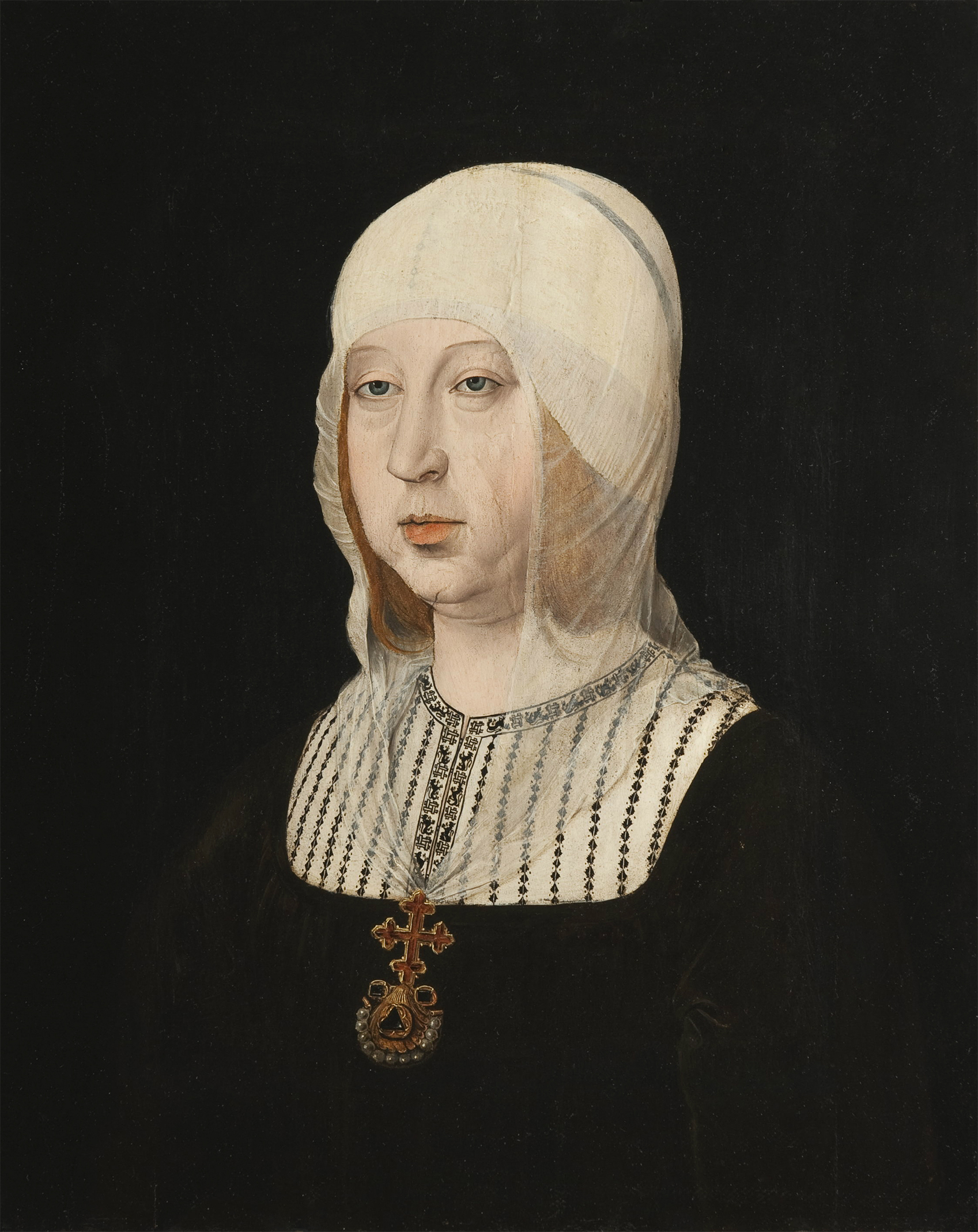
Isabella I of Castile by Juan de Flandes (c. 1500–1504)

Isabella was given the title of Catholic Monarch by Pope Alexander VI, of whose behavior and involvement in matters Isabella did not approve. Along with the physical unification of Spain, Isabella and Ferdinand embarked on a process of religious unification, trying to bring the country under their own Catholic faith. As part of this process, the Inquisition became institutionalized. After a Muslim uprising in 1499 triggered by their policy of forced conversions, and further troubles thereafter, the Catholic Monarchs broke the Treaty of Granada in 1502, and Muslims were ordered to either become Christians or to leave. Isabella's inflexible confessor, Cisneros, was named Archbishop of Toledo. He was instrumental in a program of rehabilitation of the religious institutions of Spain, laying the groundwork for the later Counter-Reformation. As Chancellor, he exerted more and more power.

Isabella and her husband had created an empire and in later years were consumed with administration and politics; they were concerned with the succession and worked to link the Spanish crown to the other rulers in Europe. By early 1497, all the pieces seemed to be in place: The son and heir John, Prince of Asturias, married a Habsburg princess, Margaret of Austria, establishing the connection to the House of Habsburg. The eldest daughter, Isabella of Aragon, married King Manuel I of Portugal, and the younger daughter, Joanna of Castile, was married to Margaret of Austria's brother, Philip of Austria. In 1500, Isabella granted all non-rebellious natives in the colonies citizenship and full legal freedom by decree.

However, Isabella's plans for her eldest two children did not work out. Her only son, John of Asturias, died shortly after his marriage. Her daughter, Isabella of Aragon, died during the birth of her son, Miguel da Paz, who died shortly after, at the age of two. Queen Isabella I's crowns passed to her third child, Joanna, and her son-in-law, Philip I.

Isabella did, however, make successful dynastic matches for her two youngest daughters. The death of Isabella of Aragon created a necessity for Manuel I of Portugal to remarry, and Isabella's third daughter, Maria of Aragon and Castile, became his next bride. Isabella's youngest daughter, Catherine of Aragon, married England's Arthur, Prince of Wales, but his early death resulted in her being married to his younger brother, King Henry VIII of England.

=== Women in the court of Queen Isabella I of Castile ===
Isabella cultivated a court consisting of important women known by their contemporaries as "puellae doctae" (learned girls). Queen Isabella of Castile made Catalina de Medrano y Bravo de Lagunas her lady-in-waiting in 1497 and shortly after became the patron and protector of the first female professor in Europe, Luisa de Medrano. Luisa de Medrano's intellectual abilities and solid formation caught the attention of the Queen and enabled her to teach Latin at the University of Salamanca. She received the chair left by Antonio de Nebrija (Antonio Martínez de Cala) in 1508 (Poetry and Grammar), although it is not known how long she maintained the post. Under the protection of Queen Isabel I, Luisa de Medrano learned history, culture and humanist philosophy alongside children of the royal family. Luisa de Medrano not only received a privileged and nurtured education with the royal daughters, Isabel and Juana, she undoubtedly benefited from living in the climate of tolerance and advancement for women that Isabel I actively cultivated in her court, and which disappeared after her death.

== Death ==
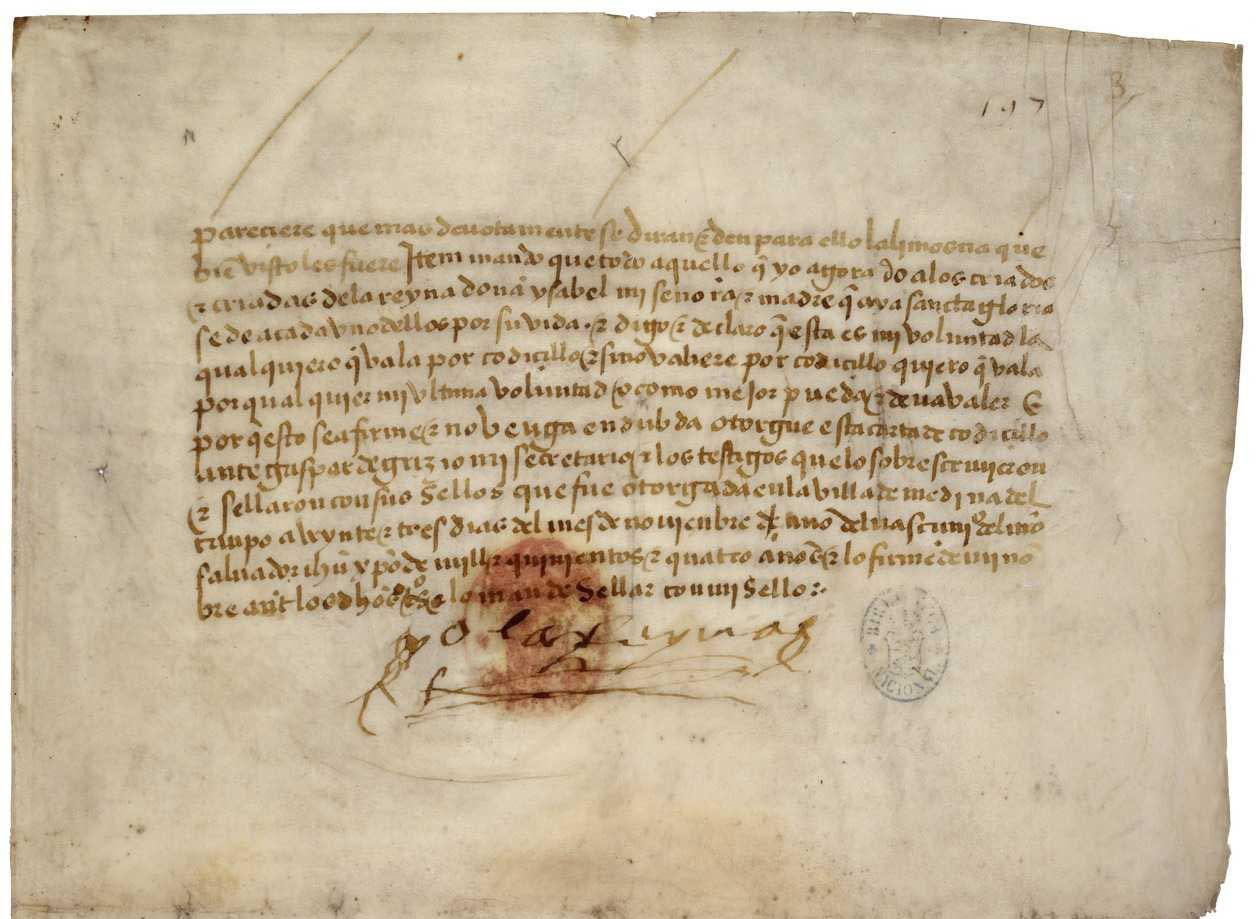
"Will of Isabella I"

Isabella officially withdrew from governmental affairs on 14 September 1504 and she died that same year on 26 November at the Medina del Campo Royal Palace of uterine cancer, leading to dropsy and fluid retention. She had already been in decline since the deaths of her son Prince John of Asturias in 1497, her mother Isabella of Portugal in 1496, and her daughter Princess Isabella of Asturias in 1498. She is entombed in Granada in the Capilla Real (built by her grandson, Charles V, Holy Roman Emperor), alongside her husband Ferdinand, her daughter Joanna, and other relatives. She requested that the body of her daughter Isabella be moved to rest by her side in Granada, but this was never done. The museum next to the Capilla Real holds her crown and sceptre.

== Appearance and personality ==
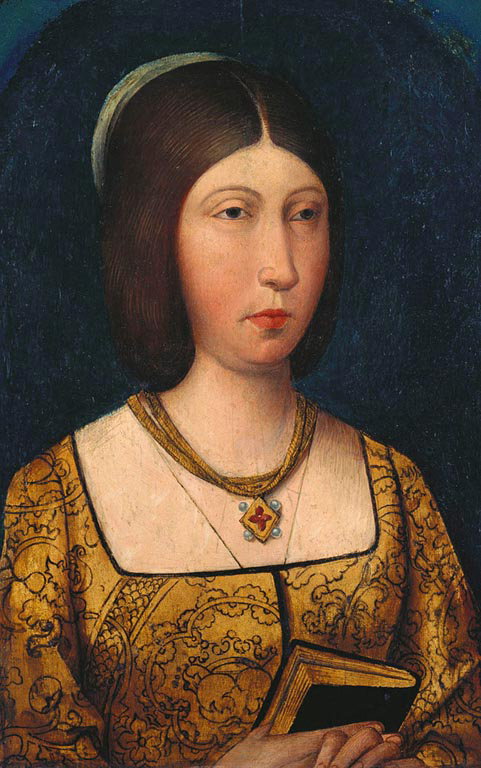
Isabella depicted with darker hair, c. 1485

Isabella was short but of strong stocky build, of a very fair complexion, and had a hair color that was between strawberry-blonde and auburn. Other descriptions, however, describe her hair as golden (blonde), and period illuminations show her several times with golden or strawberry-blond hair. Some portraits show her as a brunette. The statue of her in Granada Cathedral, by Burgundian sculptor Philippe de Vigarny (born in Langres, in what is now France), also shows her as a dark-haired brunette. Her daughters Joanna and Catherine were thought to resemble her the most in looks - both are similarly described in contemporary sources as having auburn hair, but surviving paintings often show them as brunettes due to the same pigmentation problem.

Isabella maintained an austere, temperate lifestyle, and her religious spirit influenced her the most in life. In spite of her hostility towards the Muslims in Andalusia, Isabella developed a taste for Moorish decor and style.

Isabella's contemporaries described her as follows:

- Gonzalo Fernández de Oviedo y Valdés: "To see her speak was divine."
- Andrés Bernáldez: She was "very powerful, very prudent, wise, very honest, chaste, devout, discreet, truthful, clear, without deceit. Who could count the excellences of this very Catholic and happy Queen, always very worthy of praises."
- Hernando del Pulgar: "She was very inclined to justice, so much so that she was reputed to follow more the path of rigor than that of mercy, and did so to remedy the great corruption of crimes that she found in the kingdom when she succeeded to the throne."
- Lucio Marineo Sículo: "[The royal knight Álvaro Yáñez de Lugo] was condemned to be beheaded, although he offered forty thousand ducados for the war against the Moors to the court so that these monies spare his life. This matter was discussed with the queen, and there were some who told her to pardon him, since these funds for the war were better than the death of that man, and her highness should take them. But the queen, preferring justice to cash, very prudently refused them; and although she could have confiscated all his goods, which were many, she did not take any of them to avoid any note of greed, or that it be thought that she had not wished to pardon him in order to have his goods; instead, she gave them all to the children of the aforesaid knight."
- Ferdinand, in his testament, declared that "she was exemplary in all acts of virtue and of fear of God."
- Fray Francisco Jiménez de Cisneros, her confessor and the Grand Inquisitor, praised "her purity of heart, her big heart and the grandness of her soul".

== Family ==
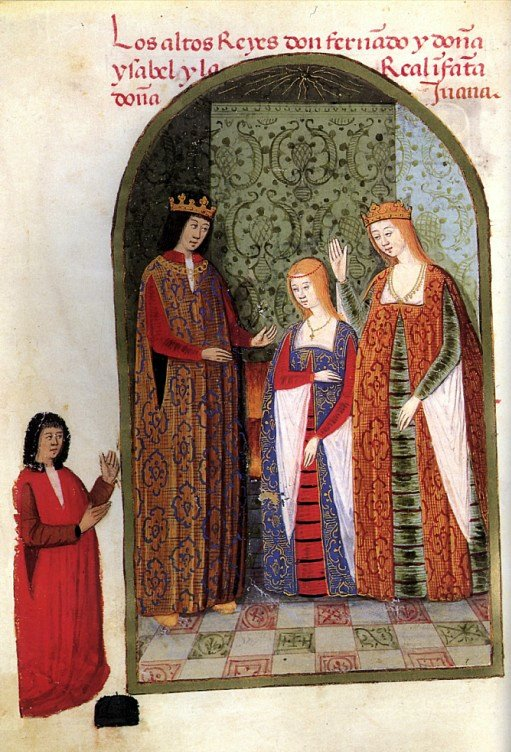
Isabella and Ferdinand with their daughter, Joanna, c. 1482

Isabella and Ferdinand had seven children, five of whom survived to adulthood:

- Isabella (1470–1498) married, firstly, to Afonso, Prince of Portugal, no issue. Married, secondly, to Manuel I of Portugal, had Miguel da Paz, who died before his second birthday.
- A son, miscarried on 31 May 1475 in Cebreros
- John (1478–1497), Prince of Asturias. Married Archduchess Margaret of Austria, no surviving issue.
- Joanna (1479–1555), Queen of Castile. Married Philip the Handsome, had issue.
- Maria (1482–1517), married Manuel I of Portugal, her sister's widower, had issue.
- Stillborn twin of Maria. Born on 1 July 1482 at dawn, sources conflict on gender.
- Catherine of Aragon (1485–1536), married, first, Arthur, Prince of Wales, no issue; secondly, his younger brother, Henry VIII of England, had Henry, Duke of Cornwall and Mary I of England.

== Veneration ==
Servant of God Isabella I
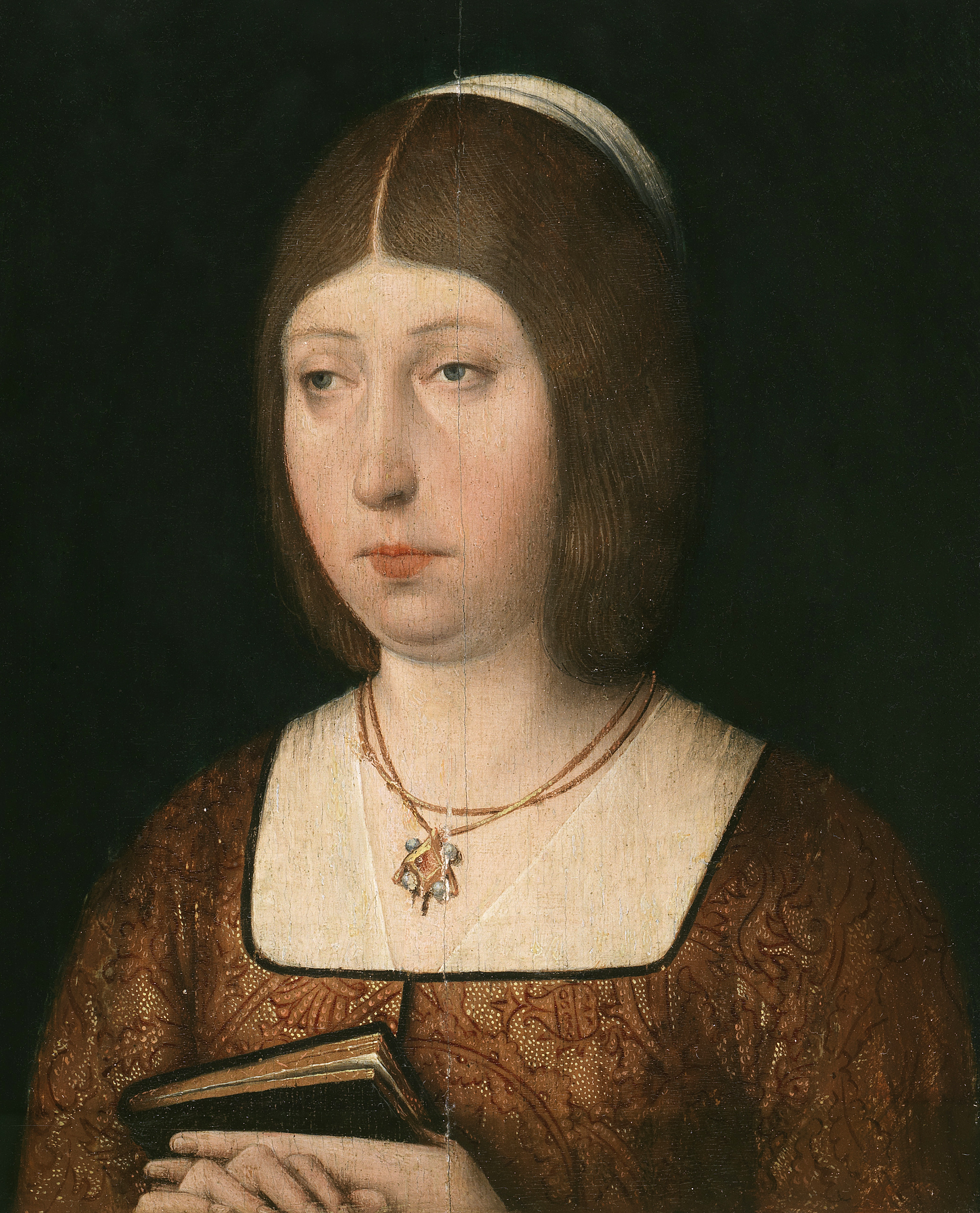
- Anonymous portrait of Isabella I, c. 1490
- Born: 22 April 1451; Madrigal de las Altas Torres, Ávila, Castile
- Died: 26 November 1504 (aged 53); Medina del Campo, Valladolid, Castile

In 1958, José García Goldaraz, the Bishop of Valladolid where she died in 1504, opened a sainthood cause for Isabella. Three-and-a-half thousand documents were chosen to be included in 27 volumes for the purpose of explicating her life.

In 1970, that commission determined that:

A Canonical process for the beatification of Isabella the Catholic could be undertaken with a sense of security since there was not found one single act, public or private, of Queen Isabella that was not inspired by Christian and evangelical criteria; moreover there was a 'reputation of sanctity' uninterrupted for five centuries and as the investigation was progressing, it was more accentuated."

In 1972, the documents were officially submitted to the Congregation for the Causes of Saints at the Vatican. This process was approved and Isabel was given the title Servant of God in March 1974. However, her beatification cause was suspended in 1991 by Pope John Paul II, one year before the commemoration of the fifth centenary of the discovery of the New World, due to her expulsion of the Jews. Some authors have claimed that Isabella's reputation for sanctity derives in large measure from an image carefully shaped and disseminated by the queen herself.

== Arms ==
As Princess of Asturias, Isabella bore the undifferenced royal arms of the Crown of Castile and added the Eagle of Saint John the Evangelist, an eagle displayed as single supporter. As queen, she quartered the Royal Arms of the Crown of Castile with the Royal Arms of the Crown of Aragon, she and Ferdinand II of Aragon adopted a yoke and a bundle of arrows as heraldic badges. As co-monarchs, Isabella and Ferdinand used the motto "Tanto Monta" ("They amount to the same", or "Equal opposites in balance"), which refers to their prenuptial agreement. The conquest of Granada in 1492 was symbolized by the addition enté en point of a quarter with a pomegranate for Granada (in Spanish, Granada means pomegranate). There was an uncommon variant with the eagle of Saint John the Evangelist and two lions adopted as Castilian royal supporters by John II, Isabella's father.

Coat of arms as Princess of Asturias
(1468–1474)

Coat of arms as queen
(1474–1492)

Coat of arms as queen
(1492–1504)

Coat of arms as queen with Castilian royal supporters (1492–1504)

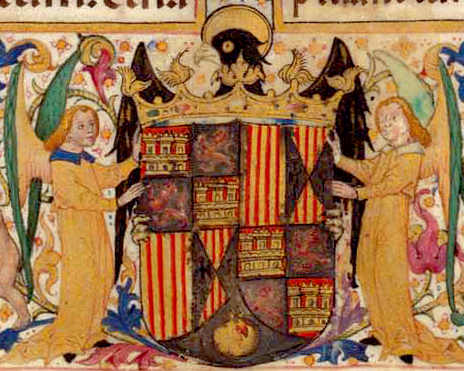
Coat of arms of Isabella I of Castile depicted in the manuscript from 1495 Breviary of Isabella the Catholic

== Legacy and popular culture ==
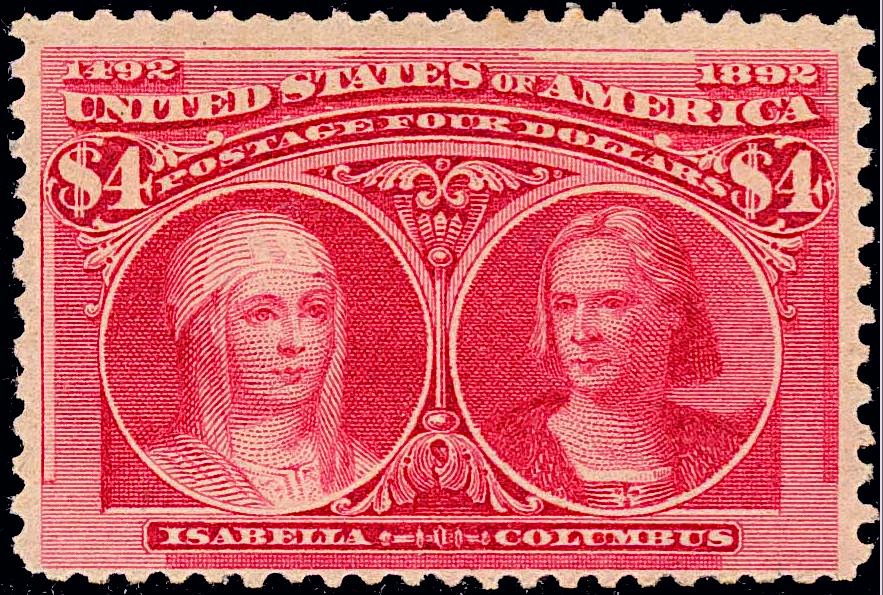
Queen Isabella ~ Christopher Columbus Issue of 1893

Outside of Europe, Isabella is most remembered for enabling Christopher Columbus's voyage to the New World, which ushered in an era of great wealth for Spain and Europe. Her reign saw the establishment of the Spanish Empire, which in turn ultimately led to creation of most of the nations that occupy the Americas today.

Within Europe, Isabella and her husband notably completed the Reconquista, driving out the most significant Muslim influence in Western Europe and firmly establishing Spain and the Iberian peninsula as staunchly Catholic. Her reign also saw the dawn of the infamous Spanish Inquisition.

=== Portrayal in film ===
- Isabella is portrayed by Amparo Rivelles in the 1951 Spanish film, Dawn of America.
- Isabella is portrayed by Maribel Martín in the 1976 Spanish film, La espada negra.
- Isabella is portrayed by Sigourney Weaver in the 1992 film, 1492: Conquest of Paradise.
- Isabella is portrayed by Rachel Ward in the 1992 film, Christopher Columbus: The Discovery .
- Isabella is portrayed by June Whitfield in the 1992 film, Carry On Columbus.
- Isabella is portrayed by Rachel Weisz in the 2006 film, The Fountain.
- The award-winning Spanish television series, Isabel, covers the life of Isabella from 1472 until her death in 1504, with Isabella played by Michelle Jenner.

=== Portrayal in video games ===
- In the Sid Meier's Civilization series, Isabella is a playable leader.

== Commemoration ==
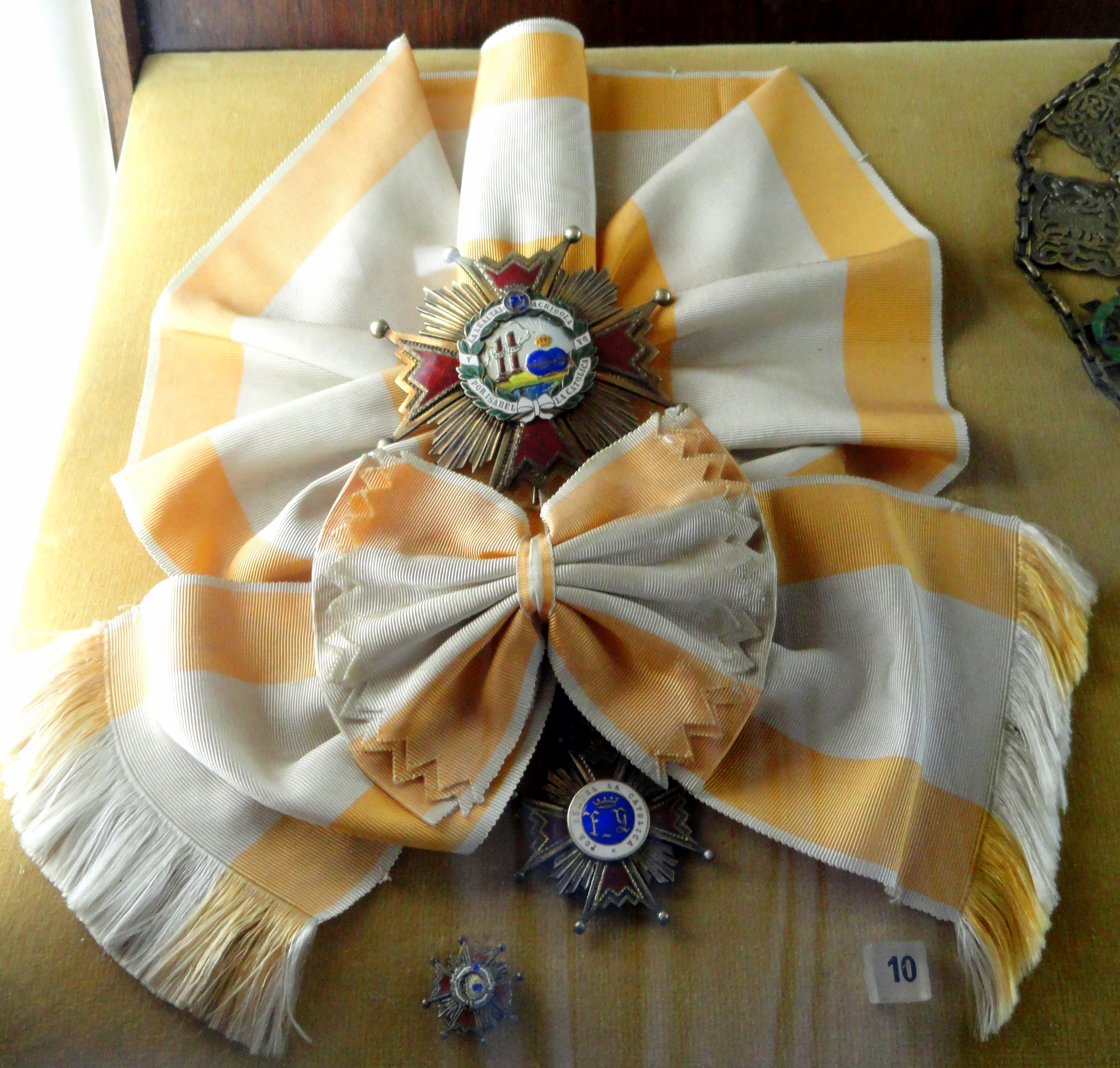
Grand Cross of the Order of Isabella the Catholic

The Spanish crown created the Order of Isabella the Catholic in 1815 in honor of the queen.

In 1893, Isabella was the first woman to be featured on United States postage stamps, namely on three stamps of the Columbian Issue, also in celebration of Columbus. She appears in the 'Columbus soliciting aid of Isabella', 5-cent issue, and on the Spanish court scene replicated on the 15-cent Columbian, and on the $4 issue, in full portrait, side by side with Columbus.

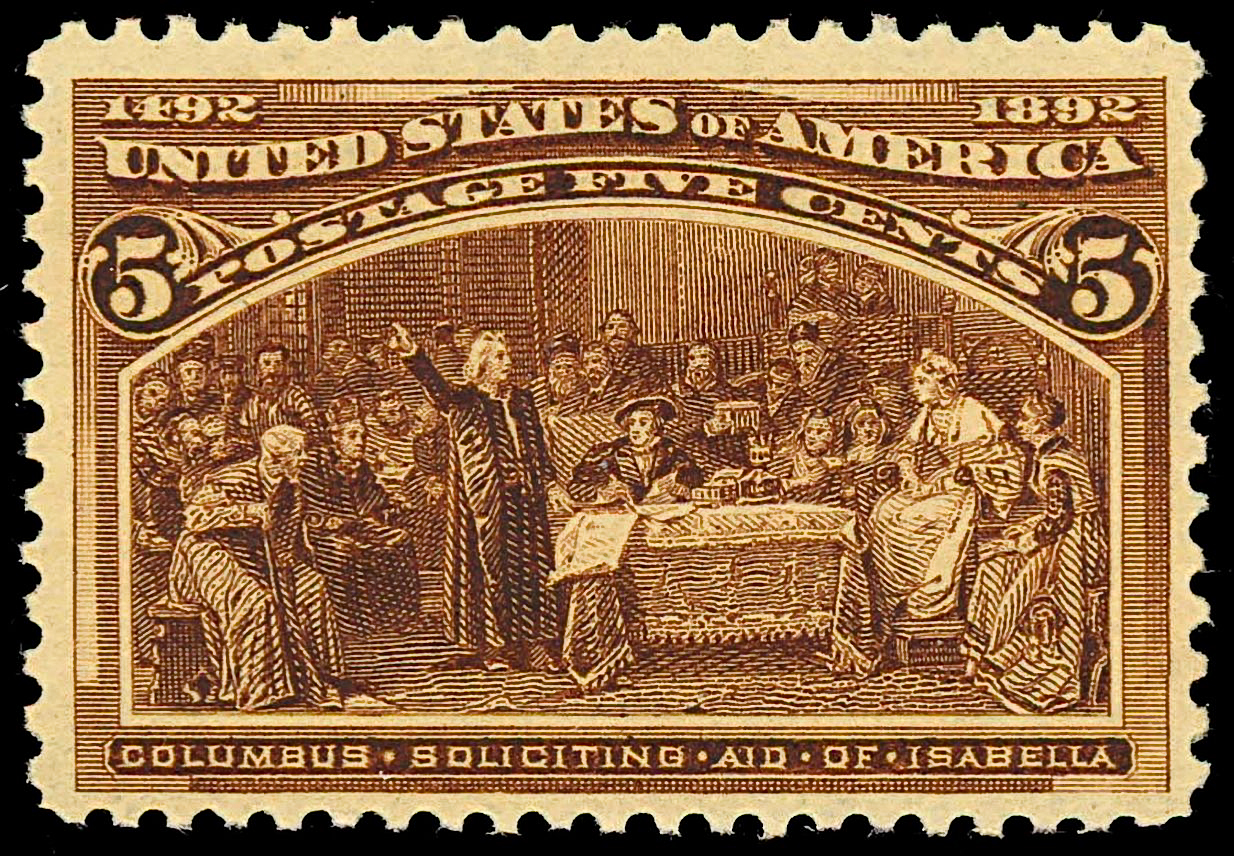
5-cent US postage stamp: Columbus soliciting aid of Isabella

The $4 stamp is the only denomination of its kind issued and is valued by collectors for its rarity (30,000 printed) and appearance, described as carmine with some copies showing a crimson hue. Mint specimens have sold for over $20,000.

Isabella was also the first-named woman to appear on a United States coin, the 1893 commemorative Isabella quarter, celebrating the 400th anniversary of Columbus's first voyage.

== See also ==
- List of Spanish monarchs
- Order of succession
- Ferdinand II of Aragon – Husband of Isabella
- Philip V of Spain – Monarch who implemented a semi-Salic law in the country
- Ferdinand VII of Spain – Monarch who repealed Philip's semi-Salic law, with the issuing of the Pragmatic Sanction of 1830
- Isabella II of Spain – The only queen regnant in Spain after Isabella I and Joanna the Mad

== Explanatory notes ==
Isabella I of Castile House of Trastámara Born: 22 April 1451 Died: 26 November 1504
Regnal titles
Preceded by Henry IV	Queen regnant of Castile, León, Toledo, Galicia, Seville, Córdoba, Murcia, Jaén, Algeciras and Gibraltar; 1474–1504 with Ferdinand V (1475–1504)	Succeeded by Joanna I
Preceded by Muhammad XI as Sultan	Queen regnant of Granada; 1492–1504 with Ferdinand V	Succeeded by Joanna I
Spanish royalty
Vacant Title last held by Juana Enríquez	Queen consort of Sicily; 1469–1504	Vacant Title next held by Germaine of Foix
Vacant Title last held by Juana Enríquez	Queen consort of Aragon; 1479–1504	Vacant Title next held by Germaine of Foix
Preceded by Anne of Brittany	Queen consort of Naples; 1504	Vacant Title next held by Germaine of Foix
Spanish nobility
Preceded by Alfonso	Princess of Asturias; 1468–1474	Succeeded by Isabella
Titles in pretence
Preceded by Henry IV	— TITULAR — Queen regnant of the Algarve; 1474–1504	Succeeded by Joanna I
