= Isabel de Josa =

Spanish poet (1490–1564)

Dona Isabel de Josa y Cardona (1490 in Lleida, Catalonia, Spain – 5 March, 1564 in Vercelli, Piedmont, Italy) was a Catalan writer.

Born Isabel d'Orrit as a member of an influential and wealthy Barcelonian family, she married Guillem Ramon de Josa. She was a humanist, Latinist, philosopher, and specialist on the theology of Dun Scotus. Along with other women from wealthy and influential Barcelona families, she belonged to an exclusively female organization called “las Iñigas,” which was composed of devotees of Ignatius Loyola, founder of the Jesuit order. She helped Ignatius during his studies, and corresponded with him for a number of years. Isabel de Josa was widowed in 1539, after which she travelled to Rome.

She wrote a treatise entitled Tristis Isabella, which is now lost.
