= Timeline of women's education =

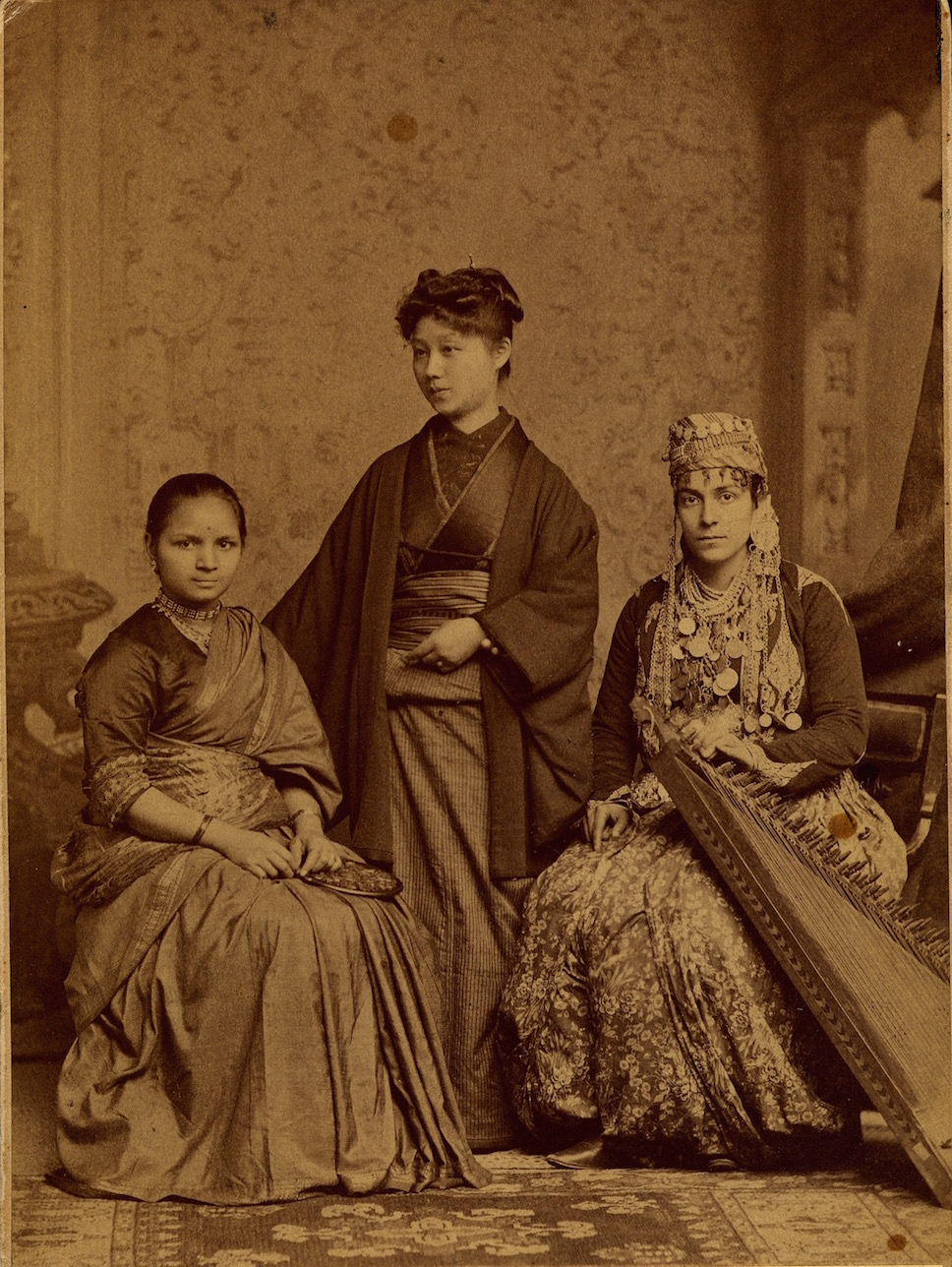
Woman's Medical College of Pennsylvania in 1886: Anandibai Joshee from India (left) with Kei Okami from Japan (center) and Sabat Islambooly from Syria (right). All three completed their medical studies and each of them was the first woman from their respective countries to obtain a degree in Western medicine.

This Timeline of women's education is an overview of the history of education for women worldwide. It includes key individuals, institutions, law reforms, and events that have contributed to the development and expansion of educational opportunities for women.

The timeline highlights early instances of women's education, such as the establishment of girls' schools and women's colleges, as well as legal reforms like compulsory education laws that have had a significant impact on women's access to education.

The 18th and 19th centuries saw significant growth in the establishment of girls' schools and women's colleges, particularly in Europe and North America. Legal reforms began to play a crucial role in shaping women's education, with laws being passed in many countries to make education accessible and compulsory for girls.

The 20th century marked a period of rapid advancement in women's education. Coeducation became more widespread, and women began to enter fields of study that were previously reserved for men. Legislative measures, such as Title IX in the United States, were enacted to ensure equality in educational opportunities.

The timeline also reflects social movements and cultural shifts that have affected women's education, such as the women's suffrage movement, which contributed to the broader fight for women's rights, including education.

Various international organizations and initiatives have been instrumental in promoting women's education in developing countries, recognizing the role of education in empowering women and promoting social and economic development.

This timeline illustrates how women's education has evolved and reflects broader societal changes in gender roles and equality.

== BCE ==
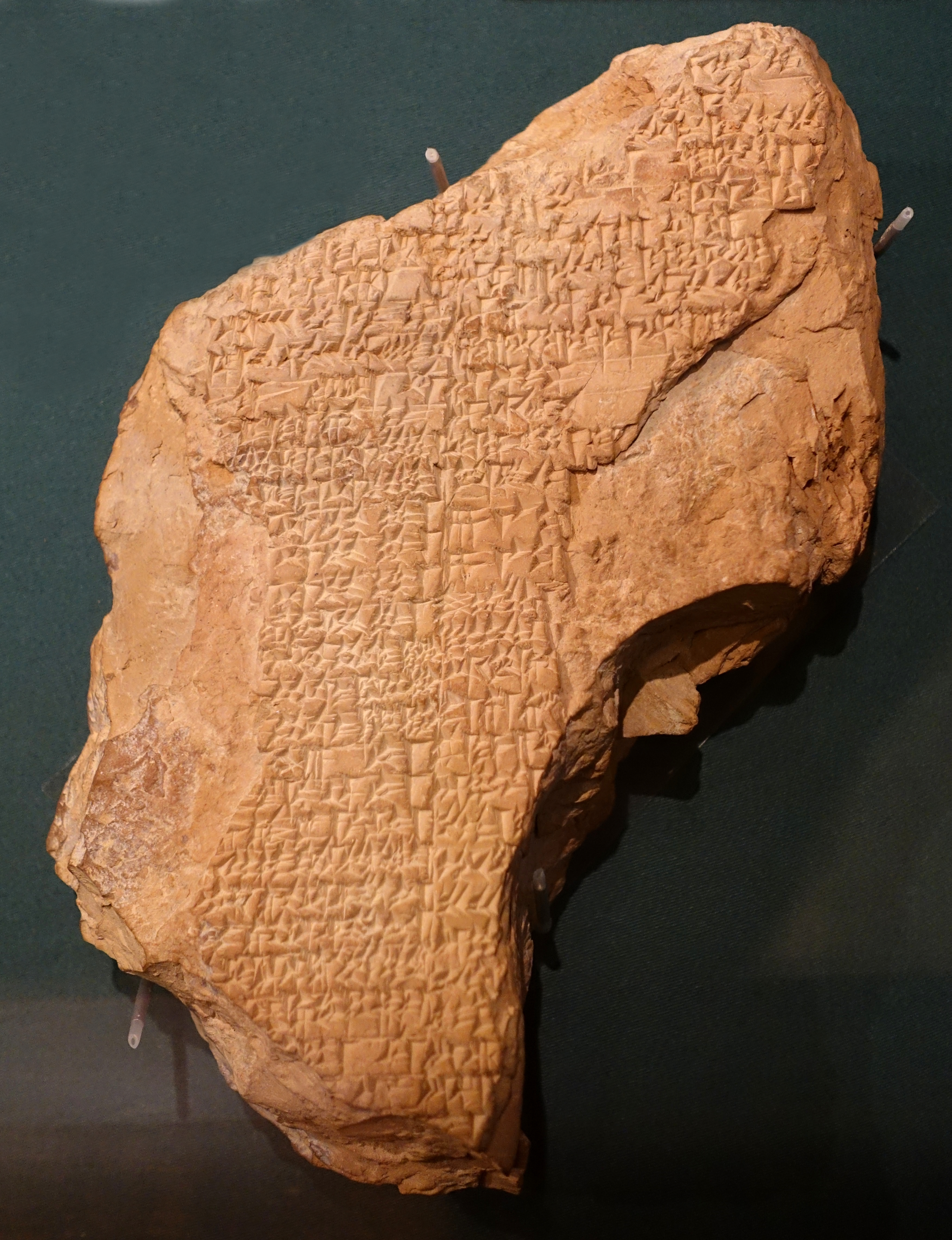
Sumerian clay tablet with the cuneiform inscription of Inanna and Ebih by Enheduanna

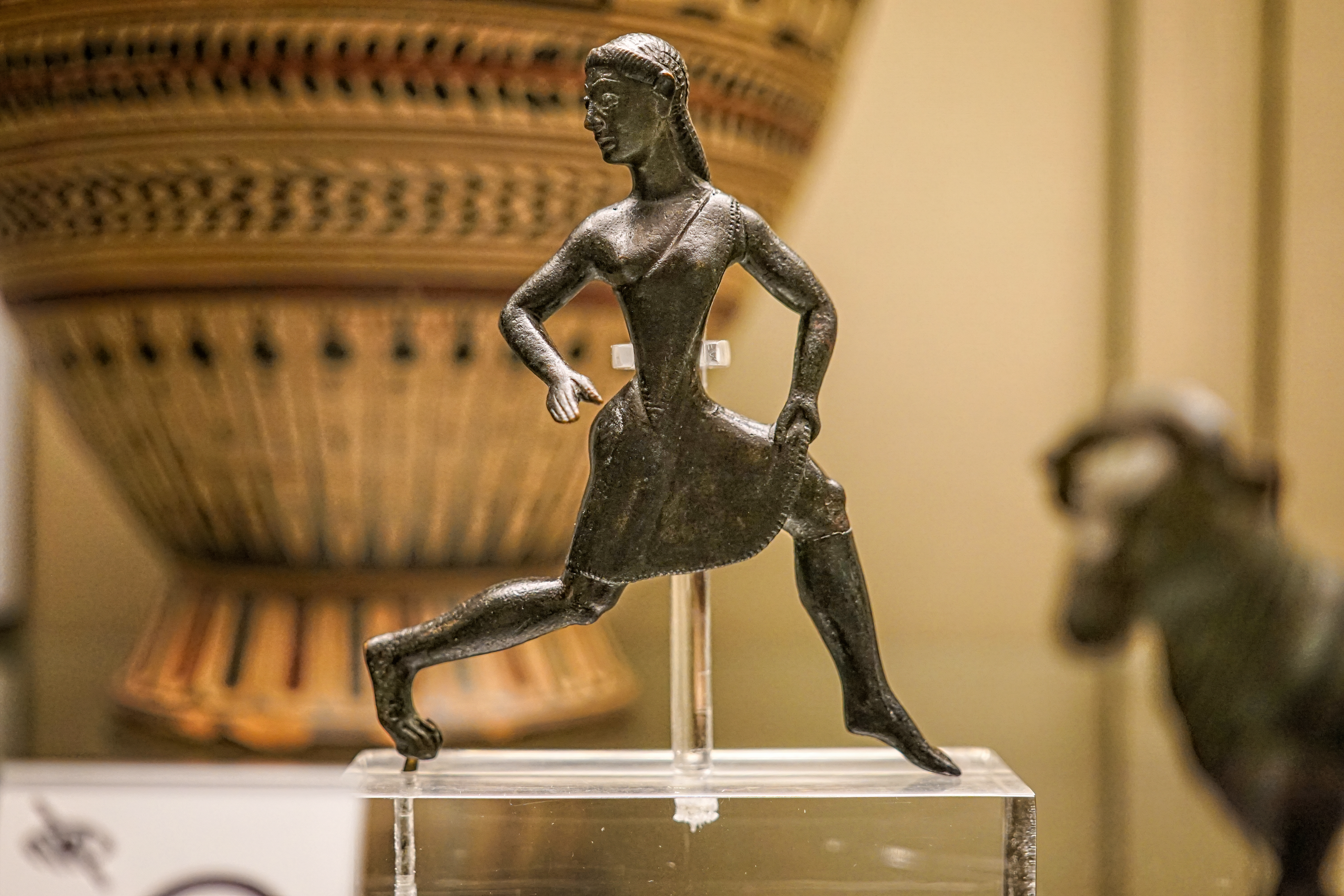
Spartan bronze figure of a running girl, wearing a single-shouldered chiton (British Museum).

Year	Location	Milestone	Ref.
c. 2500	Ancient Egypt	Peseshet, known as the "Overseer of Female Physicians"	
c. 2285–2250	Ancient Mesopotamia	Enheduanna appointed as high priestess and becomes one of the earliest known authors.	
c. 2000	Ancient Egypt	Evidence of women being educated as scribes.	
c. 800–500	Ancient India	Gargi Vachaknavi participates in philosophical debates in the royal court.	
c. 800–500	Ancient India	Maitreyi, a scholar, is involved in philosophical discussions in the Upanishads.	
c. 600	Ancient Greece	Spartan women receive physical education, which was rare in Greece.	
c. 600	Ancient Greece	Theano actively engages in philosophical studies and writings.	
550–300	Ancient Persia	Achaemenid period records indicate that royal women were educated and some took part in administrative roles.	
c. 195–c. 115	Ancient Rome	Cornelia Africana, mother of the Gracchi brothers, educates her children and emphasizes learning.	
c. 100	Ancient Rome	Roman women, including the poet Sulpicia, engage in literary pursuits.	

== 1–1200 CE ==
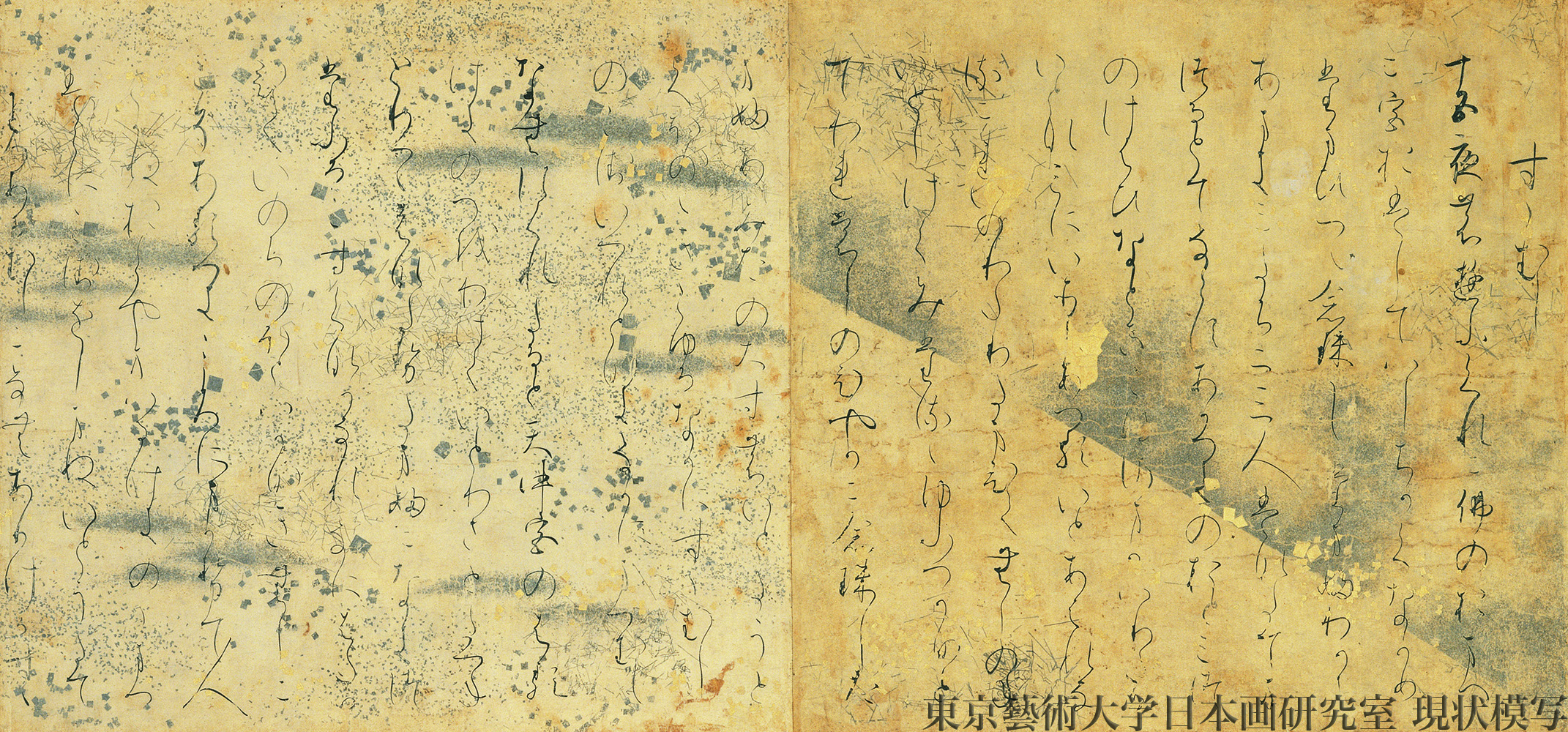
Pages from the illuminated scroll of the 'Tale of Genji' Late Heian period, 12th century, Japan. Originally written by Murasaki Shikibu in the 11th century.

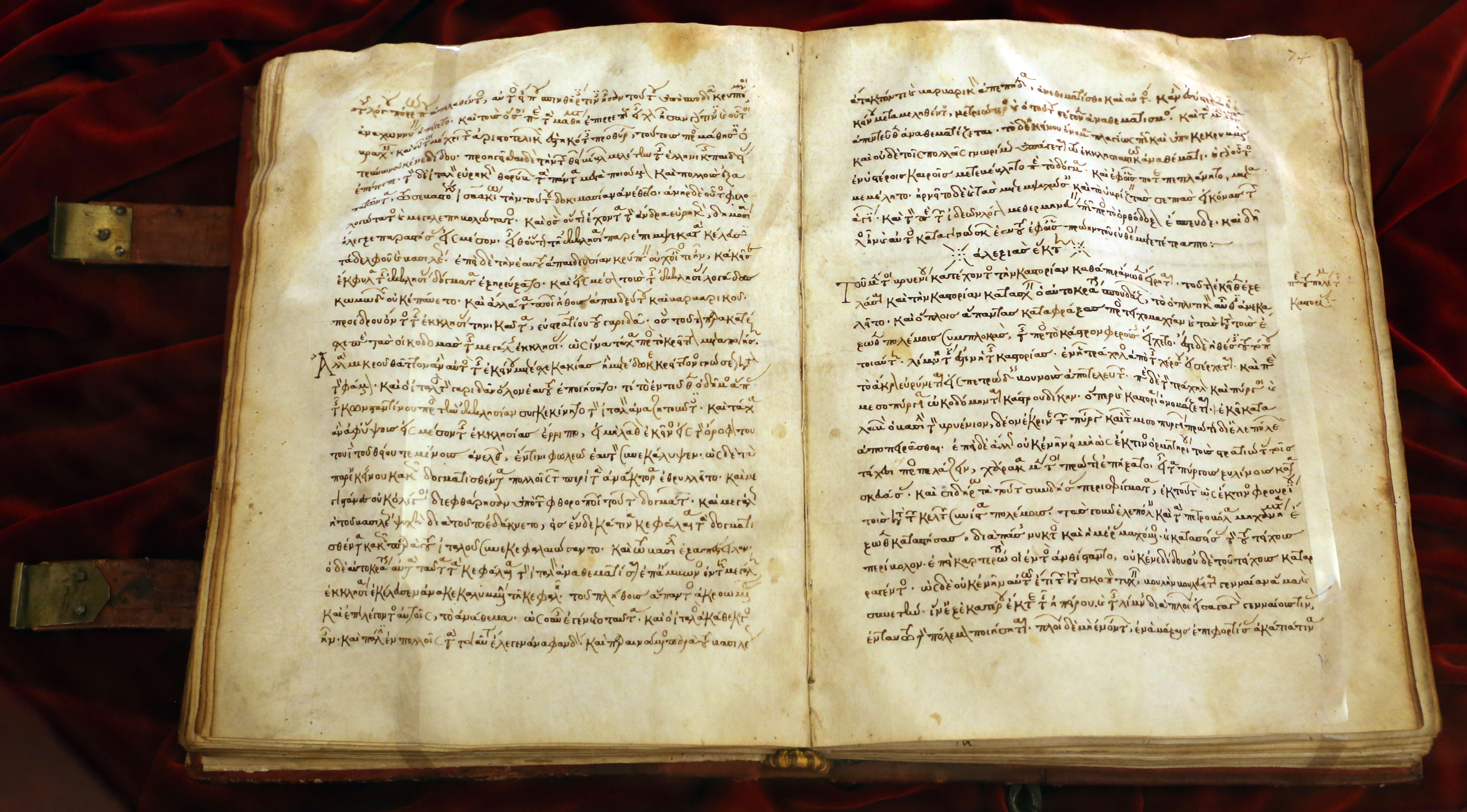
12th-century manuscript of the Alexiad by Anna Komnene in Biblioteca Medicea Laurenziana, Florence

Year	Location	Milestone	Ref.
c. 100 CE	Ancient China	Ban Zhao writes "Lessons for Women," an influential text on women's education.	
664 CE	England	Hilda of Whitby oversees Whitby Abbey, a center of learning.	
700-1200 CE	Islamic Golden Age (countries)	A sponsorship system allows many women to study Hadith, Islamic law, and more.	
705 CE	England	Wimborne Minster, an Anglo-Saxon double monastery, provides education for women.	
c. 750 CE	Germany	Leoba is appointed abbess of the monastery of Tauberbischofsheim, contributing to education.	
859 CE	Morocco	Fatima al-Fihri founds the future University of Al Quaraouiyine (founded as a mosque, it was made in to a university in 1963).	
c. 1000 CE	Ancient Japan	Women contribute to literature, such as Murasaki Shikibu, author of "The Tale of Genji."	
c. 1140 CE	Byzantine Empire	Anna Komnene is educated in Greek literature, history, philosophy, theology, mathematics, and medicine. She contributes to literary works and writes the Alexiad.	
1185 CE	Alsace	Herrad of Landsberg compiles "Hortus Deliciarum," an educational work for women.	

== 13th to 16th centuries ==
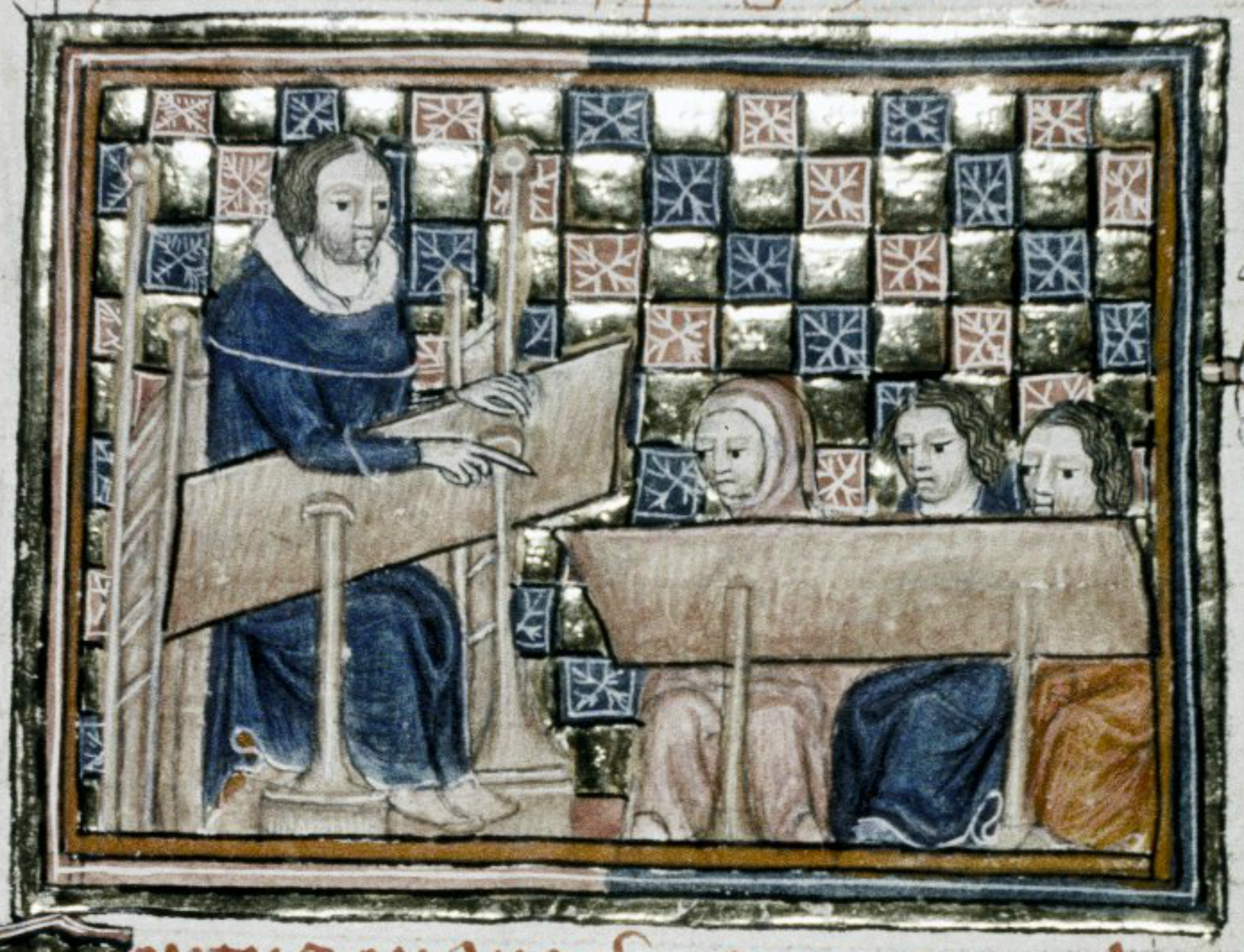
14th-century illustration of William of Nottingham II lecturing at Oxford or Cambridge; one of his students is a woman wearing a cowl.

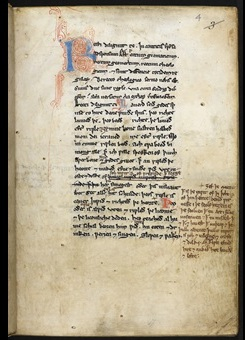
Ancrene Wisse; leaf from the Book of Hours

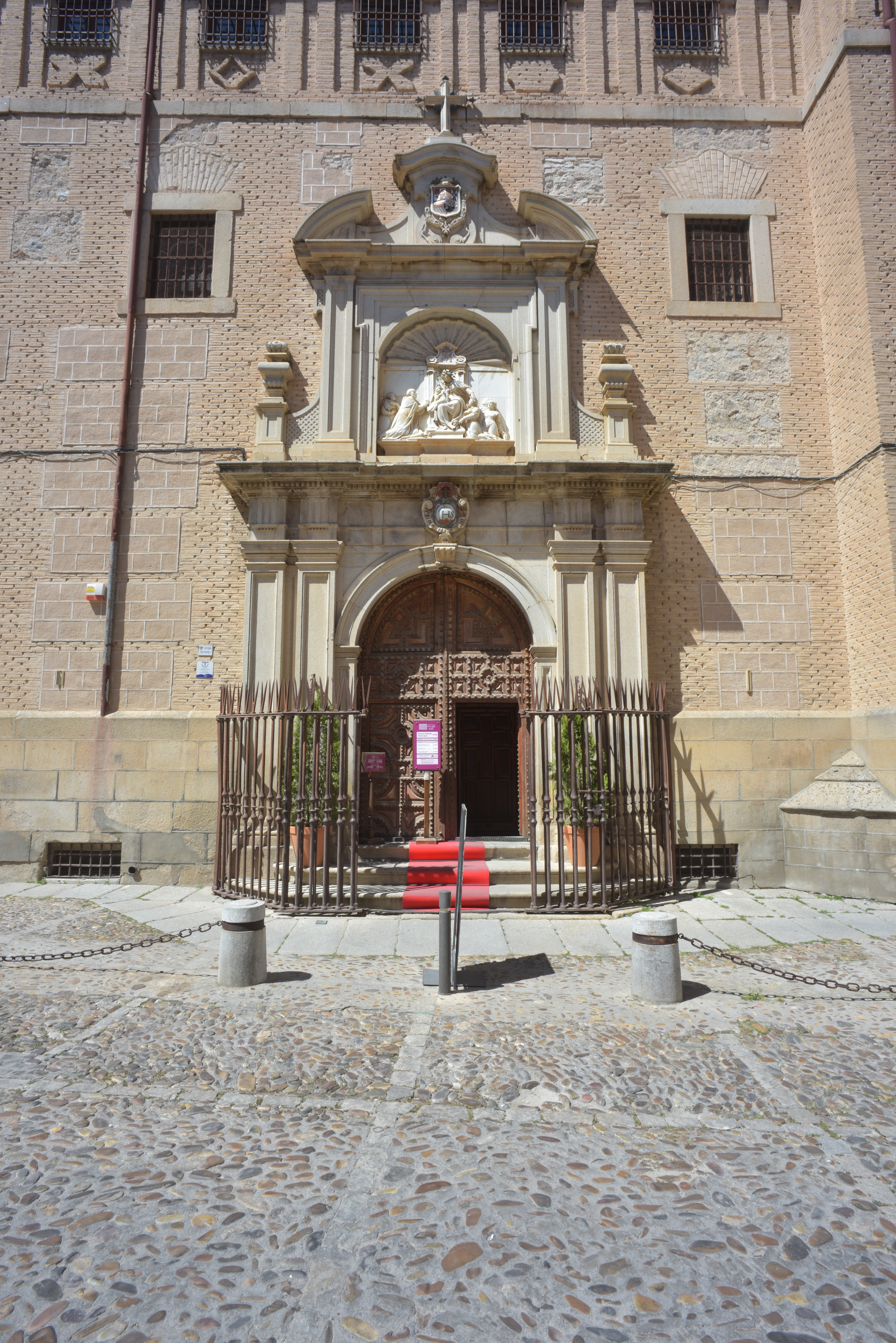
Real Colegio de Doncellas Nobles, a girls' school founded in Toledo, Spain, in 1551.

Year	Location	Milestone	Ref.
Early to mid-13th century	Northern Europe	Beguine communities begin to flourish, providing informal religious education for women.	
c. 1225	England	"Ancrene Wisse," a manual for anchoresses, is written, reflecting the religious education available to some women.	
1237	Italy	Bettisia Gozzadini earns a law degree at the University of Bologna.	
1239	Italy	Bettisia Gozzadini teaches law at the University of Bologna. First woman believed to teach at a university (first university established in 1088).	
c. 1250	Germany	Mechthild of Magdeburg, a Beguine, writes "The Flowing Light of the Godhead," a significant piece of Christian mysticism.	
1390 onwards	Italy	Dorotea Bucca holds a chair of medicine and philosophy in the University of Bologna for 40 years.	
	Italy	Novella d'Andrea teaches law at the University of Bologna.	
7 November 1376	Italy	Virdimura of Catania obtains a royal medical license to practice medicine after an examination by the doctors of the royal court.	
fl. 1415	Italy	Constance Calenda may have received a medical degree from the University of Naples Federico II.	
c. 1500	Spain	Luisa de Medrano teaches at the University of Salamanca and writes works of philosophy, now lost.	
c. 1500	Spain	Isabella Losa gets a D.D. (Doctor of Divinity) theology degree.	
c. 1500	Spain	Francisca de Lebrija teaches rhetoric at the University of Alcalá.	
c. 1500	Spain	Beatriz Galindo excels in Latin, studies at one of the institutions dependent on the University of Salamanca, writes commentary on Aristotle and becomes a teacher of the queen.	
1551	Spain	Real Colegio de Doncellas Nobles is founded.	
1571	Sweden	The Swedish Church Ordinance 1571 stipulates that both boys and girls should be given basic schooling such as reading, writing, counting and basic commercial skills.	

== 17th century ==
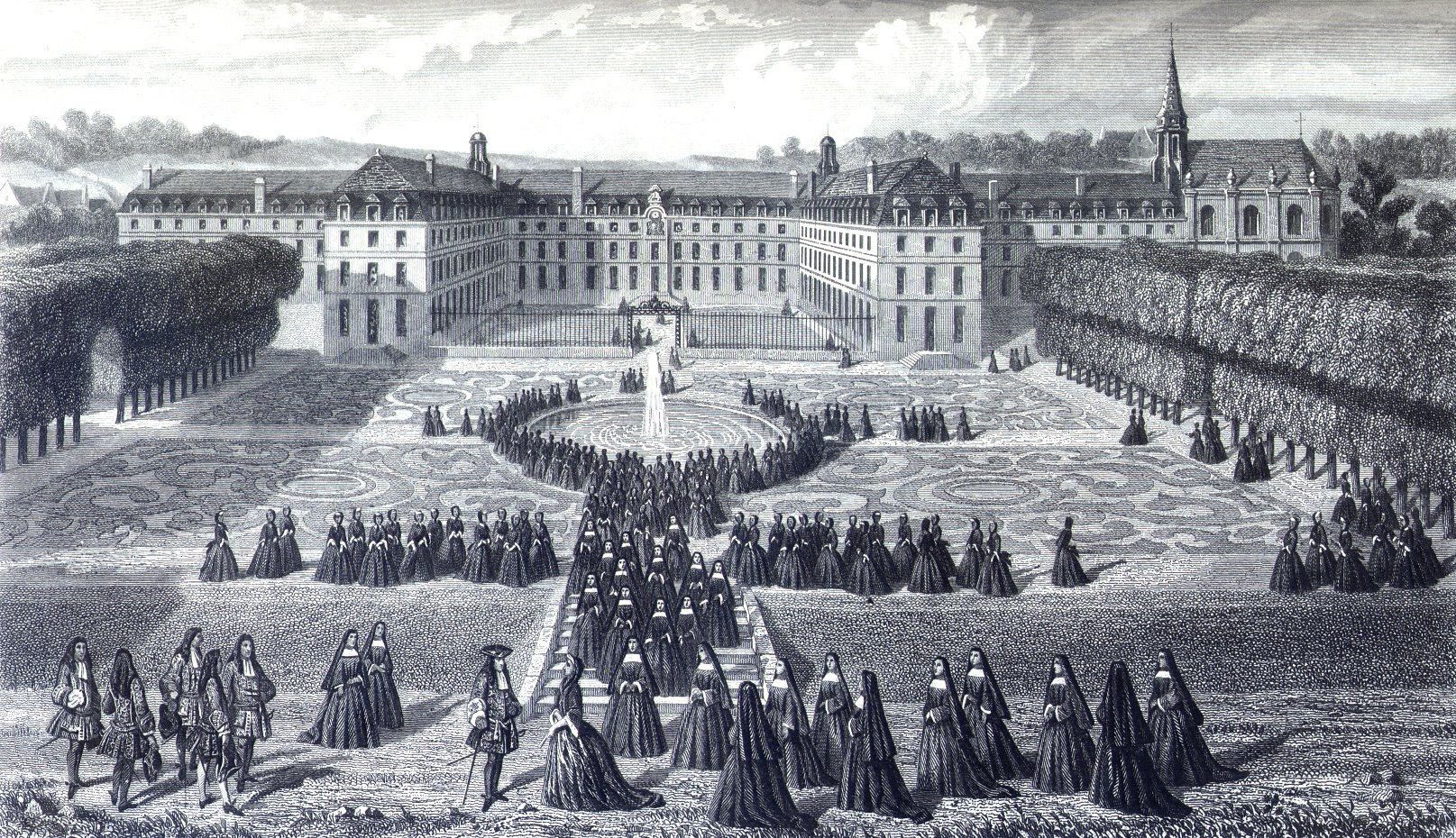
Representation of the official visit of Louis XIV and Madame de Maintenon at the newly founded Maison royale de Saint-Louis of Saint Cyr, 1690 ca.

Year	Location	Milestone	Ref.
1608	Spain	Juliana Morell "defended theses" in 1606 or 1607 in Lyon or maybe Avignon, although claims that she received a doctorate in canon law in 1608 have been discredited. According to Lope de Vega, she taught "all the sciences from professorial chairs".	
1636	Netherlands	German-born Dutch Anna Maria van Schurman, proficient in 14 languages, studies as the first female student at Utrecht University, Netherlands, but without obtaining a degree.	
1639	Acadia	The French colony of Acadia, which at the time included part of Maine, had an Ursuline boarding school by 1639 that was geared toward the education of young girls. The school was founded in Quebec City and is still in operation today.	
1644	Sweden	First female college students, Ursula Agricola and Maria Jonae Palmgren.	
1674	New Spain	In this year, Bishop Calderon of Santiago wrote to Queen Mother Maria Anna concerning the Spanish efforts at colonizing Florida. In his letter he included some comments about the state of education and stated, "The children, both male and female, go to church on work days, to a religious school where they are taught by a teacher whom they call Athequi of the church; [a person] whom the priests have for this service." This description indicates that the colonies of New Spain had facilities for female education at least by the 1600s. It is not clear how far back this goes; the 1512 laws of Burgos, from over a hundred years earlier, did not specify whether instruction should be for males only: it uses the word hijos, which means sons, but can include daughters if they are mixed in with the boys.	
1678	Italy	Elena Cornaro Piscopia, an Italian woman, earns a Ph.D. (Doctor of Philosophy) degree from the University of Padua in Italy and is said to have taught mathematics at the University of Padua.	
1684	France	The Maison royale de Saint-Louis is founded.	
1685	Italy	Rosa Venerini opens the first free school for girls in Italy, in the town of Viterbe.	
1698	Germany	The first secular secondary education girls' school in Germany is established by the Pietist August Hermann Francke in Halle, and becomes a pioneer institution for a number of girls' schools in Germany during the 18th century.	

== 18th century ==
Year	Location	Milestone	Ref.
1727	United States	Founded in 1727 by the Sisters of the Order of Saint Ursula, Ursuline Academy, New Orleans, is both the oldest continuously operating school for girls and the oldest Catholic school in the United States. The Ursuline Sisters founded this school out of the conviction that the education of women was essential to the development of a civilized, spiritual and just society, and has influenced culture and learning in New Orleans by providing an education for its women.	
1732	Italy	Laura Bassi, an Italian woman, earns a Ph.D. degree at the University of Bologna in Italy, and teaches physics at the same university. She was the first woman to have a doctorate in science. Working at the University of Bologna, she was also the first salaried woman teacher in a university, and at one time she was the highest paid employee. She was also the first woman member of any scientific establishment, when she was elected to the Academy of Sciences of the Institute of Bologna in 1732.	
1742	United States	At only 16 years of age, Countess Benigna von Zinzendorf establishes the first all-girls boarding school in America, sponsored by her father Count Nicholas von Zinzendorf. Originally known as the Bethlehem Female Seminary upon its 1742 founding, it changed its name to Moravian Seminary and College for Women by 1913. 1863 proved the Germantown, Pennsylvania-based school's most landmark year, however, when the state recognized it as a college and granted it permission to award bachelor's degrees. As a result, most tend to accept Moravian as the oldest—though not continuously operational because of its current co-ed status—specifically female institute of higher learning in the United States.	
1751	Italy	Cristina Roccati becomes the third woman to receive a Ph.D. degree in Italy.	
1764	Russia	Foundation of the Smolny Institute of Noble Maidens, the first women's educational institution in Russia, that laid the foundation for women's education in the country. It was Europe's first public educational institution for girls.	
1765	Russia	Foundation of the Novodevichii Institute.	
1783	United States	Washington College in Chestertown, Maryland, appoints the first women instructors at any American college or university, Elizabeth Callister Peale and Sarah Callister, members of the famous Peale family of artists. They teach painting and drawing.	
1786	Russia	Catherine the Great opens free public primary and high school education to girls.	
1787	Germany	Dorothea von Rodde-Schlözer becomes the first German woman to earn a Ph.D. from the University of Göttingen.	
1787	Sweden	Societetsskolan is founded.	
1787	Denmark	J. Cl. Todes Døtreskole is founded.	
1788	Sweden	Aurora Liljenroth becomes the first female college graduate.	
1791	Denmark	One of the first schools of any note for girls is established as Døtreskolen af 1791.	

== 19th century ==
=== 1800–1849 ===
Year	Location	Milestone	Ref.
1803	United States	Bradford Academy in Bradford, Massachusetts, was the first higher educational institution to admit women in Massachusetts. It was founded as a co-educational institution, but became exclusively for women in 1836.	
1818	India	Western Christian missionaries open the first western-style charter schools in India open to girls.	
1822	Serbia	Girls are allowed to attend elementary schools with boys up until the fourth grade.	
1823	Argentina	The Sociedad de Beneficencia de Buenos Aires is charged by the government to establish and control (private) elementary schools for girls, retaining control of the schools for girls until 1876.	
1826	United States	The first American public high schools for girls are opened in New York and Boston.	
1827	Brazil	The first elementary schools for girls are opened and the profession of school teacher is established.	
1829	United States	The first public examination of an American girl in geometry is held.	
1830s	Egypt	Christian missionaries are allowed to open elementary schools for girls.	
1831	United States	As a private institution in 1831, Mississippi College becomes the first coeducational college in the United States to grant a degree to a woman. In December 1831 it grants degrees to two women, Alice Robinson and Catherine Hall.	
1834	Greece	Primary education becomes compulsory for both boys and girls, in parallel with the foundation of the first private secondary educational schools for girls, such as the Arsakeio.	
1834	Iran	The Fiske Seminary, first school for girls, is opened in Urmia.	
1836	United States	Bradford Academy in Bradford, Massachusetts, due to declining enrollment, becomes a single-sexed institution for the education of women exclusively.	
1837	United States	Mount Holyoke College in South Hadley, Massachusetts, opens as Mount Holyoke Seminary. Founded by Mary Lyons, it becomes one of the first institutions of higher learning for women in the United States.	
1839	United States	Established in 1836, Georgia Female College in Macon, Georgia, opens its doors to students on January 7, 1839. Now known as Wesleyan College, it is the first college in the world chartered specifically to grant bachelor's degrees to women.	
1840s	Denmark	In the 1840s, schools for girls spread outside the capital and a net of secondary education girl schools is established in Denmark.	
1841	Bulgaria	The first secular girls school make education and the profession of teacher available for women.	
1841	United Kingdom	Whitelands College established in London as the first teacher training college for women in England (opened January 1842)	
1842	Sweden	Compulsory elementary school for both sexes is introduced.	
1842	Singapore	Maria Dyer founds the oldest girls' school in Singapore. Initially known as the "Chinese Girls' School", it is now called St. Margaret's Secondary School).	
1843	Ghana	Catherine Mulgrave arrives on the Gold Coast from Jamaica and subsequently establishes three boarding schools for girls at Osu (1843), Abokobi (1855) and Odumase (1859) between 1843 and 1891.	
1844	Finland	The Svenska fruntimmersskolan i Åbo and its sister school Svenska fruntimmersskolan i Helsingfors are founded in Helsinki.	
1846	Denmark	The first college for women in Denmark, the teachers seminary Den højere Dannelsesanstalt for Damer, is opened in 1846.	
1847	Costa Rica	The first high school for girls, and the profession of teacher, are opened to women.	
1847	Ghana	Rosina Widmann opens a vocational school for girls in January 1847, with the first classes in needlework for 12 girls at her home in Akropong in the Gold Coast colony.	
1848	India	The elementary school for girls, Bhide Wada, in Pune is opened by Savitribai Phule and her husband.	
1849	United States	Elizabeth Blackwell, born in England, becomes the first woman to earn a medical degree from an American college, Geneva Medical College in New York.	
1849	United Kingdom	Bedford College opens in London as the first higher education college for women in the United Kingdom. It later merges with Royal Holloway College, to form Royal Holloway, University of London.	
1849	India	Secondary education for girls is made available with the foundation of the Bethune College.	

=== 1850–1874 ===
Year	Location	Milestone	Ref.
1850	United States	Lucy Stanton earns a literary degree from Oberlin College, becoming the first Black woman in the United States to receive a college degree.	
1850	France	Elementary education is established for both sexes, but girls are only allowed to be tutored by teachers from the church.	
1850	United Kingdom	North London Collegiate School, the first school in England to offer girls the same educational opportunities as boys, opens.	
1850	Haiti	First permanent school for girls, the Institution Mont-Carmel, is founded by Marie-Rose Léodille Delaunay.	
1851	Ghana	Regina Hesse moves into the household of her mentor, Catherine Mulgrave and her spouse, Johannes Zimmermann to understudy the methods of pedagogy. She later became the de facto principal of Mulgrave's girls' school at Christiansborg.	
1852	Nicaragua	Josefa Vega is granted dispensation to attend lectures at university, after which women are given the right to apply for permission to attend lectures at university (though not to an actual full university education).	
1853	Egypt	The first Egyptian school for females is opened by Copts.	
1853	Serbia	The first secondary educational school for females is inaugurated (public schools for girls having opened in 1845–46).	
1853	Sweden	The profession of teacher at public primary and elementary schools is opened to both sexes.	
1854	Chile	The first public elementary school for girls is opened.	
1855	United States	University of Iowa becomes the first coeducational public or state university in the United States.	
1857	Netherlands	Elementary education is made compulsory for both girls and boys.	
1857	Spain	Elementary education is made compulsory for both girls and boys.	
1858	United States	Mary Fellows becomes the first woman west of the Mississippi River to receive a baccalaureate degree.	
1858	Ottoman Empire	The first state school for girls is opened; several other schools for girls are opened during the following decades.	
1858	Russia	Gymnasium high schools are opened for girls.	
1859	Denmark	The post of teacher at public schools is opened to women.	
1859	Ghana	Rose Ann Miller starts an all-girls' boarding school at Aburi under the auspices of the Basel Mission.	
1859	Sweden	The post of college teacher and lower official at public institutions are open to women.	
1860	Norway	Women are allowed to teach in the rural elementary school system (in the city schools in 1869).	
1861	Sweden	The first public institution of higher academic learning for women, the Royal Seminary, is opened.	
1862	United States	Mary Jane Patterson becomes the first African-American woman to earn a BA in 1862. She earned her degree from Oberlin College.	
1862	Canada	Mount Allison University opens to women.	
1863	Serbia	Inauguration of the Women's High School in Belgrade, first high school open to women in Serbia (and the entire Balkans).	
1863	United States	Mary Corinna Putnam Jacobi graduates from the New York College of Pharmacy in 1863, making her the first woman to graduate from a United States school of pharmacy.	
1864	Belgium	The first official secondary education school opens to girls in Belgium.	
1864	Haiti	Elementary schools for girls are founded.	
1864	United States	Rebecca Lee Crumpler becomes the first African-American woman to graduate from a U.S. college with a medical degree, and the first and only Black woman to obtain the Doctress of Medicine degree from Boston University in Boston, Massachusetts.	
1865	Romania	The educational reform grants all Romanians access to education. At least formally, this gave females the right to attend school from elementary education to the university.	
1866	United States	Sarah Jane Woodson Early becomes the first African-American woman to serve as a professor. Xenia, Ohio's Wilberforce University hired her to teach Latin and English in 1866.	
1866	United States	Lucy Hobbs Taylor becomes the first American woman to earn a dental degree (from the Ohio College of Dental Surgery).	
1866	Sweden	The Girls' School Committee of 1866 is established.	
1867	Switzerland	University of Zurich formally opens to women, though they had already been allowed to attend lectures for a few years.	
1868	Croatia	The first high school opens to girls.	
1869	United States	Fanny Jackson Coppin is named principal of the Institute for Colored Youth in Philadelphia, becoming the first Black woman to head an institution for higher learning in the United States.	
1869	Austria-Hungary	The profession of public school teacher is open to women.	
1869	Costa Rica	Elementary education is made compulsory for both girls and boys.	
1869	Ottoman Empire	Compulsory elementary education is formally introduced for both boys and girls.	
1869	Russia	University courses for women are opened, which opens the profession of teacher, law assistant and similar lower academic professions for women (in 1876, the courses are no longer allowed to give exams, and in 1883, all outside of the capital are closed).	
1869	United Kingdom	In Edinburgh, the Watt Institution and School of Arts, a predecessor of Heriot-Watt University, admits women. Mary Burton persuades the Watt Institution and School of Arts to open its doors to women students in 1869 and goes on to become the first woman on the school's board of directors and a life governor of Heriot-Watt College.	
1869	United Kingdom	The Edinburgh Seven are the first group of matriculated undergraduate female students at any British university. They began studying medicine at the University of Edinburgh in 1869 and although they were unsuccessful in their struggle to graduate and qualify as doctors, the campaign they fought gained national attention and won them many supporters, including Charles Darwin. It put the rights of women to a university education on the national political agenda which eventually resulted in legislation to ensure that women could study at university in 1877.	
1869	United Kingdom	Girton College opens as the first residential college for women in the United Kingdom.	
1870	United States	The first woman is admitted to Cornell University.	
1870	United States	The Board of Regents of the University of California rules that women should be admitted on an equal basis with men. With the completion of North and South Halls in 1873, the university relocated to its Berkeley location with 167 male and 222 female students.	
1870	United States	Ada Kepley becomes the first American woman to earn a law degree, from Northwestern University Pritzker School of Law.	
1870	United States	Ellen Swallow Richards becomes the first American woman to earn a degree in chemistry, which she earned from Vassar College in 1870.	
1870	Finland	Women are allowed to study at the universities by dispensation (dispensation requirement dropped in 1901).	
1870	Spain	The Asociación para la Enseñanza de la Mujer is founded, promoting education for women; it establishes secondary schools and training colleges all over Spain, making secondary and higher education open to females for the first time.	
1870	Sweden	Universities open to women (on the same terms as men in 1873).	
1871	United States	Frances Willard becomes the first women's college president in the United States, as president of Evanston College for Ladies in Illinois.	
1871	United States	Harriette Cooke becomes the first woman college professor in the United States, appointed full professor with a salary equal to that of her male peers.	
1871	Ottoman Empire	The American College for Girls, initially known as The Home School, is opened in Constantinople to educate women as professional teachers for girls' schools; the profession of teacher becomes accessible for women and education accessible to girls.	
1871	Netherlands	Aletta Jacobs becomes the first woman to be accepted at the University of Groningen.	
1871	India	The first training school for women teachers is opened.	
1871	Japan	Women are allowed to study in the USA (though not yet in Japan itself).	
1871	New Zealand	Universities open to women.	
1872	Sweden	First female university student: Betty Pettersson.	
1872	Japan	Compulsory elementary education for both girls and boys.	
1872	Ottoman Empire	The first government primary school is opened for both genders. The Women's Teacher's Training School opens in Istanbul.	
1872	Russia	Establishment of the Guerrier Courses.	
1872	Spain	María Elena Maseras is allowed to enlist as a university student with special dispensation. After being formally admitted to a class in 1875, she was finally allowed to graduate in 1882, creating a precedent for women to enroll at universities from this point on.	
1873	United States	Linda Richards becomes the first American woman to earn a degree in nursing.	
1873	Egypt	The first public Egyptian primary school for girls is opened. Two years later, there are 32 primary schools for females in Egypt, three also offering secondary education.	
1873	United Kingdom	Sarah Woodhead becomes the first woman to pass a Tripos examination at the University of Cambridge.	
1874	United States	The first woman to graduate from the University of California, Rosa L. Scrivner, obtains a Ph.B. (Bachelor of Philosophy) in Agriculture.	
1874	Iran	The first school for girls is founded by American missionaries (only non-Muslims attend until 1891).	
1874	Japan	The profession of public school teacher is opened to women.	
1874	Netherlands	Aletta Jacobs becomes the first woman allowed to study medicine.	
1874	United Kingdom	London School of Medicine for Women is founded, becoming the first medical school in Britain to train women.	
1874	Germany	Russian mathematician Sofya Kovalevskaya became the first woman to earn a doctorate (in the modern sense) in mathematics.	
1874	Canada	Grace Annie Lockhart becomes the first woman in the British Empire to receive a bachelor's degree, graduating from Mount Allison University in Canada.	

=== 1875–1899 ===
Year	Location	Milestone	Ref.
1875	Switzerland	Stefania Wolicka, a Polish woman, becomes the first woman to earn a PhD from the University of Zurich.	
1875	Denmark	Women are permitted to take the school leaving examination (studentereksamen) and study at the University of Copenhagen with certain restrictions.	
1875	India	The first women are admitted to college courses, although with special permission (at Madras Medical College).	
1876	Argentina	Girls are included in the national school system by the transference of control of private girls schools from the charitable Beneficent Society to the provincial government.	
1876	United Kingdom	Medical examining bodies are given the right to certify women.	
1876	India	Women are allowed to attend university exams at the Calcutta University.	
1876	Italy	Universities open to women.	
1876	Netherlands	Universities open to women.	
1876	United Kingdom	University College, Bristol (now the University of Bristol) opens as the first co-educational university college in England.	
1876	United States	Elizabeth Bragg becomes the first female to graduate with an engineering degree in the U.S. (in civil engineering from the University of California, Berkeley).	
1876	United States	Anna Oliver becomes the first woman to graduate from a Methodist seminary, receiving a Bachelor of Divinity from Boston University School of Theology	
1877	United States	Helen Magill White becomes the first American woman to earn a Ph.D. (earned in Greek at Boston University).	
1877	Chile	Universities open to women.	
1877	New Zealand	Kate Edger becomes the first woman to graduate from a university in New Zealand.	
1878	Austria-Hungary	Women are allowed to attend university lectures as guest auditors.	
1878	Bulgaria	Elementary education is introduced for both genders.	
1878	Russia	The Bestuzhev Courses open in Saint Petersburg.	
1878	United States	Mary L. Page becomes the first American woman to earn a degree in architecture (at the University of Illinois Urbana-Champaign).	
1878	United Kingdom	Lady Margaret Hall, the first college at the University of Oxford to admit women, is founded.	
1878	United Kingdom	The University of London receives a supplemental charter allowing it to award degrees to women, the first university in the United Kingdom to open its degrees.	
1879	United Kingdom	Royal Holloway College, a women-only college, is founded by the Victorian entrepreneur Thomas Holloway on the Mount Lee Estate in Egham. It later merged with Bedford College to become Royal Holloway, University of London.	
1879	United States	Mary Eliza Mahoney becomes the first African-American in the U.S. to earn a diploma in nursing (from the School of Nursing at the New England Hospital for Women and Children in Boston).	
1879	Brazil	Universities open to women.	
1879	France	Colleges and secondary education open to women.	
1879	India	The first college open to women: Bethune College (the first female graduate in 1883).	
1880	Australia	Universities open to women.	
1880	Belgium	The University of Brussels is opened to women.	
1880	France	Universities open to women.	
1880	France	Free public secondary education to women.	
1880	France	Public teachers training schools open to women.	
1880	United Kingdom	First four women gain BA degrees at the University of London, the first women in the UK to be awarded degrees.	
1880	United Kingdom	The Victoria University founded, with women allowed under its royal charter to take degrees from the start. However, it is not until 1883 that any of its colleges allow women to enter.	
1881	United Kingdom	Women are allowed to take the Cambridge Mathematical Tripos exams, following Charlotte Scott's unofficial ranking as eighth wrangler.	
1881	United States	American Association of University Women is founded.	
1882	United Kingdom	College Hall opens as a hall of residence for women students in London, primarily for students at University College London and the London School of Medicine for Women, becoming an official University of London student hall in 2010.	
1882	France	Compulsory elementary education for both genders.	
1882	Norway	Women allowed to study at the university.	
1882	Nicaragua	The first public secular education institution for women, Colegio de Señoritas, opens.	
1882	Poland	The Flying University provides academic education for women.	
1882	Serbia	Compulsory education for both genders.	
1882	Belgium	Universities open to women.	
1882	India	Bombay University open to women.	
1882	Romania	Universities open to women.	
1883	Australia	Bella Guerin becomes the first woman to graduate from a university in Australia (from the University of Melbourne).	
1883	Sweden	Ellen Fries, a historian, becomes the first Swedish woman to obtain her Ph.D. (from Uppsala University)	
1883	United States	Susan Hayhurst becomes the first woman to receive a pharmacy degree in the United States (from the University of the Sciences in Philadelphia).	
1883	United Kingdom	Sophie Bryant becomes the first woman in Britain to earn a D.Sc. (Doctor of Science).	
1885	Sierra Leone	Adelaide Casely-Hayford becomes the first African woman to study music at the Stuttgart Conservatory.	
1886	United States	Winifred Edgerton Merrill becomes the first American woman to earn a Ph.D. in mathematics (from Columbia University).	
1886	United States	Anandibai Joshi from India, Kei Okami from Japan, and Sabat Islambouli from Syria become the first women from their respective countries (and in Joshi's case the first Hindu woman) to get a degree in western medicine (from the Woman's Medical College of Pennsylvania).	
1886	France	Women become eligible to join public education boards.	
1886	France	Iulia Hasdeu becomes the first Romanian woman to study at the Sorbonne. She enrolled at age 16 and died two years later while preparing her doctoral thesis.	
1886	Costa Rica	A public academic educational institution open to women.	
1886	Denmark	N. Zahle's School in Copenhagen is founded as a private school to prepare girls to take the school leaving certificate (studentereksamen).	
1886	Korea	The first educational institution for women, Ewha Womans University, is founded.	
1886	Mexico	Universities open to women.	
1887	Albania	The first Albanian language elementary school is opened for girls.	
1889	United States	Maria Louise Baldwin becomes the first African-American female principal in Massachusetts and the Northeast, supervising white faculty and a predominantly white student body at the Agassiz Grammar School in Cambridge.	
1889	United States	Susan La Flesche Picotte becomes the first Native American woman to earn a medical degree (from Woman's Medical College of Pennsylvania).	
1889	Sweden	Women become eligible to join boards of public authority, such as public school boards.	
1889	Sweden	First female professor: Sofya Kovalevskaya.	
1889	Egypt	The first teacher training college for women.	
1889	Argentina	Cecilia Grierson becomes the first woman in Argentina to earn a medical university degree.	
1889	Palestine	The first school open to girls is founded by missionaries.	
1889	United Kingdom	Scottish universities are opened to women under the Universities (Scotland) Act 1889.	
1889	El Salvador	Antonia Navarro Huezo becomes the first Salvadoran woman to earn a topographic engineering doctorate.	
1890	United States	Ida Gray becomes the first African-American woman to earn a Doctor of Dental Surgery degree {from the University of Michigan].	
1890	Finland	Signe Hornborg graduates as an architect from the Helsinki University of Technology in Finland, becoming the first ever formally qualified female architect in the world.	
1890	Bohemia	The first secondary education school opens for girls in Prague.	
1890	Greece	Universities open to women.	
1891	Albania	The first school of higher education for women is opened. It was founded by siblings Sevasti and Gjerasim Qiriazi.	
1891	Germany	Women are allowed to attend university lectures, making it possible for individual professors to accept female students if they wish.	
1891	Greece	Sevasti Kallisperi graduates from The Sorbonne in Paris with a doctorate degree, making her the first Greek woman to earn a university degree.	
1891	Portugal	The first medical university degree is granted to a woman.	
1891	Switzerland	Secondary schools open to women.	
1891	Ecuador	Juana Miranda, an obstetrician, becomes the Republic's first female university professor; she teaches at the Central University of Ecuador's medical school.	
1892	United States	Laura Eisenhuth becomes the first woman elected to state office as Superintendent of Public Instruction.	
1893	Ottoman Empire	Women are permitted to attend medical lectures at Istanbul University.	
1893	France	Dorothea Klumpke becomes the first woman to be awarded a doctorate in sciences.	
1893	United States	In 1893, the South Carolina General Assembly mandates "that women should be allowed to attend South Carolina College ] as special students". Two years later, the college's Board of Trustees makes the decision to allow female students into the school.	
1894	Poland	Kraków University opens to women.	
1894	United States	Margaret Floy Washburn becomes the first American woman to be officially awarded the Ph.D. degree in psychology, which she receives from Cornell University.	
1895	Austria-Hungary	Universities open to women.	
1895	United States	Mary Whiton Calkins becomes the first woman to complete the requirements for a PhD in psychology from Harvard University, although Harvard denies her the degree because it does not admit women.	
1895	Egypt	A public school system for girls is organized.	
1896	Norway	Women are admitted to all secondary educational schools of the state.	
1896	Spain	María Goyri de Menéndez Pidal becomes the first Spanish woman to earn a degree in philosophy and letters with a licentiate from the University of Madrid.	
1897	Switzerland	Anita Augspurg becomes the first German woman to receive a Doctor of Law (from the University of Zurich), despite not being able to practice law in Germany until 1922.	
1897	Austria-Hungary	Gabriele Possanner becomes the first woman to receive a medical degree and, subsequently, the country's first practicing female doctor.	
1898	Haiti	The Medical University accepts female students in obstetrics.	
1898	Serbia	Co-education, banned since the 1850s, is re-introduced, equalizing the schooling of men and women.	
1898	United Kingdom	Margaret Murray becomes the first woman lecturer of archaeology in the United Kingdom.	
1899	Germany	Women are admitted to study medicine, dentistry and pharmacy.	

== 20th century ==
=== 1900–1924 ===
Year	Location	Milestone	Ref.
1900	Egypt	A school for female teachers is founded in Cairo.	
1900	United States	Otelia Cromwell becomes the first Black woman to graduate from Smith College in Northampton, Massachusetts.	
1900	Tunisia	The first public elementary school for girls.	
1900	Japan	The first women's university.	
1900	Baden, Germany	Universities open to women.	
1900	Sri Lanka	Secondary education open to women.	
1901	Bulgaria	Universities open to women.	
1901	Cuba	Universities open to women.	
1902	Australia	Ada Evans becomes the first woman to graduate in law at the University of Sydney.	
1903	United States	Mignon Nicholson becomes the first woman in North America to earn a veterinary degree (from McKillip Veterinary College in Chicago, Illinois).	
1903	Canada	Clara Benson and Emma Sophia Baker become the first women to earn a PhD from the University of Toronto.	
1903	Denmark	Girls permitted to attend gymnasium high school.	
1903	Norway	Clara Holst becomes the first woman to earn a Ph.D. in Norway (from Royal Frederick University) with a dissertation was titled Studier over middelnedertyske laaneord i dansk i det 14. og 15. aarhundrede (English: Study of Middle Low German loanwords in Danish in the 14th and 15th centuries).	
1904	United States	Helen Keller graduates from Radcliffe, becoming the first deafblind person to earn a Bachelor of Arts degree.	
1904	United Kingdom	Millicent Mackenzie is appointed as assistant professor of education at the University College of South Wales and Monmouthshire (part of the University of Wales), the first female professor in the UK.	
1904	Württemberg, Germany	Universities open to women.	
1905	United States	Nora Stanton Blatch Barney, born in England, becomes one of the first women to earn a degree in any type of engineering in the United States (in civil engineering Cornell University).	
1905	Argentina	University preparatory secondary education open to women.	
1905	Iceland	Educational institutions open to women.	
1905	Russia	Universities open to women.	
1905	Serbia	Female university students are fully integrated in to the university system.	
1905	Australia	Flos Greig became the first woman to be admitted as a barrister and solicitor in Australia, having graduated in 1903.	
1906	Saxony, Germany	Universities open to women.	
1907	China	Girls are included in the education system.	
1907	Sudan	The first school open to Muslim girls.	
1907	Japan	Tohoku University, the first (private) coeducational university.	
1907	Italy	Rina Monti is named the first female university chair in the Kingdom of Italy.	
1907	Iran	Compulsory primary education for girls.	
1907	Iran	The first Iranian school for girls is established by Tuba Azmudeh, followed by others the following years.	
1908	United States	Alpha Kappa Alpha sorority, the first Black Greek letter organization for women, is founded at Howard University.	
1908	United Kingdom	Edith Morley is appointed Professor of English Language at University College Reading, becoming the first full professor at a British university institute.	
1908	Korea	Secondary education for girls through the foundation of the Capital School for Girl's Higher Education.	
1908	Peru	Universities open to women.	
1908	Prussia, Alsace-Lorraine and Hesse, Germany	Universities open to women.	
1908	Switzerland	The Russian-born Anna Tumarkin becomes the first female professor in Europe with the right to examine doctoral and post-doctoral students.	
1909	United States	Ella Flagg Young becomes the first female superintendent of a large city school system in the United States.	
1909	Spain	María Goyri de Menéndez Pidal becomes the first woman to earn a Ph.D. in Spain, (in philosophy and letters from the University of Madrid).	
1910	United Kingdom	Millicent Mackenzie is promoted to full professor, the first woman to reach this level at a fully chartered university in the UK.	
1911	Luxembourg	A new educational law gives women access to higher education, and two secondary education schools open for girls.	
1912	China	The Chinese government establishes secondary schools for young women.	
1912	Costa Rica	Felícitas Chaverri Matamoros becomes the first female university student at the Pharmacy School; in 1917 she becomes the first Costa Rican female university graduate.	
1912	Japan	Tsuruko Haraguchi becomes the first Japanese woman to earn a Ph.D.	
1912	Canada	The first female professor is hired at a Canadian university.	
1913	United Kingdom	Caroline Spurgeon successfully competes for the newly created chair of English Literature at Bedford College, London, becoming the second female professor in England.	
1914	Sierra Leone	Kathleen Mary Easmon Simango is the first West African woman to become an Associate of the Royal College of Art.	
1915	United States	Lillian Gilbreth becomes the first woman to earn a Ph.D. in industrial psychology (from Brown University with a dissertation titled "Some Aspects of Eliminating Waste in Teaching").	
1917	Greece	The first public secondary educational school for girls is opened.	
1917	Iran	Public schools for girls are opened in order to enforce the law of compulsory education for girls in practice.	
1917	Uruguay	Universities open to women.	
1917	Nicaragua	The first woman obtains a university degree.	
1918	Thailand	Universities open to women.	
1920	Portugal	Secondary schools open to women.	
1920	China	The first female students are accepted at Peking University, soon followed by universities all over China.	
1921	United States	Sadie Tanner Mossell becomes the first African-American woman to earn a Ph.D. in the U.S. (in economics from the University of Pennsylvania).	
1921	Thailand	Compulsory elementary education for both girls and boys.	
1922	United States	Sigma Gamma Rho sorority is founded as the fourth Black Greek letter organization for women and the first Black sorority established on a predominantly White campus, Butler University in Indianapolis, Indiana.	
1923	United States	Virginia Proctor Powell Florence becomes the first Black woman in the United States to earn a degree in library science (with a Bachelor of Library Science from what is now part of the University of Pittsburgh).	
1923	Canada	Elsie MacGill graduates from the University of Toronto in 1927, becoming the first Canadian woman to earn a degree in electrical engineering.	
1923	Egypt	Compulsory education for both boys and girls.	
1923	Australia	Winifred Kiek becomes the first woman to graduate with a bachelor of divinity from the Melbourne College of Divinity.	
1923	Australia	Violet McKenzie becomes the first woman to gain a diploma in electrical engineering (from Sydney Technical College now known as TAFE New South Wales Sydney Institute).	
1924	Russia	Olga Freidenberg becomes the first woman to earn a Ph.D. in classical philology (from Petrograd University).	

=== 1925-1949 ===
Year	Location	Milestone	Ref.
1925	Korea	Professional school for women (at Ewha Womans University).	
1926	United States	May Edward Chinn becomes the first African-American woman to graduate from the University and Bellevue Hospital Medical College.	
1927	Afghanistan	The monarch introduces compulsory education for the daughters of officials.	
1928	Afghanistan	The first women are sent abroad to study (but are banned from studying abroad in 1929).	
1928	Bahrain	The first public primary school for girls.	
1928	Egypt	The first women students are admitted to Cairo University.	
1928	Ghana	Jane E. Clerk is one of two students in the first batch at Presbyterian Women's Training College.	
1929	Greece	Secondary education for girls is made equal to that for boys.	
1929	Nigeria	Agnes Yewande Savage becomes the first West African woman to graduate from medical school, obtaining her degree at the University of Edinburgh.	
1929	United States	Jenny Rosenthal Bramley, born in Moscow, becomes the first woman to earn a Ph.D. in physics in the United States (from New York University).	
1929	United States	Elsie MacGill, from Canada, becomes the first woman in North America, and probably worldwide, to be awarded a master's degree in aeronautical engineering.	
1930	Turkey	Equal right to university education for both men and women.	
1930	Australia	Physician and zoologist Claire Weekes becomes the first woman to gain a doctorate of science at the University of Sydney.	
1931	United States	Jane Matilda Bolin becomes the first Black woman to graduate from Yale Law School.	
1931	United States	Bradford Academy, in Bradford, Massachusetts, changes its name to Bradford Junior College and offers a two-year degree for women.	
1932	United States	Dorothy B. Porter becomes the first African-American woman to earn an advanced degree in library science (MLS) from Columbia University.	
1933	Sierra Leone	Edna Elliott-Horton becomes the first West African woman to receive a baccalaureate degree in the liberal arts on graduating from Howard University.	
1933	United States	Inez Beverly Prosser becomes the first African-American woman to earn a Ph.D. in psychology (from the University of Cincinnati).	
1934	United States	Ruth Winifred Howard becomes the second African-American woman in the United States to receive a Ph.D. in psychology (from the University of Minnesota).	
1935	Iran	Women are admitted to Tehran University.	
1935	United States	Jesse Jarue Mark becomes the first African American woman to earn a Ph.D. in botany (from Iowa State University).	
1936	United States	Flemmie Kittrell becomes the first African American woman to earn a Ph.D. in nutrition (from Cornell University).	
1937	Kuwait	The first public schools open to girls.	
1937	United States	Anna Johnson Julian becomes the first Black woman to receive a Ph.D. in sociology (from the University of Pennsylvania).	
1938	Nigeria	Elizabeth Abimbola Awoliyi becomes the first woman to be licensed to practice medicine in Nigeria after graduating from Trinity College Dublin and the first West African female medical officer with a license of the Royal Surgeon (Dublin).	
1939	United Kingdom	Dorothy Garrod becomes the Disney Professor of Archaeology at the University of Cambridge, making her the first female professor at either Oxford or Cambridge.	
1940	United States	Roger Arliner Young becomes the first Black woman to earn a Ph.D. in zoology (from the University of Pennsylvania).	
1941	United States	Ruth Lloyd becomes the first African-American woman to earn a Ph.D. in anatomy (from Western Reserve University).	
1941	United States	Merze Tate becomes the first African American woman to earn a Ph.D. in government and international relations (from Harvard University).	
1942	United States	Margurite Thomas becomes the first African American woman to earn a Ph.D. in geology (from Catholic University).	
1943	Iran	Compulsory primary education for both males and females.	
1943	United States	Euphemia Haynes becomes the first African-American woman to earn a Ph.D. in mathematics (from Catholic University).	
1945	United States	Zora Neale Hurston becomes the first African-American woman to be admitted to Barnard College.	
1945	United States	Harvard Medical School admits women for the first time.	
1946	Ghana	Jane E. Clerk is among a batch of pioneer women educators in West Africa selected to study at the Institute of Education of the University of London.	
1947	Ghana	Susan Ofori-Atta becomes the first Ghanaian woman to earn a medical degree on graduating from the University of Edinburgh.	
1947	United States	Marie Maynard Daly becomes the first African-American woman to earn a Ph.D. in chemistry (from Columbia University).	
1947	United Kingdom	Cambridge University becomes the last university in the UK to allow women to take full degrees.	
1948	United Kingdom	Elizabeth Hill becomes the first Professor of Slavonic studies at the University of Cambridge.	
1949	United States	Joanne Simpson (formerly Joanne Malkus, born Joanne Gerould) becomes the first woman in the United States to receive a Ph.D. in meteorology (from the University of Chicago).	

=== 1950-1974 ===
Year	Location	Milestone	Ref.
1950	Ghana	Matilda J. Clerk becomes the first woman in Ghana and West Africa to attend graduate school, earning a postgraduate diploma at the London School of Hygiene & Tropical Medicine.	
1950	Ghana	Annie Jiagge, the first woman in the Commonwealth of Nations to become a judge, is called to the Bar at Lincoln's Inn.	
1951	Bahrain	First secondary education school open to girls.	
1951	Ghana	Esther Afua Ocloo becomes the first person of African ancestry to obtain a cooking diploma from the Good Housekeeping Institute in London and to take the post-graduate Food Preservation Course at Long Ashton Research Station, Department of Horticulture, Bristol University.	
1951	United States	Maryly Van Leer Peck, becomes the first female chemical engineering graduate, receiving an M.S. and later a Ph.D. in chemical engineering from the University of Florida.	
1952	United States	Georgia Tech's president Blake R. Van Leer admits the first women to the school and his wife Ella Wall Van Leer sets up support groups for future female engineers.	
1955	Qatar	First public school for girls.	
1957	Southern Rhodesia (today Zimbabwe)	Sarah Chavunduka becomes the first black woman to attend the University College of Rhodesia and Nyasaland (today the University of Zimbabwe).	
1959	United States	Lois Graham becomes the first American woman to earn a PhD in mechanical engineering.	
1962	United States	Martha E. Bernal, born in Texas, becomes the first Latina to earn a Ph.D. in psychology (clinical psychology from Indiana University Bloomington).	
1962	Kuwait	The right to education is secured for all citizens regardless of gender.	
1963	Nigeria	Grace Alele-Williams becomes the first Nigerian woman to earn a doctorate when she earns her Ph.D. in Mathematics Education from the University of Chicago.	
1963	Gambia	Florence Mahoney becomes the first Gambian woman to obtain a Ph.D., graduating from the School of Oriental and African Studies with a doctorate in history.	
1963	Australia	Mary Lockett becomes the first woman appointed as a professor at the University of Western Australia when she was appointed Wellcome Foundation research professor of pharmacology.	
1964	Afghanistan	The 1964 constitution states the equal right of women to education.	
1964	Democratic Republic of the Congo	Sophie Kanza became the first Congolese woman to graduate from a university when she received her diploma from the University of Geneva with a degree in sociology.	
1965	United States	Sister Mary Kenneth Keller becomes the first American woman to earn a Ph.D. in Computer Science (from the University of Wisconsin–Madison with a thesis titled "Inductive Inference on Computer-Generated Patterns".	
1965	Kuwait	Compulsory education for both boys and girls.	
1966	Kuwait	University education open to women.	
1969	United States	Lillian Lincoln Lambert becomes the first African-American woman to graduate from Harvard Business School with an MBA.	
1969	United States	Princeton, Yale, Trinity, and Kenyon open applications to women.	
1970	United States	Williams, Colgate University, Johns Hopkins University, and the University of Virginia allow women to apply for admittance.	
1971	United States	Bradford Junior College in Bradford, Massachusetts changes its name to Bradford College and offers four-year degrees for women starting in 1972.	
1971	United States	Bowdoin, Brown, and Lehigh allow women to apply for admittance.	
1971	Egypt	The new constitution confirms women's right to education.	
1972	United States	Title IX is passed, making discrimination against any person based on their sex in any federally funded educational program(s) in America illegal.	
1972	United States	Willie Hobbs Moore becomes the first African-American woman to receive a Ph.D. in physics (from the University of Michigan).	
1972	United States	Bradford College in Bradford, Massachusetts becomes a co-educational institution (again) after being founded in 1803 as co-educational and then serving exclusively as a female institution of higher learning from 1837 to 1972. Bradford College closed permanently in May, 2000. The Bradford Alumni Association continues today and is the third oldest continuing alumni association in the United States.	
1972	United States	Dartmouth, Davidson, Duke, and College of the Holy Cross allow women to apply for admittance.	

=== 1975-1999 ===
Year	Location	Milestone	Ref.
1974	Pakistan	One of the earliest and largest open universities, Allama Iqbal Open University started providing distance education, making it accessible for women who couldn't attend traditional schooling due to societal or logistical barriers.	
1975	United States	Lorene L. Rogers becomes the first woman named president of a major research university in the United States, the University of Texas.	
1975	United States	On July 1, 1975, Jeanne Sinkford becomes the first female dean of a dental school as dean of Howard University, School of Dentistry.	
1975	United States	Amherst, Claremont, US Naval Academy, West Point, US Airforce Academy and the US Coast Guard Academy allow women to apply for admittance.	
1975	United Kingdom	The Sex Discrimination Act 1975 (c. 65) is an Act of the Parliament of the United Kingdom that protects women from discrimination on the grounds of sex or marital status. The Act covers education among other things.	
1976-1985	International	In 1975, the United Nations declared 1976-1985 the Decade for Women, which profoundly impacted raising awareness about gender inequalities, including those in education. The period witnessed international conferences focusing on women, the first of which was in Mexico City in 1975, the second in Copenhagen in 1980, and the third in Nairobi in 1985.	
1976	United States	U.S. service academies (US Military Academy, US Naval Academy, US Air Force Academy and the US Coast Guard Academy) admit women.	
1977	United States	Harvard's ratio of four men to one woman ends with "sex-blind admissions".	
1977	United States	The American Association of Dental Schools (founded in 1923 and renamed the American Dental Education Association in 2000) appoints Nancy Goorey as its first female president.	
1977	United Kingdom	Women are first allowed to apply for Rhodes Scholarships.	
1978	Afghanistan	Mandatory literacy and education of all women.	
1979	United States	Christine Economides becomes the first American woman to receive a Ph.D. in petroleum engineering (from Stanford University).	
1979	United States	Jenny Patrick becomes the first Black woman in the United States to receive a Ph.D. in chemical engineering (from Massachusetts Institute of Technology).	
1980	United States	Women and men are enrolled in American colleges in equal numbers for the first time.	
1982	United States	The number of bachelor's degrees conferred on women surpasses those conferred on men.	
1982	United States	Mississippi University for Women v. Hogan, 458 U.S. 718 (1982) is a case decided 5–4 by the Supreme Court of the United States which holds that the single-sex admissions policy of the Mississippi University for Women violates the Equal Protection Clause of the Fourteenth Amendment to the United States Constitution.	
1982	United States	Judith Hauptman becomes the first woman to earn a Ph.D. in Talmud (from the Jewish Theological Seminary in New York).	
1983	United States	Christine Darden becomes the first black woman in the U.S. to receive a Ph.D. degree in mechanical engineering (from George Washington University).	
1983	United States	Columbia College of Columbia University allows women to apply for admittance.	
1984	United States	The U.S. Supreme Court's 1984 ruling in Grove City College v. Bell holds that Title IX applies only to those programs receiving direct federal aid. The case reaches the Supreme Court when Grove City College disagreed with the Department of Education's assertion that it was required to comply with Title IX. Grove City College was not a federally funded institution; however, they did accept students who were receiving Basic Educational Opportunity Grants through a Department of Education program. The Department of Education's stance was that, because some of its students were receiving federal grants, the school was receiving federal assistance and Title IX applied to it. The Court decided that since Grove City College was only receiving federal funding through the grant program, only that program had to be in compliance. The ruling was a major victory for those opposed to Title IX, as it made many institutions' sports programs outside of the rule of Title IX and, thus, reduced the scope of Title IX.	
1985	Nigeria	Grace Alele-Williams is appointed vice-chancellor of the University of Benin in 1985, becoming the first female vice-chancellor of any Nigerian university.	
1986	Zimbabwe	To combat gender disparities in higher education, the University of Zimbabwe introduces a quota system to ensure a higher enrollment of women in its programs.	
1987	United States	Johnnetta Cole becomes the first Black president of Spelman College.	
1988	United States	The Civil Rights Restoration Act is passed, extending Title IX coverage to all programs of any educational institution that receives any federal assistance, both direct and indirect.	
1988	Pakistan	Benazir Bhutto became the first woman to lead a Muslim-majority country as Prime Minister. She had been educated at both Oxford and Harvard, and her leadership set a significant precedent in the Muslim world.	
1992	Guatemala	Indigenous K'iche' woman Rigoberta Menchú received the Nobel Peace Prize for her work in social justice and ethno-cultural reconciliation based on respect for the rights of indigenous peoples. Her prominence also highlighted the importance of education and advocacy.	
1994	United States	The Equity in Athletics Disclosure Act, sponsored by Congresswoman Cardiss Collins, requires federally assisted higher education institutions to disclose information on roster sizes for men's and women's teams, as well as budgets for recruiting, scholarships, coaches' salaries, and other expenses, annually.	
1995	China	At the Fourth World Conference on Women of the Beijing Declaration and Platform for Action, governments globally committed to a detailed action plan. It highlighted the importance of ensuring inclusive and equitable quality education for women and girls.	
1996	United States	United States v. Virginia, 518 U.S. 515 (1996), is a landmark case in which the Supreme Court of the United States strikes down the Virginia Military Institute (VMI)'s long-standing male-only admission policy in a 7–1 decision. (Justice Clarence Thomas, whose son was enrolled at VMI at the time, recused himself.)	
1996	Afghanistan	From 1996 until 2001 the Taliban banned girls from receiving any education beyond primary school.	

== 21st century ==
Year	Location	Milestone	Ref.
2001	United States	Ruth Simmons becomes the eighteenth president of Brown University, making her the first Black woman to lead an Ivy League institution.	
2001	Afghanistan	From 1996 until 2001 the Taliban banned girls from receiving any education beyond primary school.	
2002	India	India launched the Sarva Shiksha Abhiyan (SSA) in 2001 as a government program to achieve Universalisation of Elementary Education. This program was particularly notable for its focus on the education of girls and children with special needs. The SSA aimed to provide quality elementary education, including life skills and computer education, to about 193 million children across 1.1 million habitations.	
2004	Rwanda	Rwanda made significant strides in achieving gender parity in education after the 1994 genocide. The government established the Girls' Education Task Force in 2004 to promote education for young girls. Several policies were introduced to continue gender equality in education, such as the Girls Education Policy (2008), the National Education Policy (2010), and the University of Rwanda Gender Policy (2016). These policies dedicated 50% of student university positions to women and addressed the socio-economic barriers hindering girls' education. Rwanda's success in promoting girls' education is evident in the fact that it currently boasts the highest participation rates in East Africa and has achieved gender parity in net and gross enrollment at pre-primary, primary, and secondary levels.	
2005	Saudi Arabia	Saudi Arabia witnessed a significant transformation in higher education for women after 2005, particularly under the Custodian of the Two Holy Mosques Scholarship program introduced by King Abdullah. This program was designed to strengthen Saudi academic institutions and broaden their research and course offerings. It marked a notable shift in the country's approach to female education, with an increase in female graduates leading to incremental improvements in the number of women entering top jobs and earning salaries on par with their male colleagues. This change was part of a broader effort to diversify the Saudi economy and embrace high-tech, creative, and specialized industries under the Kingdom's Vision 2030 reform agenda. The reforms not only enhanced educational opportunities for women but also aimed to align students' qualifications with the job market in Saudi Arabia, thereby raising overall efficiency and developing managerial techniques.	
2006	United States	For the first time, more doctoral degrees are conferred on women than men in the United States. This educational gap has continued to increase in the U.S., especially for master's degrees where over 50% more degrees are conferred on women than men.	
2006	United States	On November 24, 2006, the Title IX regulations are amended to provide greater flexibility in the operation of single-sex classes or extracurricular activities at the primary or secondary school level.	
2007	South Africa	The Oprah Winfrey Leadership Academy for Girls is established in South Africa, aimed at providing educational and leadership opportunities for disadvantaged girls.	
2009	Ethiopia	Physiologist and pharmacologist Yalemtsehay Mekonnen became the first female university professor in Ethiopia, as Professor of Cell and Human Physiology at Addis Ababa University.	
2010	Kenya	Kenya's introduction of free primary education in 2003 led to a significant increase in school enrollment rates, achieving over 90% primary enrollment by 2010 and attaining gender parity in primary schools. However, despite this progress, disparities remained at the regional level, with enrollment being much lower in areas with high poverty levels. In some regions, only 19% of girls were enrolled in school. The policy was particularly effective in reducing the educational gender gap and increasing the overall number of students in primary education, including girls	
2011	India	In April 2011, the Institute for Buddhist Dialectical Studies (IBD) in Dharamsala, India, confers the degree of geshe (a Tibetan Buddhist academic degree for monks and nuns) to Venerable Kelsang Wangmo, a German nun, thus making her the world's first female geshe.	
2013	Saudi Arabia	The Saudi government sanctions sports for girls in private schools for the first time.	
2013	Saudi Arabia	Mai Majed Al-Qurashi becomes the first woman to receive a PhD in Saudi Arabia (from the King Abdullah University of Science and Technology).	
2013	United Kingdom	It is announced that Ephraim Mirvis has created the job of ma'ayan by which women would be advisers on Jewish law in the area of family purity and as adult educators in Orthodox synagogues. This requires a part-time training course for 18 months, the first such course in the United Kingdom.	
2013	Tibet	Tibetan women are able to take the geshe exams for the first time.	
2014	Nigeria	On the night of April 14–15, 2014, 276 female students aged 16 to 18 were kidnapped by the Islamic terrorist group Boko Haram from the Government Girls Secondary School in Chibok, Borno State, Nigeria. This incident drew global attention and led to the launch of the #BringBackOurGirls campaign. The kidnapping highlighted the risks faced by girls pursuing education in conflict areas and the extreme measures taken by Boko Haram against western-style modern education. Despite efforts, many of the kidnapped girls remained missing years after the incident, underscoring the ongoing challenges in the region. The campaign for their release and the international attention it garnered underscored the widespread condemnation of Boko Haram's actions and the global concern for the safety and education of girls in conflict zones.	
2015	Global	The United Nations' Sustainable Development Goals, launched in 2015, included SDG 4 which specifically focuses on ensuring inclusive and equitable quality education for all. One of the main targets of SDG 4 is to eliminate gender disparities in education and to ensure equal access to all levels of education and vocational training for vulnerable groups, including persons with disabilities, indigenous peoples, and children in vulnerable situations. The goal emphasizes the importance of achieving literacy and numeracy for all youth and a significant proportion of adults, both men and women, by 2030. SDG 4 also highlights the need to increase the supply of qualified teachers and to improve infrastructure and facilities for effective learning environments, particularly in Least Developed Countries (LDCs). Despite progress, challenges such as a high number of out-of-school children and adolescents, as well as disparities in educational access and quality, particularly in sub-Saharan Africa and Southern Asia, continue to persist.	
2016	Tibet	Twenty Tibetan Buddhist nuns become the first Tibetan women to receive geshema degrees.	
2016	Global (for Satmar believers)	In 2016 the Satmar sect issues a decree warning that university education for women is "dangerous", and bans women who receive it from their school. Written in Yiddish, the decree warns: It has lately become the new trend that girls and married women are pursuing degrees in special education. Some attend classes and others online. And so we’d like to let their parents know that it is against the Torah. We will be very strict about this. No girls attending our school are allowed to study and get a degree. It is dangerous. Girls who will not abide will be forced to leave our school. Also, we will not give any jobs or teaching position in the school to girls who’ve been to college or have a degree. We have to keep our school safe and we can’t allow any secular influences in our holy environment. It is against the base upon which our Mosed was built.	
2018	California	In 1998 Deep Springs College accepted a $1.8 million low-interest loan under the condition that it would begin admitting women by 2019. In 2011, the college's trustees voted to begin accepting female students in the summer of 2013 but became embroiled in legal challenges which were lodged against the trustees' action. The challengers disputed the authority of the college's board to change the admissions policy and included an injunction preventing the college from accepting female students until at least the 2018–2019 academic year. On April 13, 2017, the California Court of Appeal ruled that the college could admit women in Hitz v. Hoekstra. With the Supreme Court of California declining to hear an appeal, the board of trustees voted once again to admit women, with the first female students arriving in July 2018.	
2018	Afghanistan	Following the ousting of the Taliban regime in 2001 by U.S.-led forces, girls' school attendance in Afghanistan increased significantly. By 2018, over 3.6 million girls were enrolled in schools, marking a substantial rise from previous years, especially in secondary education.	
2020	Global	The impact of the COVID-19 pandemic on girls' education worldwide in 2020 was profound and multi-faceted. UNESCO estimated that 11 million girls might not return to school following the pandemic, with girls aged 12–17 being particularly at risk of dropping out in low and lower-income countries. The challenges were especially acute for girls from low-income households and those in rural areas. The pandemic exacerbated existing inequalities and introduced new threats to girls' education, including increased risks of child marriage, early pregnancy, and gender-based violence. Many girls were married off as a result of the economic pressures of the pandemic on families, leading to increased teenage pregnancies and a rise in rape cases, often resulting in unwanted pregnancies and school dropouts. The pandemic also highlighted the need for greater investment in education and security for girls as resources for the future of the world.	
2022	Afghanistan	In March 2022, the Taliban abruptly reversed their plans to allow girls to resume their secondary school education (defined as grade seven and upwards in Afghanistan). With the exception of the current cohort of university students, this decision leaves graduating from sixth grade as the highest level of educational attainment possible for Afghan women. Secondary schools for boys reopened on schedule.	

== See also ==
- Female education
- Timeline of women's legal rights (other than voting)
- Women's education in the United States
