= Maria Palmgren =

Maria Palmgren may refer to:

- Maria Jonae Palmgren (1630-?), Swedish female scholar
- Maria 'Maikki' Järnefelt-Palmgren (1871-1929), Finnish opera singer
