= Erika Liebman =

Swedish writer (1738 – 1803)

Erika Liebman (1738–1803) was a Swedish poet and academic. She was likely the first woman student at Lund University.

She was the daughter of professor Reinhold Liebman at Lund university and was allowed to attend class. She would thereby be counted as the first woman to have studied at a Swedish university. She continued her studies as an adult, and drew great attention because of her gender.

In November 1756, she was published in Latin in Svenska Merkurius:

Egregias, Scharffi, virtutes optime tractas,
Et quæris genii spargere dona tui.
Ipsa tuos laudo conatus; grator et opto,
Istud quod tractas, sedulitate probes.

She married the vicar Magnus Sommar in Ingelstorp in 1761.

== See also ==
- Aurora Liljenroth
- Betty Pettersson
