= Theodora Lang =

Danish education pioneer

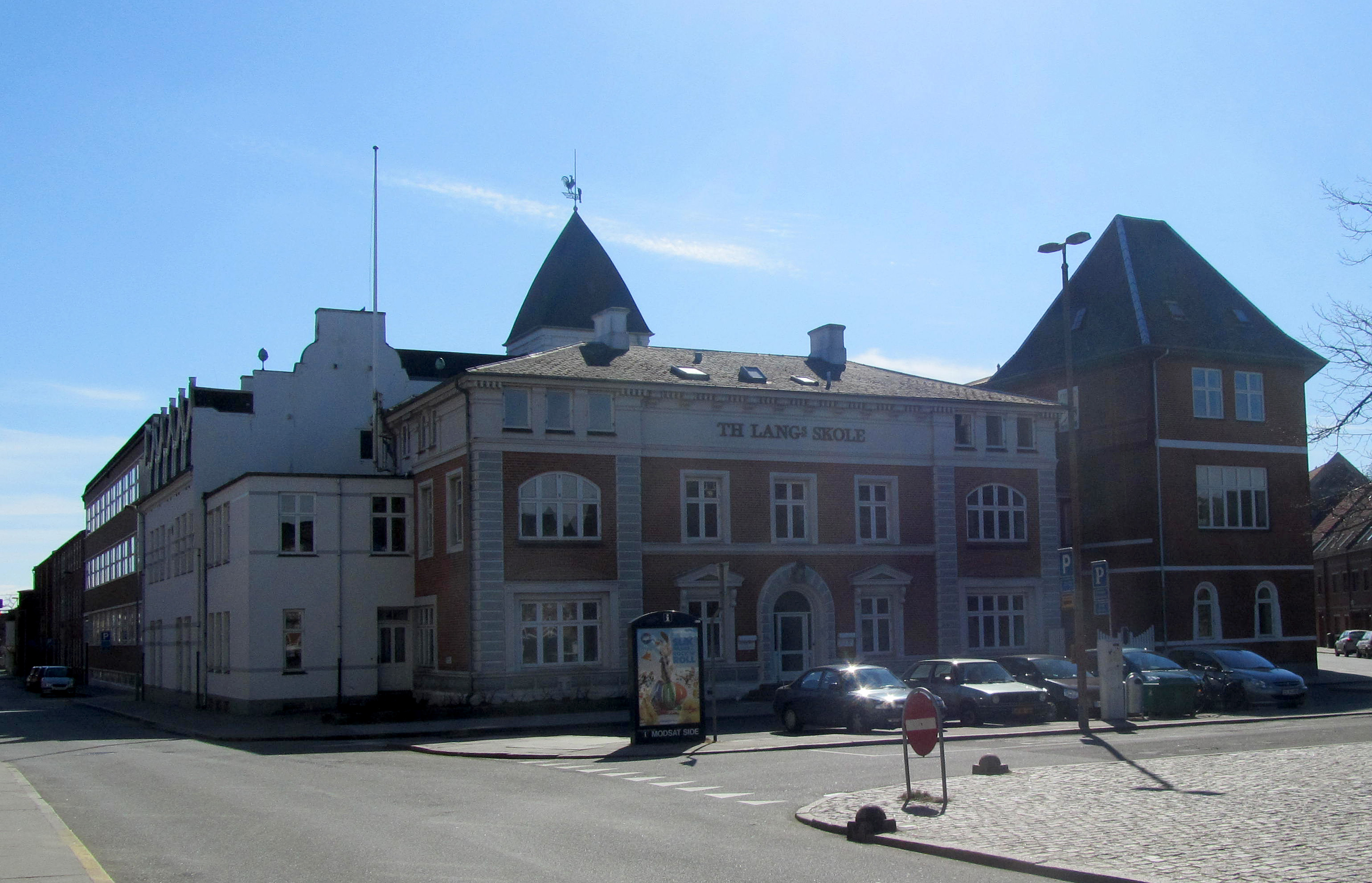
Th. Lang's School was inaugurated in 1882

Theodora Wilhelmine Linderstrøm (3 May 1855 – 16 December 1935) was a Danish pioneer in women's education. A member of the New Education Movement, she founded Th. Lang's School in Silkeborg, Denmark, naming it for her father.

== Biography ==
She was the daughter of the teacher Theodorus Lang (1802–1861) and Ulricha Johanne Linderstrøm (1822–1900). She was educated at home, from 1871 to 1874 at M. Gøtzsche's higher girls' school (M. Gøtzsches højere pigeskole) with courses conducted by Louise Westergaard (1826–1880) and from 1881 to 1882 at N. Zahle's School (N. Zahles Skole), the private school operated by Natalie Zahle (1827–1913).

From 1882, she managed Th. Lang's School (Th. Langs Skole), a girls' school in Silkeborg. In 1886, the first school building was inaugurated. It was designed by the architect Anton Rosen (1859–1928). She had great success, added a women teachers' seminary to her school and was given the right to administer school leaving exams in 1887.

In 1889, she received state aid for a study trip in Germany, Switzerland and France. In 1891–1892, she was given the task by a government minister to lobby for the foundation of a governmental women teacher's training seminary, though she was not successful.

In 1893, she founded the Danish Girls' School Association (Den danske Pigeskole) which held regular debates over issues of women's education; this organized the first exchange between teachers and students in the Nordic countries. In 1906 she was the co-founder of the Girls' School Help and Pension Fund (Pigeskolernes Hjælpe og Pensionskasse).

In 1927, her niece Karen Linderstrøm-Lang (1894–1964) became her successor as seminary leader and principal of the upper secondary school.
