= Louise Westergaard =

Louise Westergaard (27 February 1826 – 6 April 1880) was a Danish reform pedagogue and pioneer on women's education.

Her parents were surgeon Jens Anton Westergaard (1791–1829) and Johanne Wilhelmine Louise Bentzen (1799–1856). Working as a governess, she graduated as a seminar teacher from the Den højere Dannelsesanstalt for Damer of Annestine Beyer in 1851. From 1858 to 1880, she managed a progressive girl school in Copenhagen, regarded as one of the foremost educational institutions for women in Denmark aside from that of her contemporary Natalie Zahle.

She was also active as a writer and translator. In 1853, she had a Thesis of her own printed and published in the press, which was also awarded by the University of Copenhagen, likely the first for a woman in Denmark, though this was not written as a part of any formal university study, which was at that time not yet allowed.
