= Annestine Beyer =

- Born: Anna Kirstine Margrethe Beyer; 4 May 1795
- Died: 9 August 1884 (aged 89)

Academic work
- Notable students: Natalie Zahle
- Main interests: Women's education

Anna Kirstine "Annestine" Margrethe Beyer (4 May 1795 – 9 August 1884), was a Danish reform pedagogue and pioneer on women's education.

== Early life ==
Her parents were the sugar factory owner Hans Petri Beyer (ca. 1747–1806) and Elisabeth Smith Aarøe (*ca. 1763). She was educated at Døtreskolen af 1791. As an adult, she was employed as a teacher at the same school. Convinced of the importance of education of females, and eager to put her ideas of reforms in to practice, she reportedly dominated the school and placed the actual principal in the background. At that time, however, the opportunities for females to educate themselves was very limited and the institutions of learning open to them was largely limited to the capital of Copenhagen. Most female teachers in Denmark in the early 19th-century were employed as governesses rather than at schools.

== Career ==
In 1845, a new law was put in effect regarding the formal competence demanded from a professional teacher, and an educational authority was installed with the task to control this new regulation. At this time, most private teachers in Denmark were female, but they had not formal education as the schools open for girls were still few and no academic institutions were open for adult females. In 1846, she founded the women's seminary Den højere Dannelsesanstalt for Damer to educate professional adult female teachers to serve in the private schools in Copenhagen, and who could meet the demands put upon them by the new school education authority. This was the first academic educational institution for women in Denmark. One of her students were Natalie Zahle (1827-1913) founder of the N. Zahle's School and alongside herself one of the two most notable pioneers of women's education in Denmark, as well as women's rights activists and feminists Louise Westergaard (1826–1880).

In 1859, a new law was put in effect which allowed female teachers a formal degree. However, there were no institutions in existence which could offer such a degree to women. In 1861, Annestine Beyer together with Nicolai Femmer and Gotfred Bohr, arranged for the opening of Beyers, Bohrs og Femmers Kursus (later Femmers Kvindeseminarium) so that it could meet the demands necessary to issue a degree to female teachers.

== Other sources ==
- Hilden, Adda; Nørr, Erik (1993). Lærerindeuddannelse: lokalsamfundenes kamp om seminariedriften [Teacher training: local communities' struggle for colleges] (in Danish). Odense, Denmark: Odense Universitetsforlag. ISBN 8774928848.
