= Aurora Liljenroth =

Swedish academic

Clara Aurora Liljenroth (7 June 1772 – 28 February 1836), also incorrectly referred to as Charlotta Liljeroth, was a Swedish scholar. She was one of few contemporary women to have attended and graduated from the gymnasium (1788) before they were officially opened to women, and attracted attention because of her unique position.

== Biography ==
Aurora Liljenroth was born at Visingsö, Sweden. She was the daughter of professor Sven Peter Liljenroth (1743–1801), lecturer at the Visingsö Gymnasium, and Hedvig Mariana Rudebeck (d. 1779). Liljenroth was accepted as a pupil after having excelled in a test where she gave proof of high academic knowledge in the sciences and Latin. Her father also pointed out that there had been female students at the institution previously. She was formally accepted as a student at the gymnasium at Visingsö 8 December 1780. The same term, she gave a public speech to the school and several other important guests about the return of King Gustav III of Sweden from his travels abroad and about the birth of the Crown Prince. Her position as a student at a gymnasium was unique for her gender, and therefore attracted attention in the press. Her speech about the birthday celebrations of the crown prince in 1781, her speech in verse about the birth of the king's younger son in 1782, and her speech in verse about the birth day celebration of the crown prince in 1786 were all reported in the press.

On 2 November 1788 Aurora Liljenroth gave her graduation talk in French and graduated in "all sciences" with the highest honors and the recommendation that she had the ability to "explain both Cornelium and Ovidium with greater ease and further understanding of the Latin language than other students"

As a person, Aurora Liljenroth were described as shy and introvert, and she reportedly disliked the attention she attracted Her relation to her father was described as tense as he, reportedly, neglected her in private and had her displayed as a "parade doll" in public. The attention directed toward her, in parallel to the contemporary prejudices against education for women, was to have affected her and her opinions against educated women. In her own papers, she wrote: "A sensible woman is anxious about her reputation but fear fame". When she was included in an encyclopedia about women, she was deeply bothered, and when asked whether she was "the learned mademoiselle Liljenroth", she usually answered that the latter was her now deceased sister.

After her graduation, she tended to her father's household. During a stay in Växjö, she met Anders Eneström of Lässebo manor (d. 1824), with whom she married on 14 May 1798. She had five children and her further life was anonymous. She died at Ramsberg, Sweden.

Aurora Liljenroth was included in the encyclopedia of Carl Westrin: Försök till en historia öfver namnkunniga men i synnerhet lärda fruntimmer (Attempts to a history over known but especially learned females) in 1793.

Liljenroth was not the only one of these exceptions. Ursula Agricola from Strasbourg and Maria Jonae Palmgren from Grenna were both accepted at Visingsö Gymnasium in 1644 and 1645 respectively. Hedvig Eleonora Klingenstierna was allowed to give lecture in Latin at the Gymnasium of Linköping, and Erika Leibman (1738–1803), the daughter of a professor at the University of Lund, was allowed to attend the classes and became widely known both in Sweden and other countries as a "learned lady". The first official Swedish female university student after the institutions in Sweden were formally open to women, however, was Betty Pettersson in 1871.

== See also ==
- Sophia Elisabet Brenner
- Anna Åkerhjelm
- Elena Cornaro Piscopia
- Laura Bassi
- Cristina Roccati
- Juliana Morell
- Maria Jonae Palmgren
- Francisca de Lebrija
- Isabella Losa
- Luisa de Medrano
- Beatriz Galindo
- Timeline of women's education
