= Madam Lindes Institut =

School for Danish girls

Madam Lindes Institut was a Danish Girls' School, active in Copenhagen from 1786 until 1845. During its duration, it was one of the largest schools for girls in Denmark, had a special position as it was placed under the protection of the Royal Danish House, and was considered the foremost school for upper class girls in Denmark.

The school was founded by Anette Linde (1763-1815), and managed by her daughters after her death. It accepted pupils between the age of seven and seventeen, divided in five classes. The school was a fashionable and exclusive pension for upper class daughters, and focused on language (French, German and English) and accomplishments. It was in that aspect typical of the many finishing schools common in Copenhagen during the 18th-century, but it was the leading school of its kind during its foundation and the last of its kind. It was protected by the Danish royal court, who financed the localities of the school in exchange for fifteen free pupils from the families of officers. As such, the school received state funding of a kind and was the first school for girls in Denmark who did. It remained one of the largest schools for girls in Copenhagen in 1816, when it had 100 pupils, and as late as 1830, when there were still 90 pupils. After the foundation of the J. Cl. Todes Døtreskole, however, girls' schools of a more serious kind gradually started to replace the kind of finishing schools represented by the Madam Lindes Institut.
