= Natalie Zahle =

Danish women's rights activist (1827–1913)

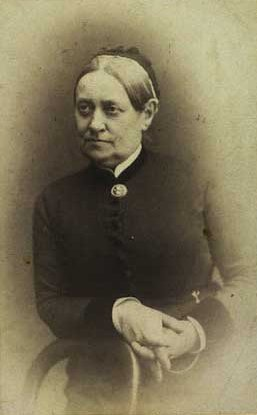
Natalie Zahle

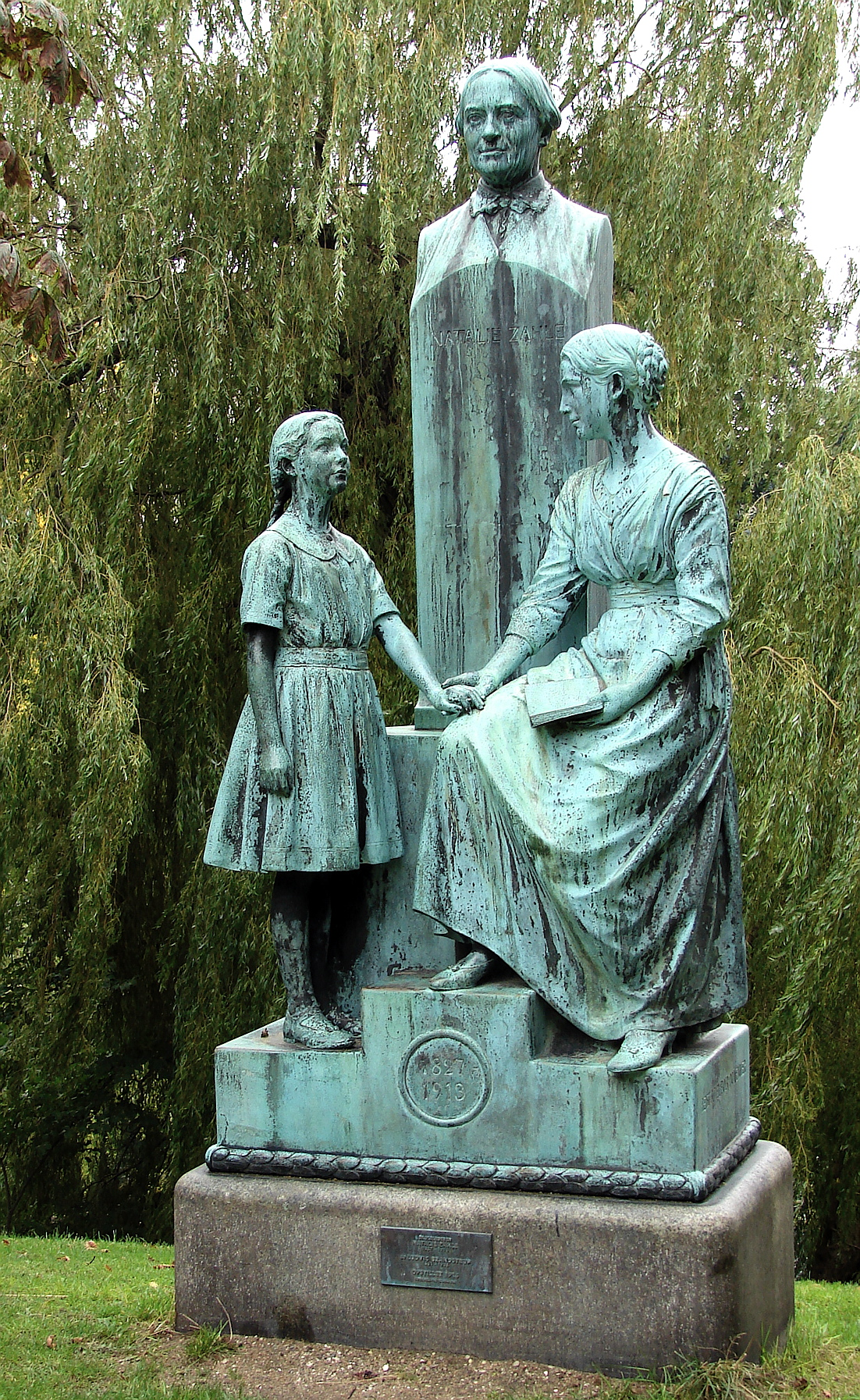
Natalie Zahle Memorial at Ørsted Park in Copenhagen

Ida Charlotte Natalie Zahle (11 June 1827 – 11 August 1913) was a Danish reform pedagogue and pioneer of women's education. She founded N. Zahle's School in 1851.

== Life ==
Her parents were the Roskilde vicar Ernst Sophus Wilhelm Zahle (1797-1837) and Vilhelmine Catharina Louise Böttger (1802–37). After the death of her parents in 1837, she lived first with her mother's parents and then as the foster child of professor and zoologist Daniel Frederik Eschricht (1798–1863) and his wife. She was educated at the girls' school Døtreskolen af 1791 in Copenhagen, and supported herself as a governess.

In 1849, she became a student at the newly founded women's teacher seminary Den højere Dannelsesanstalt for Damer. Operated by Annestine Beyer (1795–1884), it was the first school in Denmark to offer women a professional academic education. After having graduated from that school in 1851, she opened her first girls' school.

=== Career ===
In 1852, she founded the N. Zahle's School (N. Zahles Skole). Her school became a famous pioneer educational institution. Known as a well-organized person, she expanded the school from 25 students in 1852 to 200 in 1862, and was known for her selection of teachers. Many famous individuals were teachers or students there. Employing both formally uneducated female teachers as well as educated male teachers, she combined the idea of the mother as the most important teacher and the school as a home, with the modern ideas of academically merited teachers and the school as an institution of disciplined education, and was regarded to have formed a good balance between these two contradictory leading contemporary ideas, which was regarded as a great success. She also combined the traditional view that females should foremost be educated to be accomplished ornaments by education in the arts, with the progressive idea that they, as well as males, should be educated to be active, hardworking, creative and strong willed professionals, by educating them to be both.

Her way of creating a balanced combination through traditional and progressive values was called her double strategy. This was also the case with her position on other women's issues. She refused to choose between difference feminism and equality feminism and insisted on both in parallel. Many of the first generation of women's pioneers within various fields and women's rights activists, including Anna Hude, Ida Falbe-Hansen, Lis Jacobsen, Ingrid Jespersen, Erna Juel-Hansen and Theodora Lang were at one time her students.

Zahle has been regarded as a pioneer within the women's movement, though she never herself engaged in any women's rights activism in public outside of her educational works. Until around 1900, the Danish government did not involve itself much in the education of females, and Natalie Zahle was a great innovator in reforming the education of women in Denmark during the 19th century. In her school, females were offered primary education as children, and then moved on to secondary education as preparation for university studies (which became available in 1875), for taking free courses, or being educated as teachers. She started a school for female teachers in 1851, a children's primary school in 1852, free courses in 1861, physical education in 1864, a musical school in 1869, a gymnasium (school) (necessary after the universities had been opened to women in Denmark in 1875) in 1877, administered the Studentereksamen (as the first girls' school in Denmark) from 1885, health care in 1880, household school in 1882, and a government seminary in 1894.

== Honors ==
She was awarded the Medal of Merit in gold (Fortjenstmedaljen i guld) in 1891.

The Natalie Zahle Memorial is located in Ørsted Park in Copenhagen, close to the school that she founded in 1862. It is a bronze, granite statue designed Danish sculptor Ludvig Brandstrup (1861–1935) was erected during 1916.
