= Natalie Zahle Memorial =

Statue of Anders Sandøe Ørsted in Copenhagen, Denmark

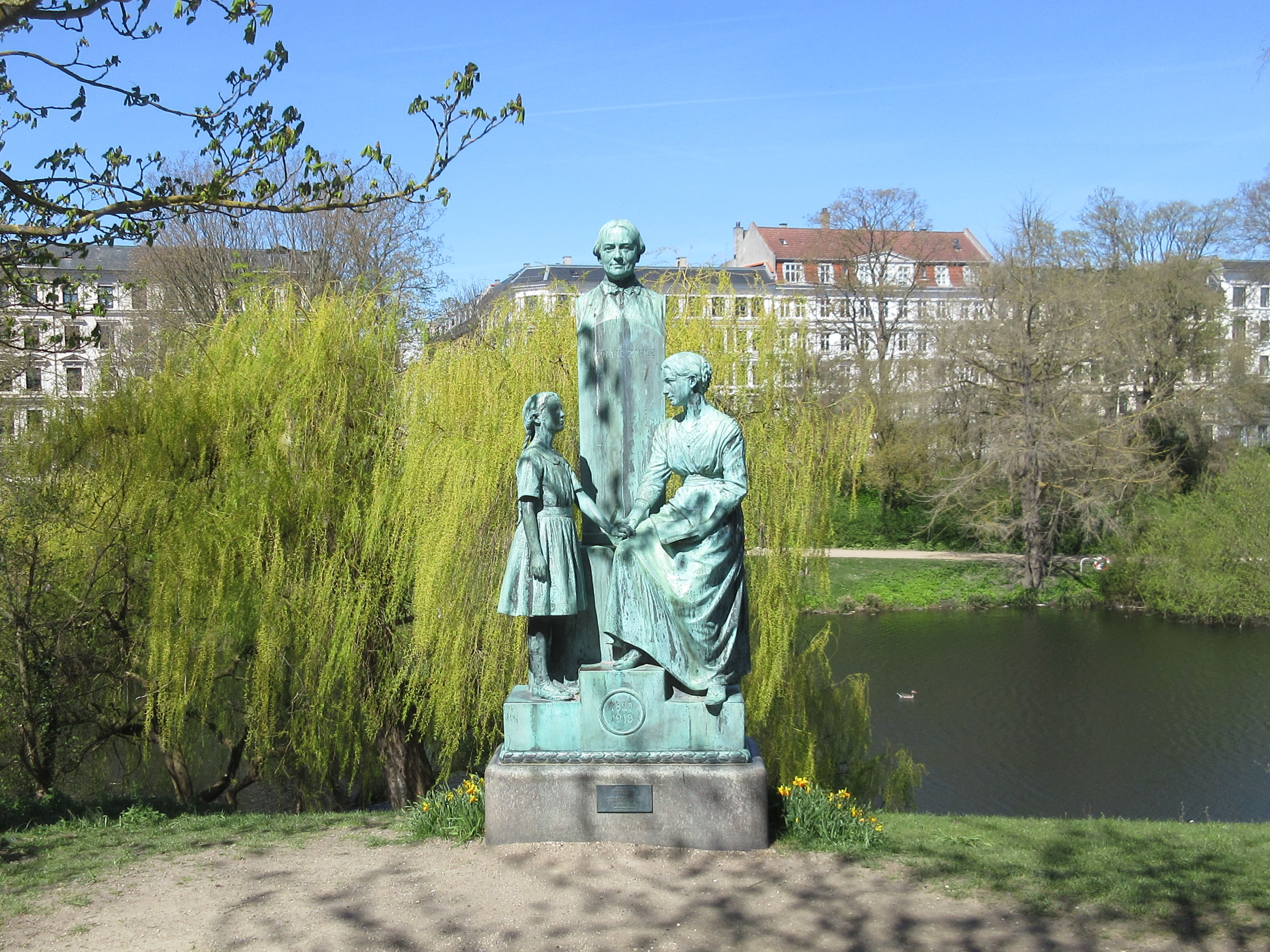
- The statue in April 2026.
- Artist: Ludvig Brandstrup
- Year: 1916
- Medium: Bronze
- Subject: Natalie Zahle
- Location: Copenhagen

The Natalie Zahle Memorial is located in Ørsted Park in Copenhagen, Denmark, close to the school that she founded in 1862. The school became a model for all upper secondary girl's schools in the country. The Natalie Zahle Memorial was the first monument in Copenhagen erected in honour of a woman who was not of royal ancestry and had exclusively gained prominence on the basis of her own merit.

== Description ==
The memorial stands 286 cm (9.38 ft) tall and consists of a bronze group sculpture mounted on a low granite plinth. The centerpiece of the bronze sculpture is a bust of Nathalie Zahle on a tall, integrated pedestal. In front of the bust is a figure of a seated female school teacher holding the hand of a young, female student. The teacher holds an open book in her other hand and the girl has a distant, thoughtful look as if she is being examined in her homework. The scene represents the close relationship between teacher and student that Zahle endorsed.

== History ==
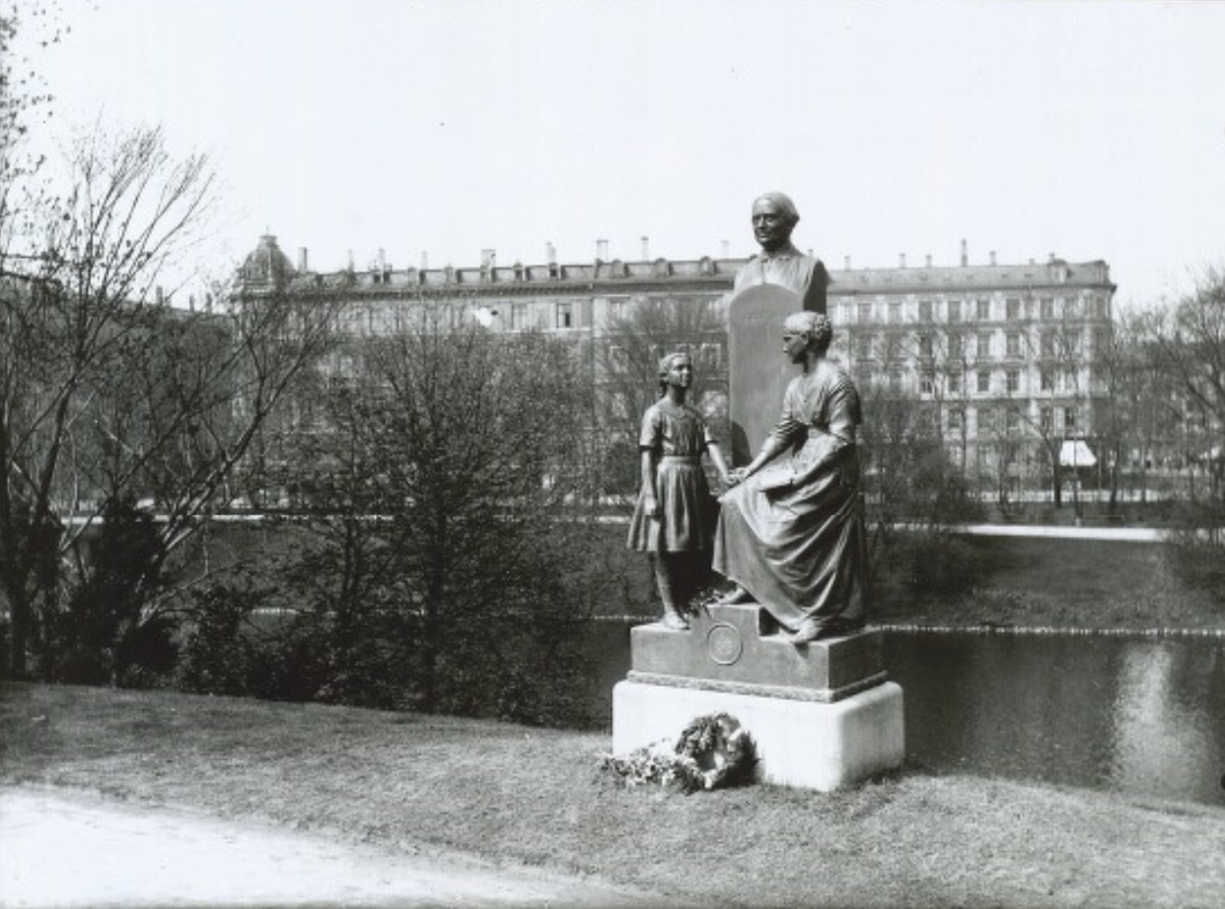
The memorial on an old photograph

The memorial was created at the initiative of the Committee for the Creation of a Monument to Natalie Zahle. Financing for the memorial was mainly by donations from friends and former students. Ludvig Brandstrup was charged with designing the monument and the location was selected due to its proximity to Zahle's school. The bronze sculptures were cast in Lauritz Tasmussen's Bronze Foundry in Nørrebro. The memorial was unveiled in 1916.
