= Gotlands nation =

Student nation of Uppsala University

Coordinates: 59°51′35″N 17°38′5″E

Gotlands Nation
- Uppsala University
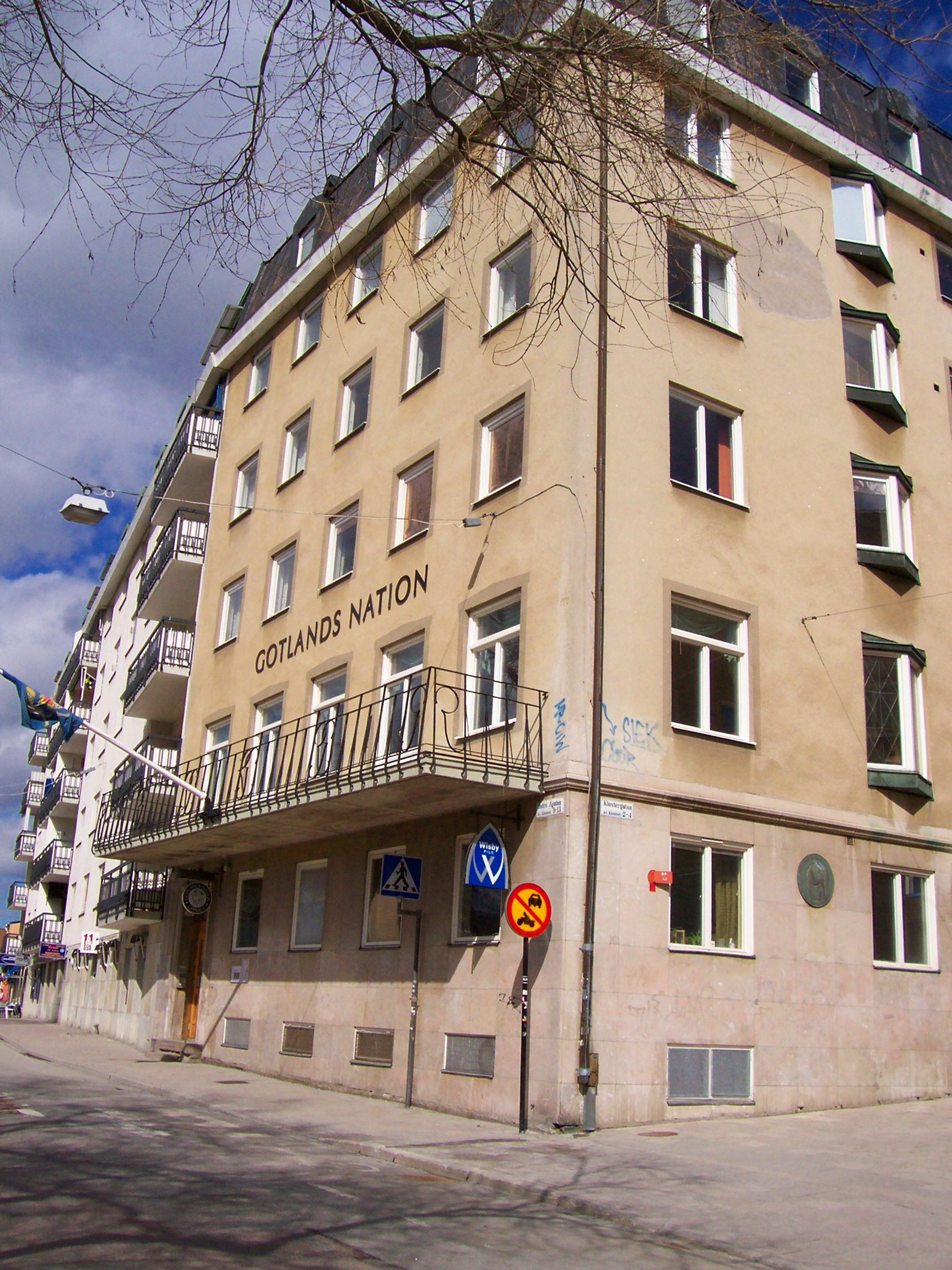
- Location: Östra Ågatan 13; 753 22 UPPSALA; Sweden
- Latin name: Natio Gothlandicae
- Abbreviation: N/A
- Established: 1663
- Inspektor: Lars Magnusson
- Membership: approx. 600
- Website: www.gotlandsnation.se

Gotlands nation is one of the 13 student nations at Uppsala University. It is named for the island of Gotland, where most of its students come from.

The nation is primarily known for its Lambskallegasque; An annual dinner where gratinated lambs head is served as the main course. Gotlands is one of the smallest of Uppsala's nations, rarely going above 800 members. It is also notably the only nation in Uppsala with its nation building on the east side of the River fyris.

The nation was formed in 1681 and was the nation of Betty Pettersson (1838-1885), the first female student at a Swedish university, after whom Gotlands names its pub.

== Inspektors ==
Gotlands nation

- Daniel Lipstorpius 1663-16?? (Probably between 1668-1672)
- Claudius Arrhenius 16??-1685
- Nicolaus Wolff 1685-1694
- Petrus Lagerlöf 1694-1699
- Jesper Svedberg 1699-1703
- Johan Esberg 1703-1712
- Johannes Steuchius 1712-1724
- Petrus Schyllberg 1724-1737
- Johannes Ihre 1738-1780
- Per Svedelius 1781-1805
- Jacob Åkerman 1805-1829
- Josef Otto Höijer 1829-1833
- Johan Henrik Schröder1833-1857
- Olof Glas 1857-1877
- Theodor Magnus Fries 1878-1899
- K. J. V. Sjögren 1900-1909
- Rutger Sernander 1909-1931
- Anton Friedrichsen 1932-1938
- Gunnar Blix 1939-1943
- Gunnar Hägg 1944-1948
- Ivan Engnell 1949-1964
- Torgny Säve-Söderbergh 1964-1974
- Helmer Ringgren 1974-1983
- Sonja Calais van Stokkom 1983-1996
- Lars Magnusson 1997-2025
- Erik Smitterberg 2025-
