= Cristina Roccati =

Italian physicist and poet (1732–1797)

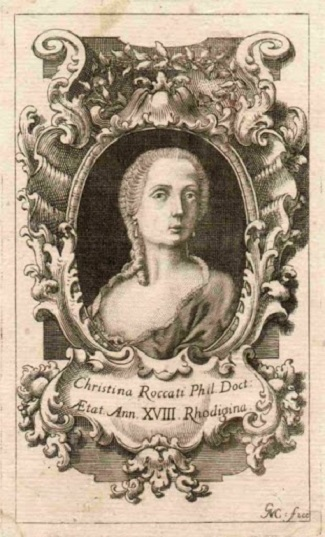
- Born: 24 October 1732; Rovigo, Italy
- Died: 16 March 1797 (aged 64); Rovigo, Italy
- Burial place: Chiesa dei Santi Francesco e Giustina (Rovigo)
- Education: University of Bologna
- Occupations: physicist and poet

Cristina Roccati (24 October 1732 in Rovigo – 16 March 1797 in Rovigo) was an Italian physicist and poet who earned a degree at the University of Bologna (1751). This was the third academic qualification ever bestowed on a woman by an Italian university.

== Biography ==
Roccati was born to Giovan Battista and Antonia Campo, who belonged to a well-off family in Rovigo, Italy.

Roccati studied classical languages under Peter Bertaglia Arquà, rector of the seminary at Rovigo, and at the age of 15 she won accolades from the Accademia dei Concordi Ordna for her poems. In 1747, she was given permission by her parents to study natural philosophy at the University of Bologna under the guardianship of Bertaglia. There, she was admitted to the university the same year as the first non-Bolognese student. She studied literature, logic, metaphysics, morality, meteorology and astronomy, but she concentrated much of her effort on physics and natural science.

She was decorated for her poems and sonnets in Bologna, just as she had been in Rovigo. She became a member of the Academy of Concordia (1749) and became a 'Prince' of the academy in 1754. She was also a member of the Accademia degli Apatisti in Florence (1750) and the Accademia nell'Arcadia (under the name Aganice Aretusiana) (1753), as well as the Accademia degli Ardenti in Bologna and the Ricoverati in Padua.

On 5 May 1751, during a time when opportunities for higher education were often denied to women, Roccati, who was considered a prodigy, was awarded a degree in philosophy becoming, according to Wertheim, "only the third woman ever to gain academic qualifications." She went on to study at the University of Padua with concentrations in Newtonian physics, Greek and Hebrew, while continuing to cultivate her literary interests and compose new verses. Beginning in 1751, she was active as a teacher in physics at the Accademia dei Concordi di Rovigo (and taught there until at least 1777). In 1752, however, her family fell into financial ruin forcing her to interrupt her studies at Padua and return home to Rovigo where she taught physics.

At the Accademia dei Concordi in Rovigo, Roccati held evening courses in Newtonian physics for other members. Of her lesson plans for those lectures, only 51 have been found. In 1754, she was elected president of the Accademia dei Concordi of Rovigo.

Cristina Roccati died in Rovigo on 16 March 1797.

== See also ==
- Elena Cornaro Piscopia
- Laura Bassi
- Sophia Elisabet Brenner
- Aurora Liljenroth
- Timeline of women in science
