= J. Cl. Todes Døtreskole =

Former girls' school in Denmark

J. Cl. Todes Døtreskole ("Daughter School of J. Cl. Tode") was a girls' school founded in Copenhagen, Denmark in 1787. It was the first school in Denmark to give secondary education to females, and the mother school and predecessor of the first lasting secondary education school for girls, the Døtreskolen af 1791.

== History ==
The school was founded on 4 September 1787 by the doctor Johan Clemens Tode, and the school was named after him. At that time, the interest for a proper formal education was great among the wealthy burgher class of Copenhagen. Two secondary schools for boys were founded during that period, and a school for girls was deemed necessary as well.

While the argument for founding a school for boys had been that men needed formal education to fill their place as active citizens and businesspeople in society, the argument for starting a school for girls was that the future wives and mothers of citizens needed to have at least basic knowledge in academic and scientific subjects to assist and support their husbands and educate their children, which was a common and successful argument for women's education in Europe at that time. In 1787, there were no schools for girls in Copenhagen, except girls' pensions and Finishing schools such as Madam Lindes Institut.

In contrast to the finishing schools, J. Cl. Todes Døtreskole offered academic subjects more equal to that of boys, and was thus a pioneer school in Denmark. It was also very popular among the Copenhagen merchant class when it opened. However, information about the school is very limited. The parents complained that the teachers were uneducated, that some of the students were of insufficient social status and set bad examples, and that they were given no influence in the school, and when a member of the school board expressed himself negatively about the education of women, the parents removed their daughters from the school, formed an association and founded their own school, the Døtreskolen af 1791.
