= Den højere Dannelsesanstalt for Damer =

Den højere Dannelsesanstalt for Damer (literary: 'Higher Educational Institute for Ladies'), from 1861 Femmerske Kursus til Uddannelse af Skolelærerinder (literary: 'Femmer's Educational Course for Women School Teacher's') and from 1885 Femmers Kvindeseminarium (literary: 'Femmer's Women's Seminary '), was a teacher's training seminary for women in Copenhagen in Denmark, founded in 1846 and closed in 1937-1938. It was the first secondary educational institution for women in Denmark.

== History ==
=== Pioneer institution ===
In 1845, the Copenhagen educational direction founded a new school authority to control the qualifications for professional private school teachers in the capital from that point on. Most private schools in Copenhagen were managed by women teachers, but as there were no secondary schools open for women, it was not possible for them to have any formal training as teachers or to pass the new regulations.

In order to solve this issue, a teacher's seminary for women was founded in 1846 by Annestine Beyer and Emil Bojsen to address this problem, named Den højere Dannelsesanstalt for Damer.

Initially, the school shared its localities with the Døtreskolen af 1791, itself the perhaps most prestigious girls' school in Denmark and until then an informal training school for women as many women teachers were pupils there as children and allowed to practice as assistant teachers there. Den højere Dannelsesanstalt for Damer was the first institution of secondary education for women in Denmark. In order to meet all formal qualifications, the school employed male teachers, as they were until that point the only teachers with formal qualifications, a problem the school was founded to address.

=== Reforms ===
In 1859, a nation-wide reform introduced the right for women to pass training exams as teachers in Denmark (in contrast to the previous local Copenhagen-reform). This was a major step in women's rights in Denmark, but it also presented a problem, as there was no secondary education school for women with qualifications to issue exams to its students. When Annestine Beyer was asked in 1860 by two women, Emma Holmsted and Hedvig Rosing, if it would be possible for them to make use of the new law and pass their exams at her school, Beyer decided to re-organize her school to meet with the regulations needed for a school to be able to issue exams. In 1861, she opened a teacher's examen course in her school with the cooperation of the male teachers Nicolai Femmer and Godfred Bohr, which made it possible for women to be given formal exams in Denmark.

Beyer retired in 1880 and Bohr in 1886, and the school was taken over by Nicolai Femmer who named it accordingly. In 1901, a Volksschule seminary, the Kbh.s Forskoleseminarium, was also opened on the initiative of Kirstine Frederiksen and Emilie Jansen

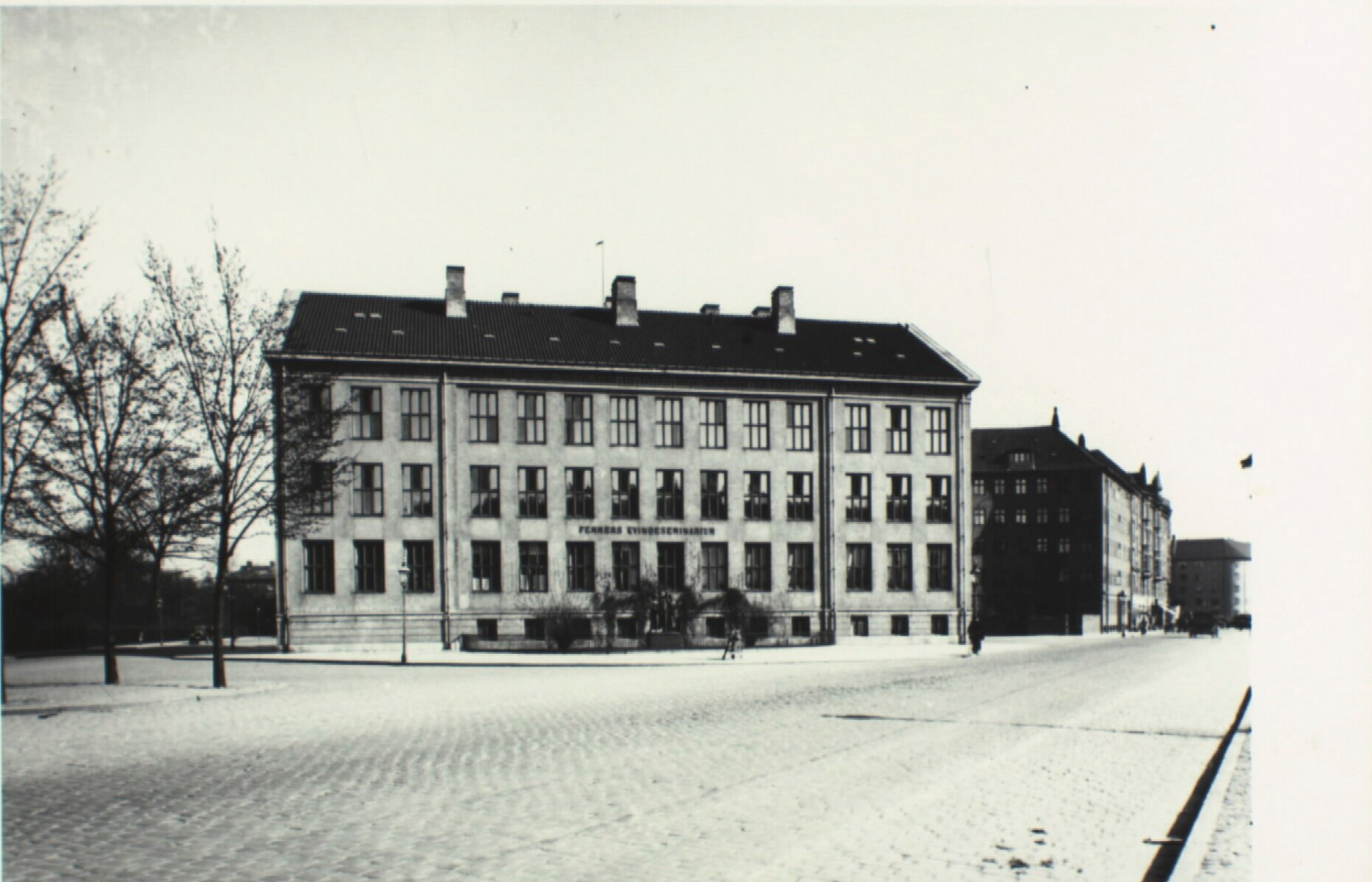
Femers Kvindeseminarium at Struensegade 50 in Copenhagen.

A new building for the school designed by Alf Cock-Clausen was om 1922–23 constructed in Struensegade in Nørrebro. The school was closed in 1937, with the Kbh.s Forskoleseminarium closing the following year.

=== Legacy ===
Several known figures of Danish history was employed or educated in the school, among them Augusta Fenger, Ida Emilie Rambusch, Elise Femmer, and Marie Lønggaard, and until the 1860s, most of Denmark's women reform educators were educated there, among them Natalie Zahle and Louise Westergaard.

== See also ==
- Royal Seminary
