= Døtreskolen af 1791 =

Døtreskolen af 1791 ("Daughter School of 1791") was a girls' school active in Copenhagen, Denmark from 1791 until 1899. It is considered one of the first schools in Denmark to give secondary education to females. Several well known people were students at Døtreskolen, including the educational pioneer Annestine Beyer.

== History ==
The school was founded on 12 September 1791. The first serious secondary school for girls (as opposed to finishing schools) in Copenhagen had been J. Cl. Todes Døtreskole, founded in 1787, but the parents had been so discontented with it that they had closed it down in 1791 by removing their daughters from it.

The parents of the former students of the closed school, belonging principally to the Copenhagen merchant class, formed a society which started the Døtreskolen af 1791. The students were given education in scientific subjects after the pattern of boys' schools, which made it a pioneer institution.

Until the 1840s, when a large number of secondary girls' schools were founded in Denmark, there were only three schools in Copenhagen to provide secondary education to females, of which this was the oldest.

In 1846 another pioneer institution for women's education in Denmark, the Den højere Dannelsesanstalt for Damer, was founded in the same building and shared localities with the school for the first period of its existence.

== Location ==
The school was based at Østergade matr No. 34 (same building as Efterslægtselskabet) in 1794. In 1839-43, it was based at Store Købmagergade 53 in Frimand's Quarter. In 1844-49, it was based at Pilestræde No. 84 in Købmager Quarter. In 1850-52, it was based at Borgergade in St. Ann's West Quarter. In 1853-68, it was based at Vingårdsstræde No. 133 in the East Quarter.

== Other sources ==
- Adda Hilden (1993) Lærerindeuddannelse (Odense Universitetsforlag)
- Tone Skinningsrud (2012) Fra reformasjonen til mellomkrigstiden. Framveksten av det norske utdanningssystemet (Tromsø: University of Tromsø. Doctor Philosophiae.)
- Carl Bruun (1901) Kjøbenhavn (Copenhagen: Thiele)
- Johannes Christoffer Hagemann Reinhardt Steenstrup (1917) Den danske kvindes historie: fra Holbergs tid til vor, 1701-1917 (Copenhagen: H. Hagerup)
- Carol Gold (1996) Educating Middle Class Daughters: Private Girls Schools in Copenhagen 1790–1820 (Museum Tusculanum Press) ISBN 978-8772893730

== Related reading ==
- Realskolen gennem 200 år. Danmarks Privatskoleforening, 2010. bl.a.Bd.2 s.82ff.
- Sources in Copenhagen Local Historic Archives
