= Betty Pettersson =

Swedish teacher (1838–1885)

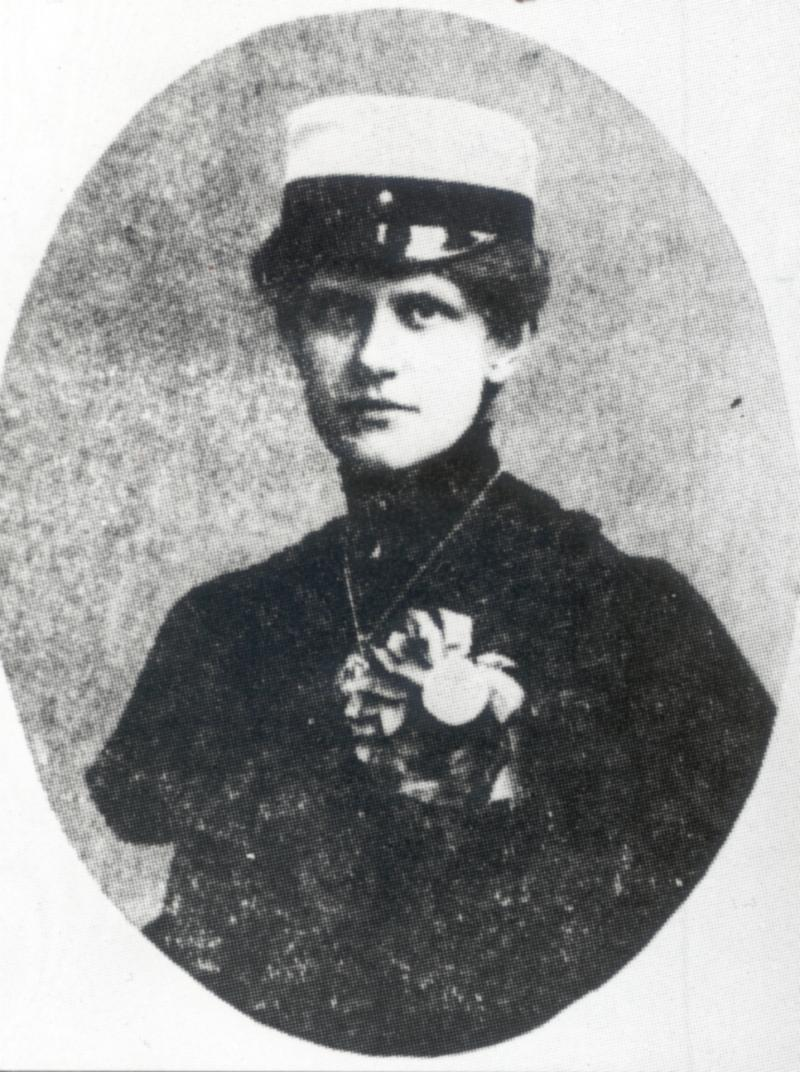
- Betty Pettersson, the first woman to study in a Swedish university.
- Born: 14 September 1838; Visby, Sweden
- Died: 7 February 1885 (aged 46); Stockholm, Sweden
- Occupation: teacher

Betty Maria Carolina Pettersson (14 September 1838 – 7 February 1885), was a Swedish teacher. She became the first official female university student in Sweden in 1871. She was also the first female student of Uppsala University, the first woman in Sweden to have graduated from a university, and the first woman to have been a teacher at a gymnasium.

== Life ==
Betty Pettersson was born to the saddle maker Olof Pettersson and Magdalena Sofia Carolina Kullberg in Visby. She was not born into a wealthy family; however, when she was discovered to be a talented student, she was given the opportunity to study at a private girls' school in Visby, where normally only pupils from wealthy families were accepted. As an adult, she worked as a governess for several different families of nobility from the 1850s onward.

By a reform in 1870, women were given the right to study at universities. Pettersson was accepted as a student the same year, though she did not begin her studies on the first attempt. She graduated from Nya elementarskolan in Stockholm 16 May 1871 as the first of her sex to do so. This being a school for males, and no Gymnasium (school) being available yet for women (Wallinska skolan was the first girls' school given the right to administer the Studentexamen in 1874), she was forced to study in private, as a so-called privatist, and then graduate from the Nya elemantarskolan. Again a pioneer, she was accepted at Uppsala university 27 February 1872. Finally, she became historical upon her graduation on 28 January 1875. She was met with a great deal of dislike from many male fellow students.

After graduation, she worked as a teacher at a Gymnasium (school) for boys, the Ladugårdslands lägre elementarläroverk, from 1877 until 1884. She was again a pioneer as the first female teacher at a Gymnasium (school). As a person, she was described as dutiful, popular among her students, and a skillful educator. As a teacher, she was described: "To this her call she gave her entire soul; further more, she had the ability, in a very high degree, to win the trust and affection of her pupils and through this she influenced their conduct in no less degree; her class was always notable for its good order and conduct."

Betty Pettersson died of consumption.

== Legacy ==
Betty was a member of Gotland nation and the nation today names its pub 'Bettys' after her.

== See also ==
- Aurora Liljenroth, the first female in Sweden to have graduated from a Gymnasium (school) in 1788.
