= Maria Jonae Palmgren =

Swedish scholar (1630–1708)

- Born: 1630; Gränna, Sweden
- Died: 28 May 1708 (aged 77–78)
- Education: Count Brahe College
- Occupation: Scholar

Maria Jonae Palmgren (1630, Gränna – before 28 May 1708) was a Swedish female scholar.

In 1645, she was accepted as a student at the Visingsö college of Count Brahe. Alongside her fellow student, the German Ursula Agricola from Strassburg, who was accepted one year prior (1644), she is likely to have been the first female student in Sweden: the next student of her sex at the same school was Aurora Liljenroth in 1780.

After her studies, Palmgren married her fellow student, the official of count Brahe, Peter Wickenberg.
