= Filippo Monti =

Italian architect (1928–2015)

- Born: 10 January 1928; Faenza, Italy
- Died: 15 December 2015 (aged 87); Faenza, Italy
- Occupation: Architect

Filippo Monti (10 January 1928 – 15 December 2015) was an Italian architect. His work, characterized by rational rigor and sensitivity to context, is considered among the most elegant and original expressions of twentieth-century architecture in Romagna.

== Biography ==
Il rispetto del passato e la speranza di quello che verrà: questo è il fondamento della mia architettura.
Respect for the past and hope for what is to come: this is the foundation of my architecture.

— Filippo Monti

=== Education ===
In 1942 he enrolled at the Technical Institute for Surveyors in Faenza, and in 1947 he obtained his diploma.
Between 1947 and 1948 he devoted himself to painting, producing portraits and figure studies now preserved in private collections. He attended the art school in Faenza under the guidance of Francesco Nonni and found inspiration in Giovanni Romagnoli and Franco Gentilini, but the prevailing models, still tied to the interwar period, limited his interest.
In 1948 he enrolled in the Faculty of Architecture in Florence. The environment was difficult and the professors did not provide clear guidance. He followed with interest the course of Carlo Maggiora, and in 1952 he met Adalberto Libera, who supported him and analyzed his projects. He studied independently the masters of the Modern Movement: he was struck by Adolf Loos, drew closer to Le Corbusier, but above all to Richard Neutra and Ludwig Mies van der Rohe. In 1953 he was awarded a scholarship for the United States, but was unable to make use of it for financial reasons.
In 1954 he defended his thesis on a covered velodrome with tensile structures, under the supervision of Adalberto Libera, whom he later followed to Rome to participate in the competition for the Velodrome of the 1960 Olympics, which he ultimately declined.

=== Career ===
In 1955 he returned to Faenza and taught geometric drawing at the School of Arts and Crafts until 1958, collaborating with his close friend, painter, sculptor, and ceramist Domenico Matteucci. In 1957 he won first prize in the competition for the Church of San Vincenzo de’ Paoli in Bologna, overseen by Giuseppe Vaccaro and Luigi Figini; with the latter he formed a friendship that led them to visit together works of European Rationalism. Monti designed houses in Forlì and for the INA-Casa plan, but found competitions to be the most stimulating field.
In 1959, together with his friend, architect Arturo Locatelli, he presented the general urban plan of Faenza, introducing innovative solutions for traffic circulation and pedestrian spaces. In the same year, he designed the Hotel Bellevue in Milano Marittima, a well-known seaside resort district of Cervia.
In 1960 he designed the Alberghi Grossi House, his first work in Faenza. This was followed by the Rovelli House and the Maternal Nursery in Granarolo (Faenza), inspired by the Pompeian domus.
From 1964 to 1971 he was a member of the board of Italia Nostra in Faenza. During this period, he designed the Santa Margherita residential complex, the Woodpecker Night Club in Milano Marittima, his own house, and the second Porisini House. He also took part in the competition for the Sports Palace in Florence, without success.
Between 1972 and 1980 he adopted a simpler and more geometric language. His main work from this period is the residential complex on via Ferrari in Faenza, followed by the Sassi House and the 'Le Logge' complex, with a strong focus on the relationship with nature.
From 1981 he went through a professional crisis. In 1985 he designed the Ciba Leasing offices. Between 1986 and 1995 he received public commissions, including the Faenza Post Office, the renovation of the Ravenna Chamber of Commerce, originally designed by architect Antonino Manzone, and the Faenza Exhibition Hall. In these projects he paid particular attention to construction details.
Between 1996 and 2004 he went through a difficult period, also marked by the premature death of his daughter Anna Rita. He alternated small projects with the translation of the Divine Comedy into the Romagnol dialect, published in 2003. Critics recognized its value: in 1996 the magazine Polis devoted a monographic feature to him, and in 2003 the interview volume Filippo Monti in conversation with Franco Bertoni was published.
In 2005 he designed the Boscherini House and began projects for the Gargiulo House and the renovation of the D’Atri House.
In his later years, together with the urban planner and architect Ennio Nonni, he devoted himself to ceramics and created sculptural vases, exhibited in his first and only exhibition at the Bottega Bertaccini in Faenza in December 2015.

== Works ==
=== Architecture ===
==== Works of recognized interest ====
Works listed in the General Catalogue of Italian Cultural Heritage and in the Italian Census of Contemporary Architecture

Title	Address	Municipality	Years
Church of San Vincenzo de' Paoli	Via Adelaide Ristori 1	Bologna	1956-1971
D’Atri House and Apartments	Via Luigi Carlo Farini 13	Faenza	1962-1963
Santa Margherita Residential Complex	Via Firenze 75–77	Faenza	1963-1976
Monti House	Via Torino 7	Faenza	1964-1968
"Le Vele" Row Houses	Via Luigi Carlo Farini 21–33	Faenza	1968-1970
Woodpecker Nightclub	Viale Nullo Baldini 20	Cervia	1969
Sassi House	Via San Biagio Antico 20	Faenza	1972-1975
"Le Terrazze" Residential Complex (Le Logge)	Viale Vittorio Veneto 31–33	Faenza	1975-1981
New Post Office Building	Via Naviglio 16	Faenza	1984
Ciba Leasing Office Building	Via Augusto Righi 3	Faenza	1985-1987
Chamber of Commerce Extension	Viale Luigi Carlo Farini 14	Ravenna	1988-1990
Shops and Apartments in Piazza del Popolo	Piazza del Popolo	Faenza	1992-1994

=== Literature ===
- The Divine Comedy in Romagnol dialect
  - E' Purgatori (1996);
  - L'Inféran (1997);
  - E' Paradis (2003).
