= Laura Bassi =

Italian physicist and academic (1711–1778)

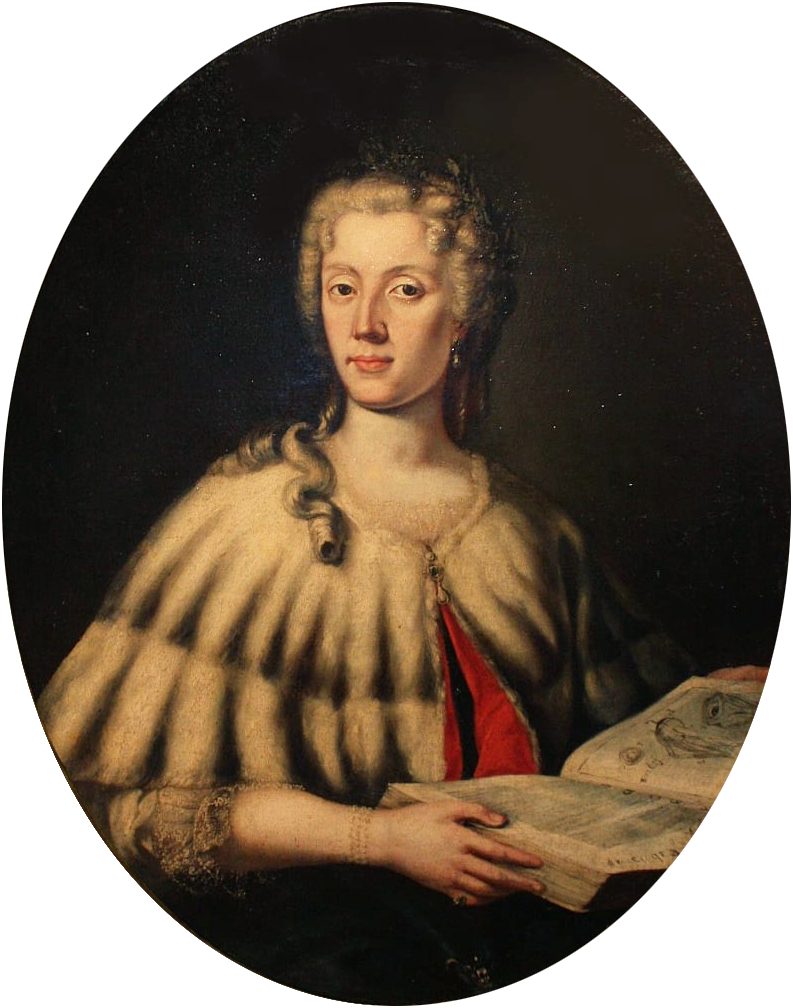
- Painting by Carlo Vandi
- Born: 29 October 1711; Bologna, Papal States
- Died: 20 February 1778 (aged 66); Bologna, Papal States
- Education: University of Bologna
- Known for: First salaried female university professor; populariser of Newtonian mechanics in Italy
- Spouse: Giuseppe Veratti (m. 1738)
- Scientific career
- Fields: Physics; philosophy; mathematics
- Workplaces: University of Bologna
- Patrons: Prospero Lorenzo Lambertini (Pope Benedict XIV)
- Notable students: Lazzaro Spallanzani

Laura Maria Caterina Bassi Veratti (29 October 1711 – 20 February 1778) was an Italian physicist and academic. Recognized and depicted as "Minerva" (goddess of wisdom), she was the first woman to have a doctorate in science, and the second woman in the world to earn the Doctor of Philosophy degree. Working at the University of Bologna, she was the first salaried female teacher in a university. At one time the highest paid employee of the university, by the end of her life Bassi held two other professorships. She was also the first female member of any scientific establishment, when she was elected to the Academy of Sciences of the Institute of Bologna in 1732 at 21.

Bassi did not receive formal education; instead, she was privately tutored from the age of five until she was twenty. By then, she was well-versed in major disciplines, including sciences and mathematics. Noticing her ability, Prospero Lambertini, the Archbishop of Bologna (later Pope Benedict XIV), became her patron. With Lambertini's arrangement, she publicly defended forty-nine theses before professors of the University of Bologna on 17 April 1732, for which she was awarded a doctoral degree on 12 May. A month later, she was appointed by the university as its first female teacher, albeit with the restriction that she was not allowed to teach all-male classes. Lambertini, by then the Pope, helped her to receive permissions for private classes and experiments, which were granted by the university in 1740.

Bassi became the most important populariser of Newtonian mechanics in Italy. She was inducted by the Pope to the Benedettini (similar to modern Pontifical Academy of Sciences) as an additional member in 1745. She took up the Chair of Experimental Physics in 1776, the position she held until her death. She is interred at the Church of Corpus Domini, Bologna.

== Early life ==
Laura Maria Caterina Bassi was born on 29 October 1711 in Bologna, then part of the Papal States. She was the only daughter of Maria Rosa Cesari and Giuseppe Bassi, a lawyer originally from Scandiano in the Duchy of Modena and Reggio. Giuseppe Bassi had recently acquired citizenship in Bologna. Bassi's parents belonged to the city's lower middle class.

== Education ==
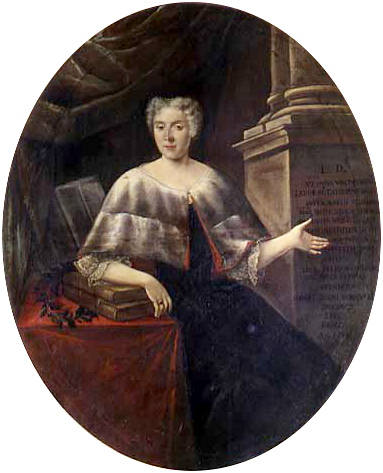
Portrait of Laura Bassi at the University of Bologna

Bassi was educated at home rather than attending a school. From the age of five to thirteen, she studied Latin, French, and arithmetic with her cousin, Father Lorenzo Stegani. She learned to speak and write Latin as well as read it, and later used the language for her university lectures and publications.

From age thirteen to twenty, Bassi studied with Gaetano Tacconi, her family's physician and a professor of medicine at the University of Bologna. Her studies included philosophy, logic, metaphysics, mathematics, mechanics, chemistry, languages, and natural history. Tacconi also trained Bassi in academic debate.

As Bassi's reputation grew, Tacconi introduced her to Bologna's academic circles, where she demonstrated her knowledge in philosophical debates. Among the scholars who became interested in her work was Prospero Lambertini, the archbishop of Bologna and later Pope Benedict XIV. Lambertini became one of Bassi's principal supporters and helped her gain formal recognition from the city and university.

On 20 March 1732, aged twenty, Bassi became the first woman elected to the Academy of Sciences of the Institute of Bologna. Less than a month later, on 17 April, she publicly defended forty-nine philosophical theses in the Sala degli Anziani of Bologna's Palazzo Pubblico. The event drew a large audience that included university scholars and leading political and religious figures.

On 12 May, the university awarded Bassi a doctorate in philosophy. She became the second woman known to earn a doctorate in philosophy, fifty-four years after Venetian scholar Elena Cornaro Piscopia received one in 1678, and the first woman to receive a doctorate in science. She also became an honorary member of the university's College of Philosophers. Her achievements made her famous in Bologna, where she became known as the "Bolognese Minerva", after the Roman goddess of wisdom.

Bassi continued her education after receiving her doctorate. She studied the works of Isaac Newton with Italian scientist Jacopo Bartolomeo Beccari and mathematical analysis with Italian mathematician Gabriele Manfredi.

== Marriage and family ==
On 7 February 1738, Bassi married Giuseppe Veratti, a doctor of medicine and a fellow lecturer in anatomy at the University of Bologna. They shared a sophisticated working relationship; it is argued that through their marriage, Bassi was inspired to begin studying experimental physics. The exact number of their children is not clear, as some reports say it is eight, while others say twelve. Baptismal records held only eight. Caterina (born 1739), Caterina (born 1742), and Flaminio (born 1751) died in infancy. But five survived infancy: Giovanni (1738–1800), who became a canon of San Petronio and professor of theology in the Collegio Montalto; Ciro (1744–1827); Caterina (1745–1768), who became a nun; Giacomo (1749–1818), who became a canon; and Paolo (1753–1831), who became a doctor and professor of experimental physics at the Institute of Science and the only one to produce heirs.

== Career ==
=== Early career ===
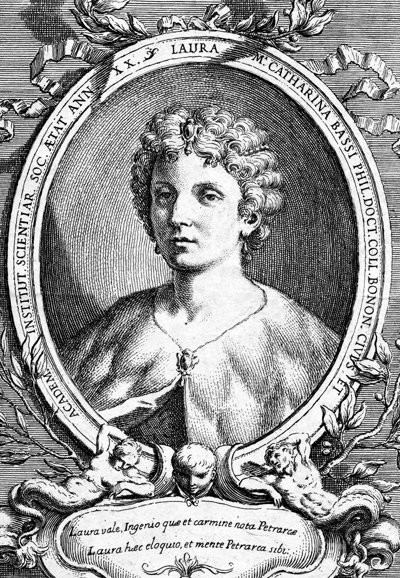
Portrait of Laura Bassi (1732)

On 27 June 1732, about six weeks after receiving her doctorate, Bassi defended twelve additional theses at the Archiginnasio, then the main building of the University of Bologna. The defence formed part of her petition for a university teaching position. Her theses covered chemistry, physics, hydraulics, mathematics, mechanics and technical subjects.

On 29 October, her twenty-first birthday, the university senate approved her candidacy, and in December she was appointed professor of natural philosophy. The position was largely honorary, but made Bassi the first salaried woman lecturer in the world.

Bassi's first university lecture was titled De aqua corpore naturali elemento aliorum corporum parte universi ("Water as a natural element of all other bodies"). Despite her appointment, the university restricted her public teaching because she was a woman and was not permitted to lecture to all-male classes.

Bassi also had a public ceremonial role at the university. Beginning in 1734, two years after her appointment, she attended the annual Carnival Anatomy, a public dissection that was a major event in university and civic life and attracted visitors and prominent members of the community.

In 1739, seven years after her appointment, Bassi sought permission to undertake the same teaching duties as her male colleagues. Her request was supported by Prospero Lambertini and Flaminio Scarselli, secretary to the Bolognese ambassador at the papal court, but was denied.

=== Experimental physics and teaching ===
After her marriage in 1738, Bassi gained greater freedom to teach and conduct experiments in her home. Her principal interest was Newtonian physics, the study of motion, forces and other physical phenomena based on the work of Isaac Newton. She taught the subject for 28 years and became an important figure in introducing Newtonian physics and natural philosophy in Italy.

In 1749, aged 37, Bassi established a private school of experimental physics in her home with the assistance of her husband, physician and university lecturer Giuseppe Veratti. Her courses included Newtonian physics and Franklinian theories of electricity. Bassi taught for eight months each year, giving daily lessons accompanied by experiments. By 1755, she reported that her classes were attracting educated adults, including visitors from outside Italy, rather than primarily younger students. Bassi also developed a laboratory for teaching and research, acquiring scientific instruments at her own expense. In a letter to Flaminio Scarselli, Bologna's representative at the papal court, on 14 June 1755, she described the continuing expense of equipping her courses.

Bassi's home laboratory became a meeting place for students, researchers and visiting scholars from Italy and elsewhere in Europe. She conducted experimental research there, including work on electricity, and other scientists also used the laboratory for experiments. In 1766, aged 54, Bassi received another formal appointment to teach experimental physics at the Collegio Montalto, a residential college in Bologna.

Bassi also collaborated with other scientists on experimental research. In 1769, her former student Lazzaro Spallanzani asked her to repeat experiments investigating whether decapitated snails and leeches could regenerate their heads. He sent Bassi a special microscope for the work, which formed part of his research into regeneration in animals.

In 1772, Paolo Balbi, professor of experimental physics at the Institute of Sciences, died, leaving his chair vacant. Bassi sought the position repeatedly during the following years while the institute debated how to reorganize its experimental physics course. In 1776, aged 65, she was appointed professor of experimental physics at the Institute of Sciences. Veratti, who had previously served as Balbi's assistant, became Bassi's assistant. She held the chair until her death two years later, in 1778.

=== Benedettini ===
In 1745, Pope Benedict XIV established a new class of 24 scholars within the Academy of Sciences of the Institute of Bologna, known as the Benedettini after the pope. Intended to increase the academy's scientific activity, membership carried an annual pension of 100 Bolognese lire and an obligation to present at least one original dissertation each year.

Bassi was not among the 24 scholars initially selected. After learning of her exclusion, she wrote to Flaminio Scarselli, Bologna's representative at the papal court, asking him to approach Benedict XIV on her behalf. Rather than displace one of the existing members, Bassi proposed that she be admitted as an additional member. Despite opposition from some members of the academy, Benedict XIV created a twenty-fifth position for her, making Bassi the only woman among the Benedettini.

Her status as an additional member soon produced another dispute. At a meeting in November 1745, several members argued that Bassi should not be allowed to vote. Bassi, who had not attended the meeting, again appealed through Scarselli, pointing out that she already held voting rights within the Academy of Sciences and in university doctoral proceedings. Benedict XIV ruled in her favour, and two weeks later Bassi thanked Scarselli for resolving the dispute.

From 1746 to 1777, Bassi presented a dissertation annually as part of her responsibilities as a member of the Benedettini. Her research during this period included subjects such as fluid dynamics, electricity and the properties of gases. A nineteenth-century catalogue compiled from the academy's records lists 32 titles of works presented by Bassi during these years. Texts or accounts of only four appear in the academy's published Commentarii.

== Correspondence ==
One of her most important patrons was Cardinal Prospero Lambertini, who encouraged her scientific work. He continually supported the University of Bologna and intervened when other members of the institute tried to segregate Bassi from the rest of the professors.

Only a limited number of her scientific works survive, but her scientific impact is evident through her many correspondents including Voltaire, Cesare Beccaria, Francesco Algarotti, Roger Boscovich, Charles Bonnet, Jean-Antoine Nollet, Paolo Frisi, Lazzaro Spallanzani and Alessandro Volta. Voltaire once wrote to her saying, "There is no Bassi in London, and I would be much happier to be added to your Academy of Bologna than that of the English, even though it has produced a Newton".

Francesco Algarotti, who published his Neutonianismo per le dame ("Newtonism for Ladies") in 1737 wrote several poems regarding her degree ceremonies.

== Death ==
Bassi died on 20 February 1778 at the age of 66. She had deteriorating health attributed to her many pregnancies and childbirth complications. The cause of her death was recorded as attacco di petto (an "attack in the chest", likely heart attack). Her funeral was held at the Church of Corpus Domini, Bologna, where silver laurels were put on her head and she was paid tribute by members of the Benedettina. She was interred in the church in Via Tagliapietre, in front of the tomb of her fellow scientist Luigi Galvani.

== Legacy ==
=== Academic honours ===
Bassi was elected to learned societies across the Italian peninsula throughout her career:

- Academy of Sciences of the Institute of Bologna: first woman member, in 1732.
- Accademia dei Dissonanti in Modena and Università degli Apatisti in Florence, in 1732.
- Accademia degli Arcadi in Rome, in 1737.
- Accademia dei Fluttuanti in Finale Emilia, in 1745.
- Accademia Benedettina: an additional 25th position created for Bassi by Pope Benedict XIV, alongside its 24 regular members, in 1745.
- Accademia degli Ipocondriaci in Reggio Emilia, Accademia degli Ardenti in Bologna, Accademia degli Agiati in Rovereto, Accademia dell'Emonia in Busseto, Accademia degli Erranti in Fermo, Accademia degli Amanti della Botanica in Cortona, Accademia Fulginia in Foligno, and Accademia dei Teopneusti in Correggio, between 1750 and 1763.
- Accademia dei Placidi in Recanati, in 1774.

=== Memorials ===
- A bronze medal engraved by Antonio Lazzari showed a portrait of Bassi on the obverse and an inscription referring to Minerva, the Roman goddess of wisdom, on the reverse, in 1732.
- A marble statue of Bassi was made after her death and placed above the entrance to the Nautical Room of the Institute of Sciences in Bologna.

=== Places, institutions and objects bearing her name ===
- Bassi is a 31 km (19 mi) impact crater on Venus. The International Astronomical Union approved the name in 1991.
- Via Laura Bassi Veratti is a street in Bologna.
- Liceo Laura Bassi is a secondary school in Bologna.
- The Laura Bassi Scholarship provides editorial assistance to postgraduate students and early-career academics researching subjects that have received relatively little attention in their disciplines. It was established in 2018.
- The University of Bologna awards a Laura Bassi Medal as one of its Alumni Awards.
- Laura Bassi is an Italian icebreaking research vessel used for scientific and logistical work in Antarctica by the Italian National Antarctic Research Program since 2019. It is the only Italian research vessel certified to operate in polar waters.

=== Other commemorations ===
- Google marked the anniversary of Bassi's public defence of 49 theses with a Google Doodle, on 17 April 2021.
- American poet Jessy Randall included a poem about Bassi in her collection Mathematics for Ladies: Poems on Women in Science, published in 2022.

== Published works ==
Owing to her administrative duties, family problems and frequent diseases during childbirth, Bassi published only a few works, which reflect a small fraction of her contributions to the University of Bologna. Her scientific works were best summed up in Domenico Piani's treatise Catalogo dei Lavori dell'Antica Accademia, raccolti sotto i singoli autori, published in 1852. Her published works were:

- De acqua corpore naturali elemento aliorum corporum parte universi (Concerning bodies of water as natural elements of other parts of the universe, a collection of theses for university appointment, was published in 1732)
- Four works that appeared in De Bononiensi Scientiarum et Artium Instituto atque Academia Commentarii (Commentaries of the Bologna Institute and the Academy of Arts and Sciences), namely
1. De aeris compressione (Concerning air pressure, 1745)
2. De problemate quodam hydrometrico (Concerning certain problems in hydrometrics, 1757)
3. De problemate quodam mechanico (Concerning certain problems in mechanics, 1757)
4. De immixto fluidis aere (Concerning intermixed gaseous fluid, posthumously published in 1792)

== See also ==
- Isaac Newton
- Luisa de Medrano
- Maria Gaetana Agnesi
- Maria Pellegrina Amoretti
- Maria Skłodowska-Curie
- Sophia Elisabet Brenner
- Timeline of women in science
