= Elena Cornaro Piscopia =

Venetian philosopher (1646–1684)

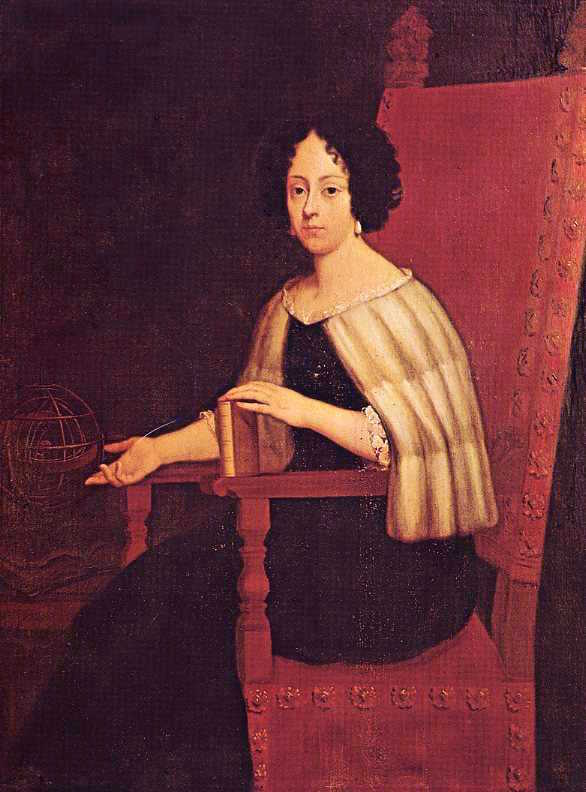
- Born: 5 June 1646; Ca' Loredan, Venice, Republic of Venice (Note: The Republic did not fall until 1797.)
- Died: 26 July 1684 (aged 38); Padua, Republic of Venice (Note: Padua was annexed to the Republic of Venice in 1405 and was a part of the Republic's territories on the mainland until its fall in 1797.)
- Resting place: Church of Santa Giustina
- Known for: One of the first women to receive a degree from a university

Education
- Education: University of Padua
- Academic advisors: Carlo Rinaldini (philosophy); Felice Rotondi (theology)

Elena Lucrezia Cornaro Piscopia (US: /kɔːrˌnɑːroʊ pɪˈskoʊpiə/, Italian: [ˈɛːlena luˈkrɛttsja korˈnaːro piˈskɔːpja]; 5 June 1646 – 26 July 1684) or Elena Lucrezia Corner (Venetian: [koɾˈnɛɾ], Italian: [korˈnɛr]), also known in English as Helen Cornaro, was an Italian philosopher of noble descent in the Republic of Venice who in 1678 became one of the first women to receive an academic degree from a university and the first appointed a Doctor of Philosophy.

== Early life ==
Elena Cornaro Piscopia was born in the Palazzo Loredan, in Venice, Republic of Venice, on 5 June 1646. She was the third child of Gianbattista Cornaro-Piscopia, a member of the Cornaro family; and his mistress Zanetta Boni. Her mother was a commoner and her parents were not married at the time of her birth.

In 1664, Elena's father was chosen to become Over-Procurator of Saint Mark, the treasurer of St Mark's Basilica, a coveted position among Venetian nobility. That made Gianbattista second only to the Doge of Venice in terms of precedence. Because of this connection, Elena was prominent in the Marriage of the Sea ceremony held in the Republic of Venice on the Feast of the Ascension, even though she was born illegitimate. Her father tried to arrange betrothals for her several times, but she rebuffed each man's advances. Early biographers' suggestion that she took a vow of chastity at age 11 is disputed by Francesco Ludovico Maschietto.

In 1665 she took the religious habit of an oblate of the Benedictines, but did not become a nun.

== Education ==
As a young girl Elena was seen as a prodigy. On the advice of Giovanni Fabris, a priest who was a friend of the family, she began a classical education. She studied Latin and Greek under distinguished instructors and became proficient in those languages, as well as French and Spanish, by the age of seven.

Elena came to be an expert musician, mastering the harpsichord, the clavichord, the harp and the violin. Her skills were shown by the music that she composed in her lifetime. In her late teens and early twenties, she became interested in physics, astronomy and linguistics. Carlo Rinaldini, her tutor in philosophy and at that point, the Chairman of Philosophy at the University of Padua, published a book in 1668 written in Latin and centred on geometry. The book was dedicated to a twenty-two-year-old Elena. After the death of her main tutor, Fabris, she became even closer to Rinaldini, who took over her studies.

== Career ==
In 1669 she translated the Colloquy of Christ by Carthusian monk Lanspergius from Spanish into Italian. (Note: Lanspergius' Latin original had been translated into Spanish by Andreu Capella, the Bishop of Urgell.) The translation was dedicated to Gian Paolo Oliva, her close friend and confessor. The volume was issued in five editions in the Republic from 1669 to 1672. She was invited to be a part of many scholarly societies when her fame spread and in 1670 she became president of the Venetian society Accademia dei Pacifici.

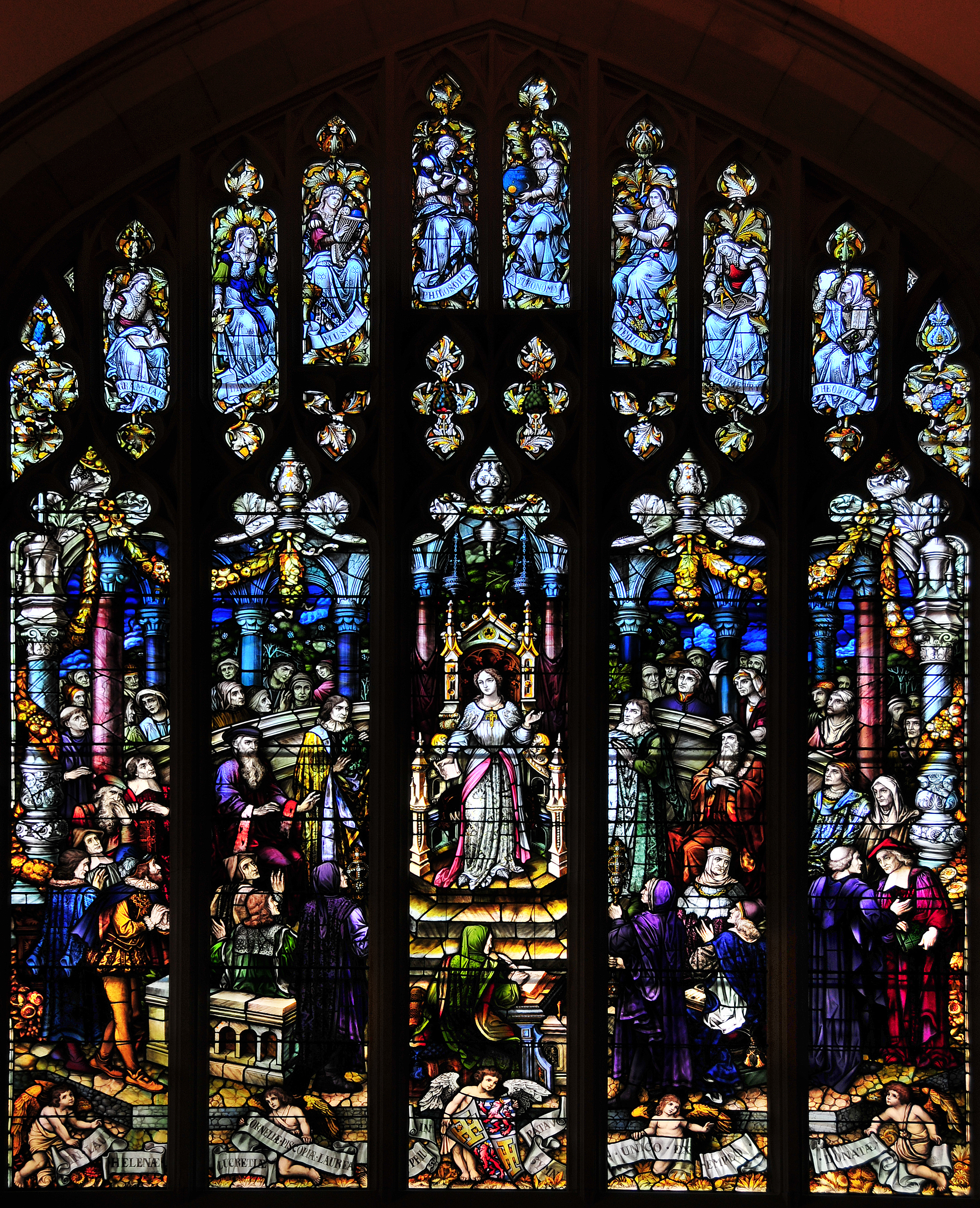
Thompson Memorial Library's window depicting Cornaro's conferral.

On the recommendation of Carlo Rinaldini, her tutor in philosophy, Felice Rotondi petitioned the University of Padua to grant Cornaro the laurea (Note: At the time the laurea was the only degree awarded by Italian universities.) in theology. When Cardinal Gregorio Barbarigo, the bishop of Padua, learned that she was pursuing a degree in theology, he refused on the grounds that she was a woman. However he did allow her to study for a degree in philosophy and after a course of study she received the laurea in Philosophy. The degree was conferred on 25 June 1678 in Padua Cathedral in the presence of the university authorities, the professors of all the faculties, the students and most of the Venetian Senators, together with many guests from the Universities of Bologna, Perugia, Rome and Naples. Elena spoke for an hour in Classical Latin, explaining difficult passages selected at random from the works of Aristotle: one from the Posterior Analytics and the other from the Physics. She was listened to with great attention and when she had finished she received plaudits as Professor Rinaldini proceeded to award her the insignia of the laurea: a book of philosophy, a laurel wreath on her head, a ring on her finger and over her shoulders an ermine mozzetta. She was proclaimed Magistra et Doctrix Philosophiae [teacher and doctor of philosophy], thus becoming one of the first women to receive an academic degree from a university. (Note: Constance Calenda (fl. 1415) may have received a medical degree from the University of Naples. Juliana Morell "defended theses" in 1606 or 1607, although claims that she received a doctorate in canon law in 1608 have been discredited. The putative 13th-century instance of Bittizia Gozzadini at the University of Bologna is discounted by Holt N. Parker.)

The last seven years of her life were devoted to study and charity. She died in Padua in 1684 of tuberculosis and was buried in the church of Santa Giustina.

== Legacy ==
A few months after Elena's conferral, Charles Patin, lecturer in medicine at Padua, applied for his daughter Gabrielle-Charlotte [Carla Gabriella] Patin to begin a degree. The university, supported by Gianbattista Cornaro-Piscopia, changed its statutes to prohibit women from graduating. The next female doctorate was granted by the University of Bologna in 1732 to Laura Bassi.

Cornaro's death was marked by memorial services in Venice, Padua, Siena and Rome. The Accademia degli Infecondi published two memorial volumes of tributes by members: one to mark her degree, and the other her death. Padua's Accademia dei Ricovrati also produced a volume at her death.

In 1895 Abbess Mathilda Pynsent of the English Benedictine Nuns in Rome had Cornaro's tomb opened, the remains placed in a new casket, and a suitable tablet inscribed to her memory. Her graduation ceremony is depicted in the Cornaro Window, installed in 1906 in the West Wing of the Thompson Memorial Library at Vassar College. At the suggestion of Ruth Crawford Mitchell, Cornaro is depicted in Giovanni Romagnoli's 1949 mural in the Italian Nationality Room at the University of Pittsburgh. On 5 June 2019, Google celebrated her 373rd birthday with a Google Doodle. (Note: Doodle was shown in Italy, Greece, Hungary, Czechia, Slovakia, UK, Iceland, Russia, Israel, India, Vietnam, Taiwan, Australia, New Zealand, Canada, the United States, Mexico, Peru, and Argentina.)

Earlier biographies of Elena Cornaro include Massimiliano Dezza's Vita di Helena Lucretia Cornara Piscopia (Venice: Bosio, 1686) and Antonio Lupis' L'eroina veneta (Venice: Curti, 1689). Her collected works, with a biography, were published four years after her death by Benedetto Bacchini.

In 2022, the Italian authorities refused to add her statue to the 78 statues of famous male scientists in Prato della Valle in Padua, arguing that a statue of the scientist already exists elsewhere on the university campus. In 2024, the Padua municipality organized a poll for a new female statue, which was won by Elena Cornaro Piscopia with 47.98% of the votes. The statue will be placed in a very central spot in the city.

In 2026, the Municipality of Padua issued a call for tenders for the creation of the statue. The location is the historic centre of the city. The fee established for the creation of the work is €65,000.

The Piscopia Initiative, named after Cornaro, was founded in Edinburgh in 2019 to tackle the participation crisis of women and non-binary people in mathematics research in the United Kingdom. The Piscopia Initiative encourages women and non-binary students to pursue a PhD in mathematics. As of 2023, it has local committees at 19 UK universities and 250 members ranking from undergraduates to Professors.

== Bibliography ==
=== Works ===
Her writings include academic discourses, translations and devotional treatises.

Collected

- Bacchini, Benedetto, ed. (1688). Helenae Lucretiae Corneliae Piscopiae opera quae quidem haberi potuerunt (in Italian and Latin). Parma: Rosati – via Google Books.

Previously published

- Lettera overo colloquio di Christo N. R. all'anima devota composta dal R. P. D. Giovanni Laspergio in lingua spagnola e portata nell'italiana. Venice: Giuliani. 1669. (reprinted in Bacchini ed. 1688 pp. 179–183)

Unpublished

- A 1672 discourse on Our Lady of Sorrows

=== Biographies ===
- Deza, Massimiliano (1686). Vita di Helena Lucretia Cornara Piscopia descritta da Massimiliano Deza della Congregazione della Santissima Madre di Dio, e dedicata alla maestà dell'aug.ma imperatrice Eleonora principessa di Monferrato, &c (in Italian). Venice: Antonio Bosio.
- Benedetto Bacchini (1688) Actorem Helenæ (in Latin; Bacchini ed. 1688 pp. 1–48)
- Lupis, Antonio; Vendramina, Caterina (1689). L'eroina Venetia, ouero, La vita di Elena Lucretia Cornara Piscopia (in Italian). Venice: Curti. OCLC 991386840.
- Pynsent, Mathilde (1896). The Life of Helen Lucretia Cornaro Piscopia, Oblate of the Order of St. Benedict and Doctor in the University of Padua. St. Benedict's.
- Fusco, Nicola (1975). Elena Lucrezia Cornaro Piscopia, 1646–1684. United States Committee for the Elena Lucrezia Cornaro Piscopia Tercentenary.
- Maschietto, Francesco Ludovico (1978). Elena Lucrezia Cornaro Piscopia, 1646–1684: prima donna laureata nel mondo. Contributi alla storia dell'Università di Padova (in Italian). Vol. 10. Padua: Antenore.
  - Maschietto, Francesco Ludovico (2007). Marshal, Catherine (ed.). Elena Lucrezia Cornaro Piscopia (1646–1684): The First Woman in the World to Earn a University Degree. Translated by Vairo, Jan; Crochetiere, William. Saint Joseph's University Press. ISBN 978-0916101572.
- Tonzig, Maria Ildegarde (1980). Elena Lucrezia Cornaro Piscopia: prima donna laureata nel mondo. Terzo centenario del dottorato (1678–1978) (in Italian). V. Gualandi.
- Guernsey, Jane Howard (1999). The Lady Cornaro: Pride and Prodigy of Venice. College Avenue Press. ISBN 978-1883551445.
- Carrano, Patrizia (2001). Illuminata. La storia di Elena Lucrezia Cornaro, prima donna laureata nel mondo (in Italian). Mondadori. ISBN 978-8804490906.
- Pighetti, Clelia (2005). Il vuoto e la quiete: scienza e mistica nel '600 : Elena Cornaro e Carlo Rinaldini (in Italian). FrancoAngeli. ISBN 978-8846463333.
