= Tall-stem thermometers =

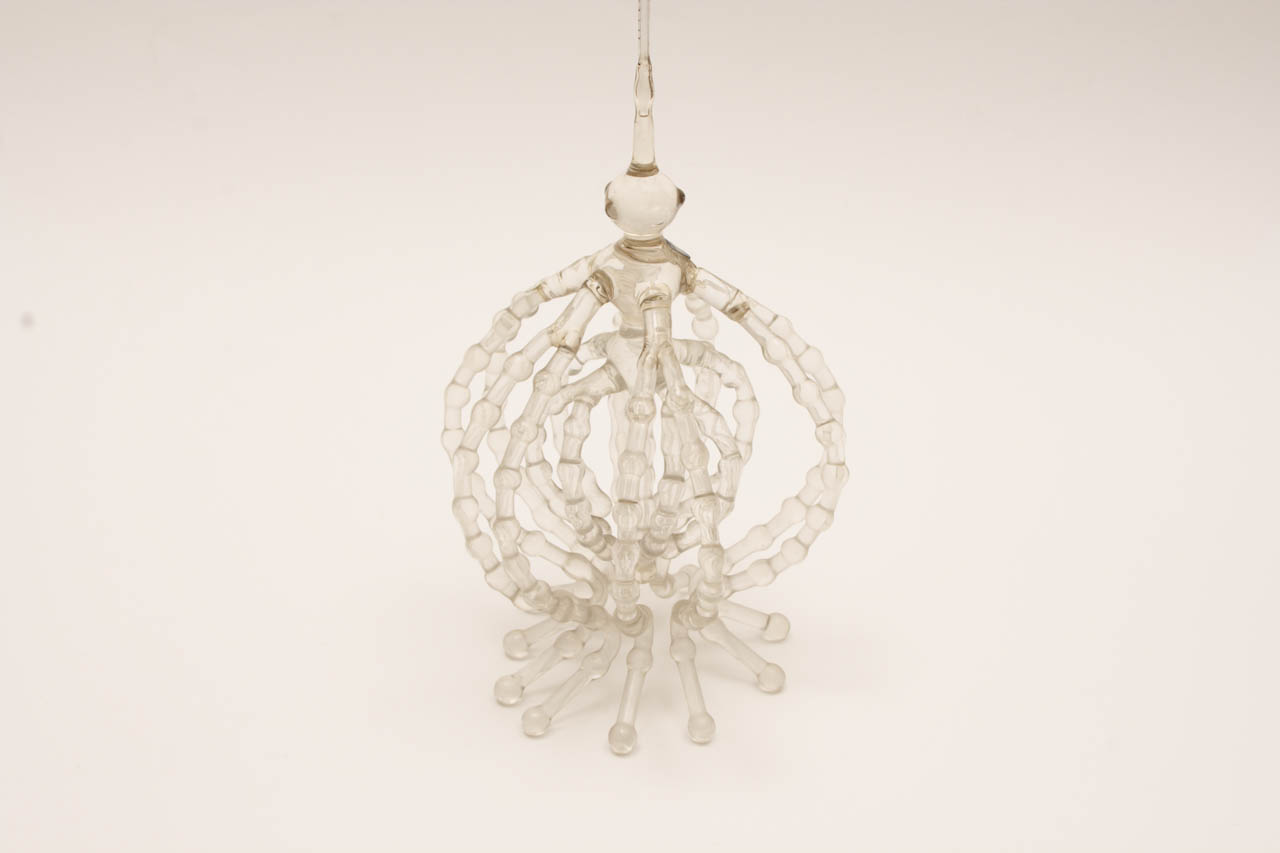
Tall-stem thermometer.

The tall-stem thermometers are a kind of thermometer, resting on branched feet.

The stems carry enamel buttons indicating the degrees of one of the thermometric scales used by the Accademia del Cimento in Florence. The black buttons indicate single degrees, the white buttons ten degrees, and the blue buttons one hundred degrees. The thermometric liquid is acquarzente.

== Bibliography ==
- Mara Miniati, ed. (1991). Museo di storia della scienza: catalogo. Firenze: Giunti. pp. 138, board n. 4–5. ISBN 88-09-20036-5.
- Emilio, Borchi; Renzo Macii (1997). "La nascita del termometro a liquido". Museo Galileo. Firenze: Osservatorio Ximeniano. pp. 41–66.
- Miniati, Mara (2001). Bocciuoli, palle d'oncia e termometri gelosissimi: vetro e scienza nell'Accademia del Cimento. Livorno: Sillabe.
