= List of women who obtained doctoral degrees before 1800 =

Although doctoral degrees appeared in the universities of West Europe in the 12th and 13th centuries, for a long time they were given only to men. Below is a list of the women who obtained doctoral degrees before 1800. The list includes only academic degrees, not Doctors of Divinity.

Constance Calenda (fl. 1415) may have received a medical degree from the University of Naples. Juliana Morell "defended theses" in 1606 or 1607, although claims that she received a doctorate in canon law in 1608 have been discredited. The putative 13th-century instance of Bettisia Gozzadini at the University of Bologna is discounted by Holt N. Parker.

Person	Year	University	Degree
Elena Cornaro Piscopia	1678	University of Padua	Doctor of Philosophy
Laura Bassi	1732	University of Bologna	Doctor of Philosophy
Cristina Roccati	1750	University of Bologna	Doctor of Philosophy
Dorothea Erxleben	1754	University of Halle	Doctor of Medicine
Maria Pellegrina Amoretti	1777	University of Pavia	Doctor of Laws
María Pascuala Caro Sureda	1779	University of Valencia	Doctor of Philosophy
María Isidra de Guzmán y de la Cerda	1785	Complutense University of Madrid	Doctor of Philosophy
Dorothea von Rodde-Schlözer	1787	University of Göttingen	Doctor of Philosophy
Maria Dalle Donne	1799	University of Bologna	Doctor of Medicine

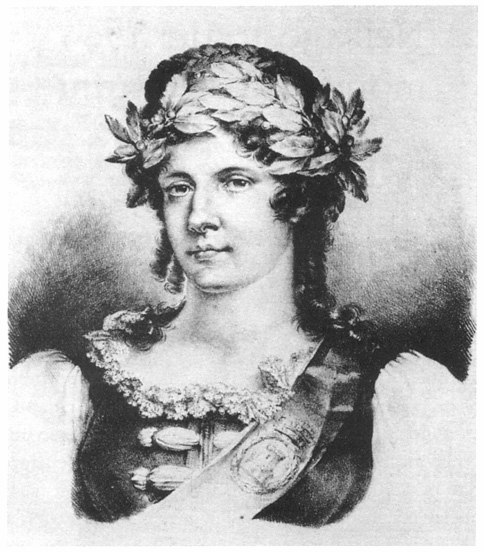
Maria Pellegrina Amoretti, one of the first female doctors of laws

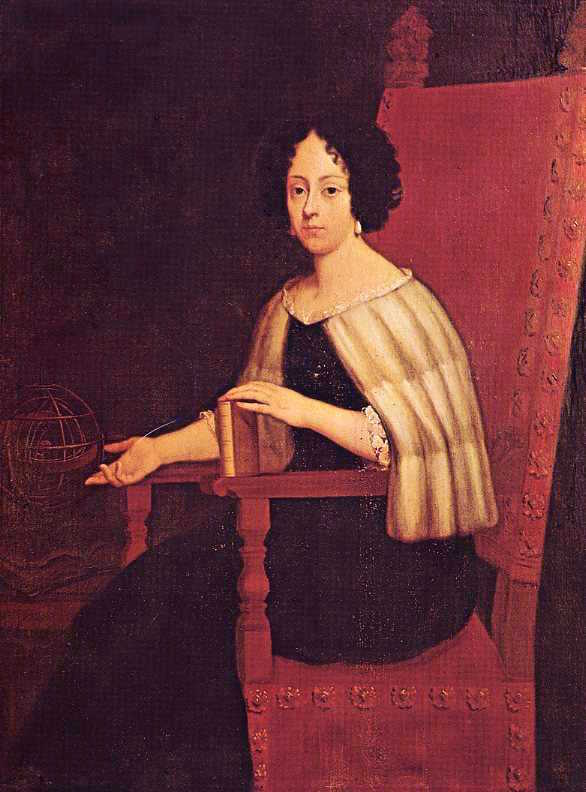
Elena Cornaro Piscopia, the first female doctor of philosophy

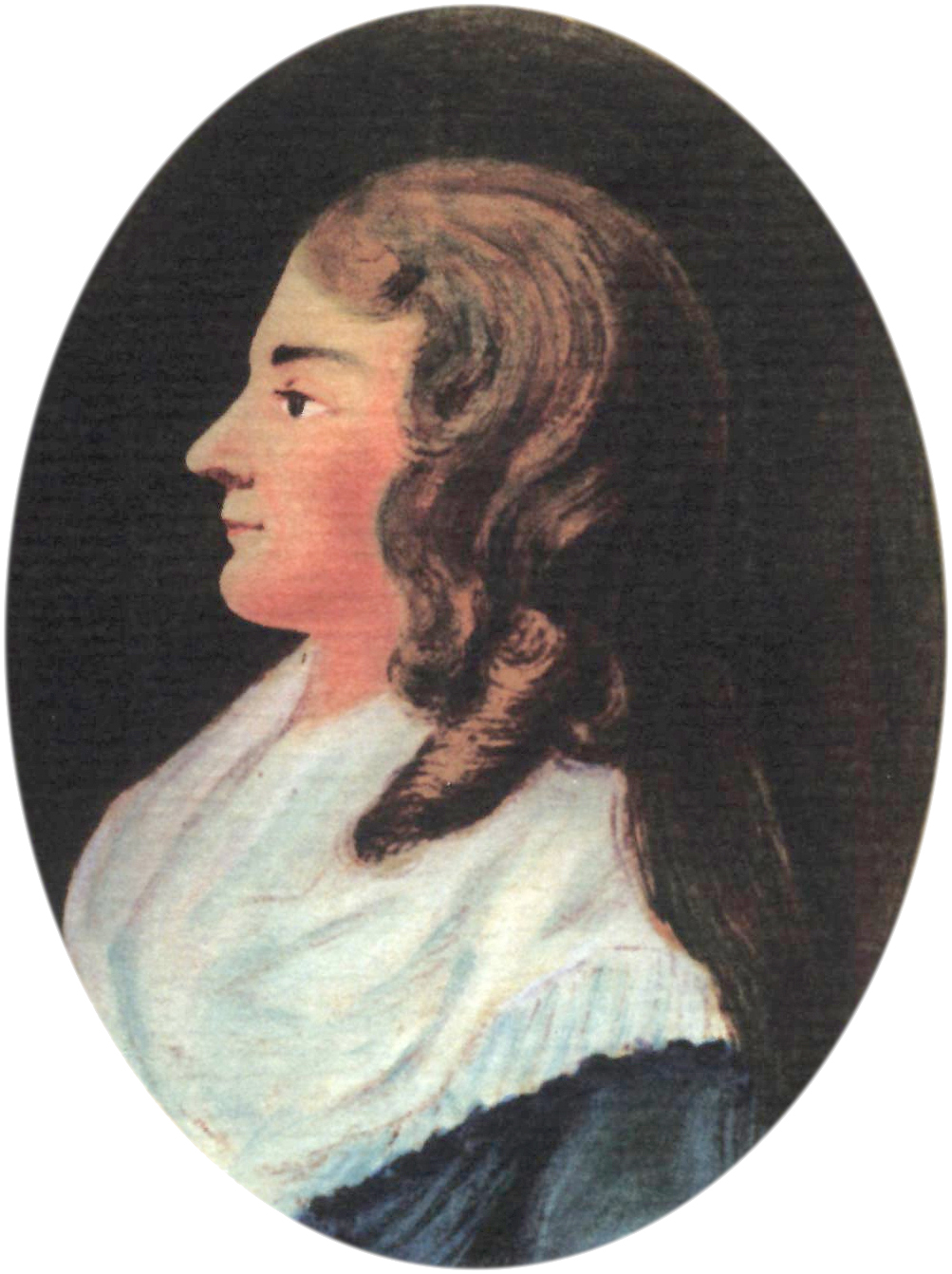
Dorothea Erxleben, one of the first female doctors of medicine

== Literature ==
- Cavazza, Marta (1997), "Minerva e Pigmalione. Carriere femminili nell'Italia del Settecento", The Italianist, 17 (1): 5–17, doi:10.1179/ita.1997.17.1.5 (complete list for 18th century)
