= Franco Gentilini =

Italian painter

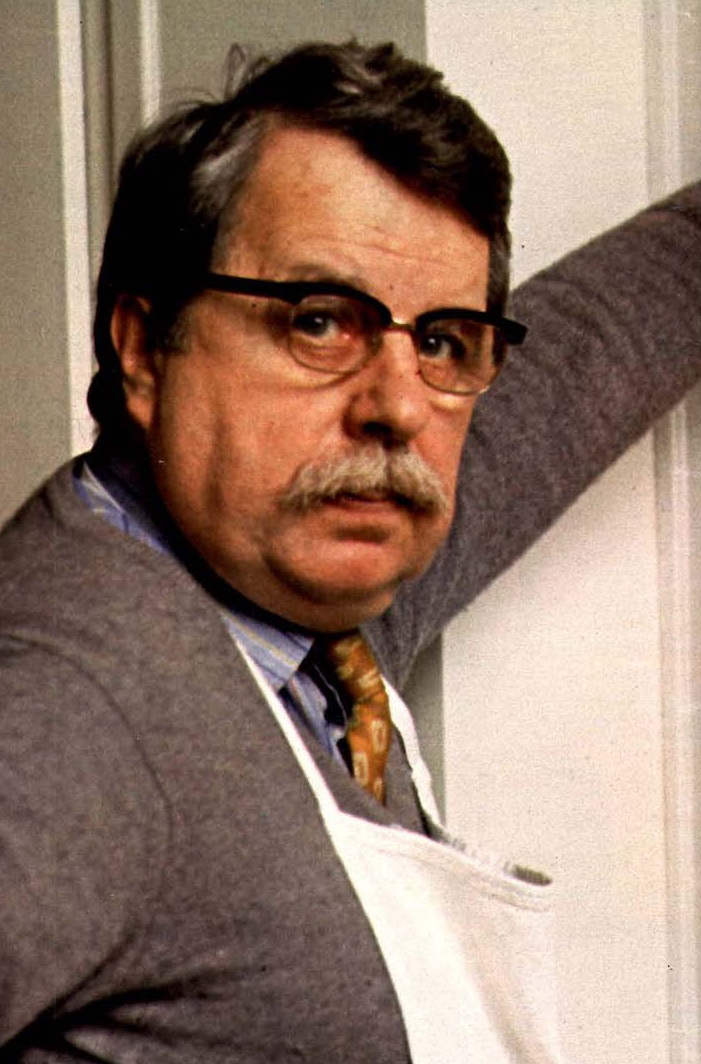
Franco Gentilini in 1973.

Franco Gentilini (4 August 1909 – 5 April 1981) was an Italian painter.

== Biography ==
Franco Gentilini worked as a ceramist in Faenza and collaborated with Giovanni Romagnoli and Giorgio Morandi in Bologna. He took part in numerous editions of the Venice Biennale, beginning with the acceptance of his work for the 17th Esposizione Internazionale d’Arte della Città di Venezia in 1930, when he also visited Paris.

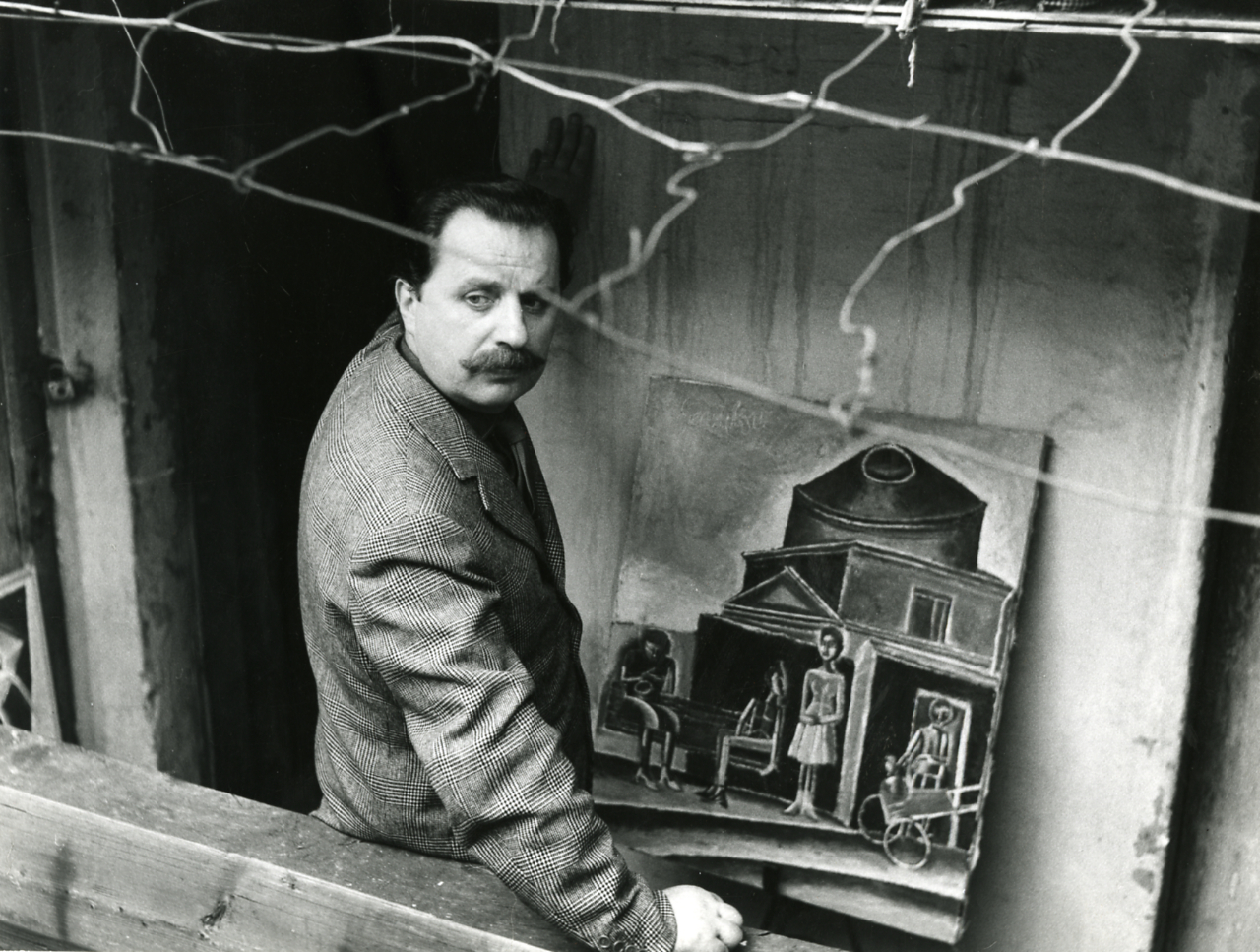
Gentilini in 1965 photographed by Paolo Monti.

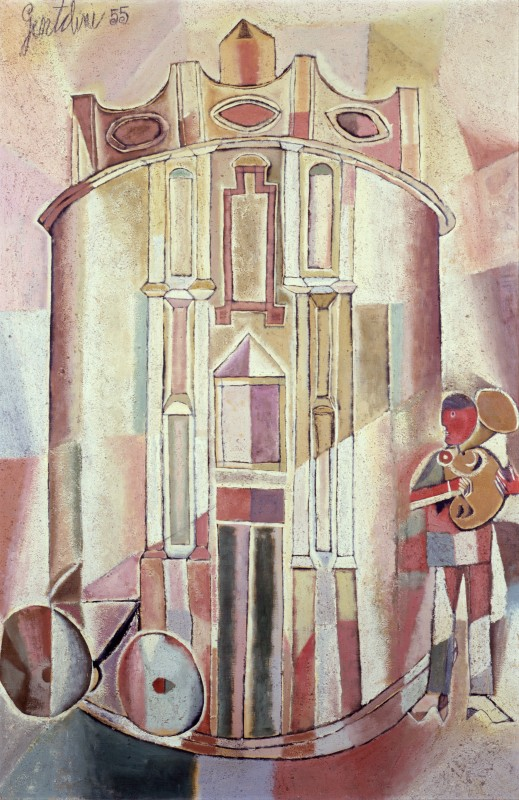
Cattedrale con suonatore di tromba, 1955 (Art collections of Fondazione Cariplo).

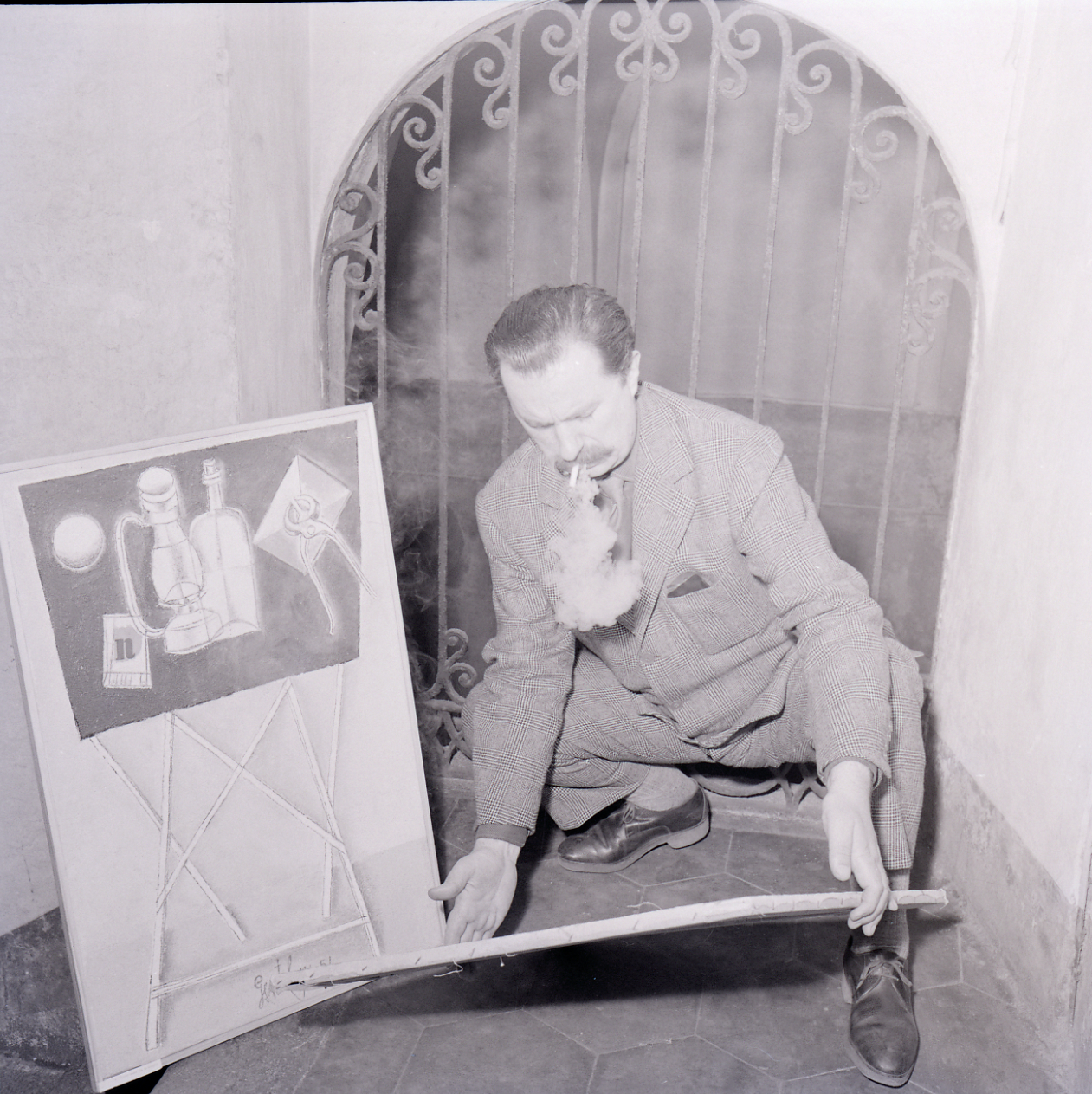
Gentilini photographed by Paolo Monti.

He moved to Rome in 1932 and held his first solo show at the Galleria di Roma with works in an archaic style inspired by pre-Renaissance Italian art. He also established himself as a fresco painter. He took part in the 5th Esposizione Internazionale delle Arti Decorative in Milan in 1933 and the 2nd Quadriennale Nazionale d’Arte in Rome in 1935, on which occasion the city’s governing body bought one of his works. It was in the late 1930s that he began to associate with the artists of the Roman School. There was considerable demand for his work among private Italian collectors after World War II, not least because of his participation in numerous exhibitions.

Works by Franco Gentilini photographed by Paolo Monti

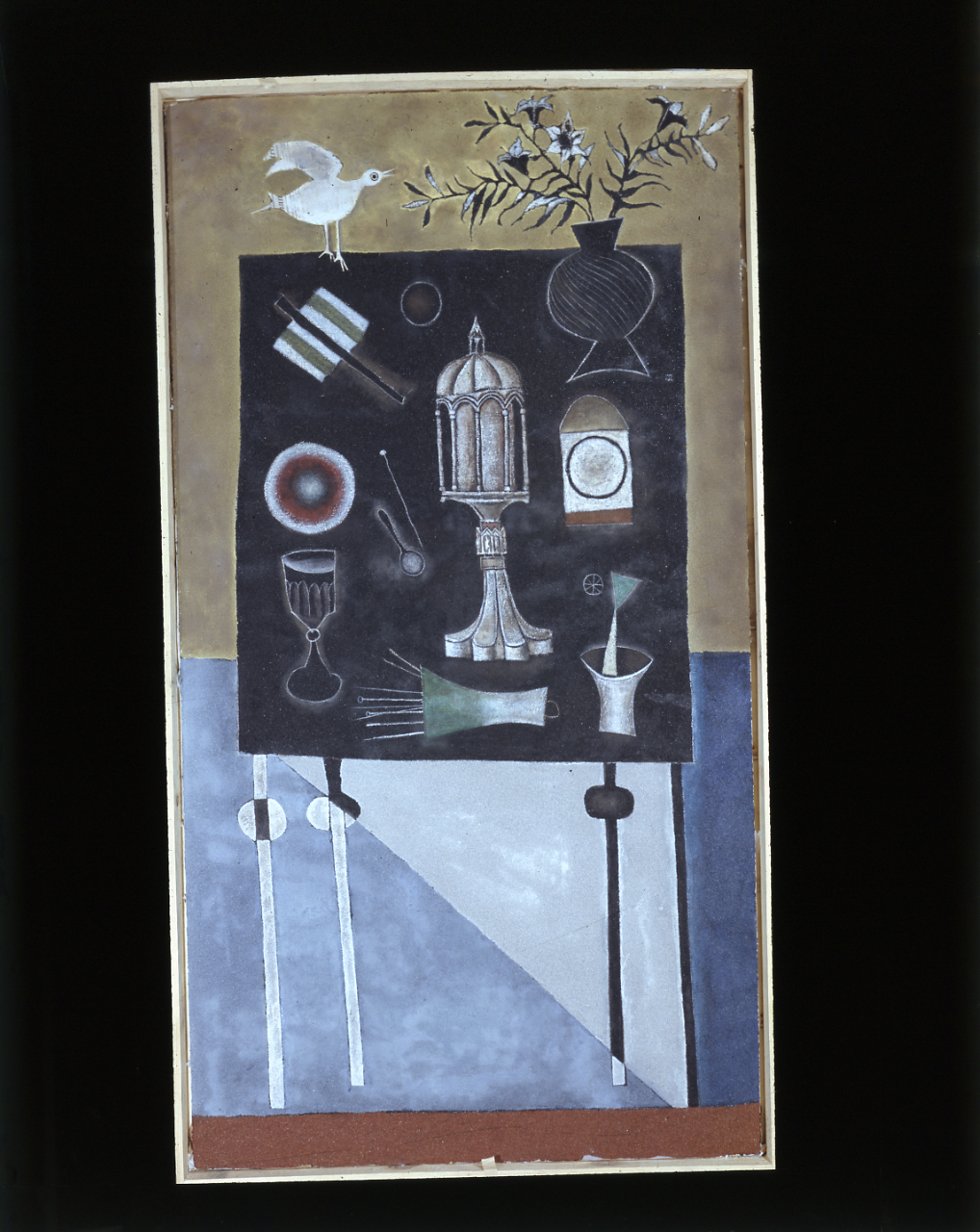

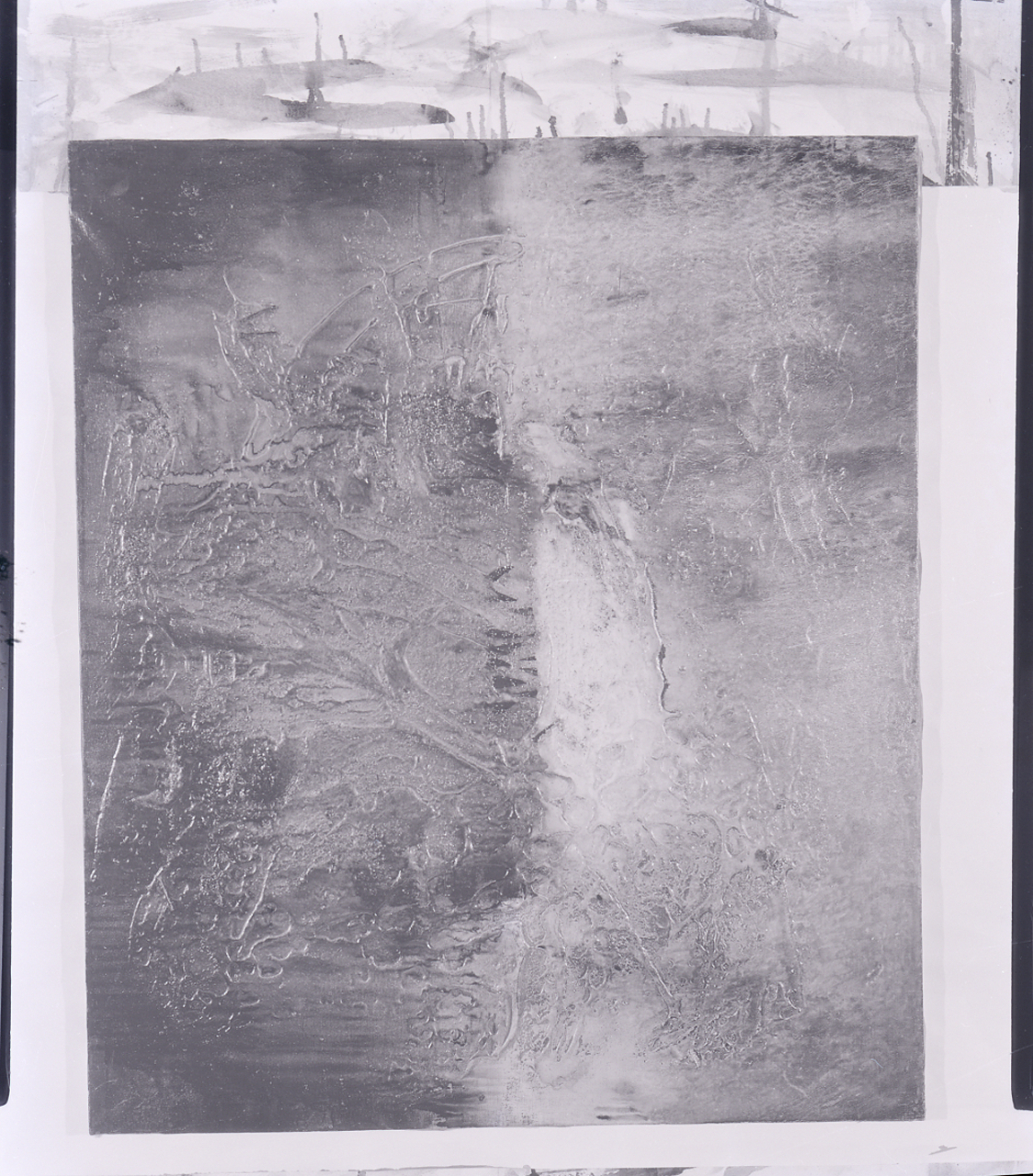

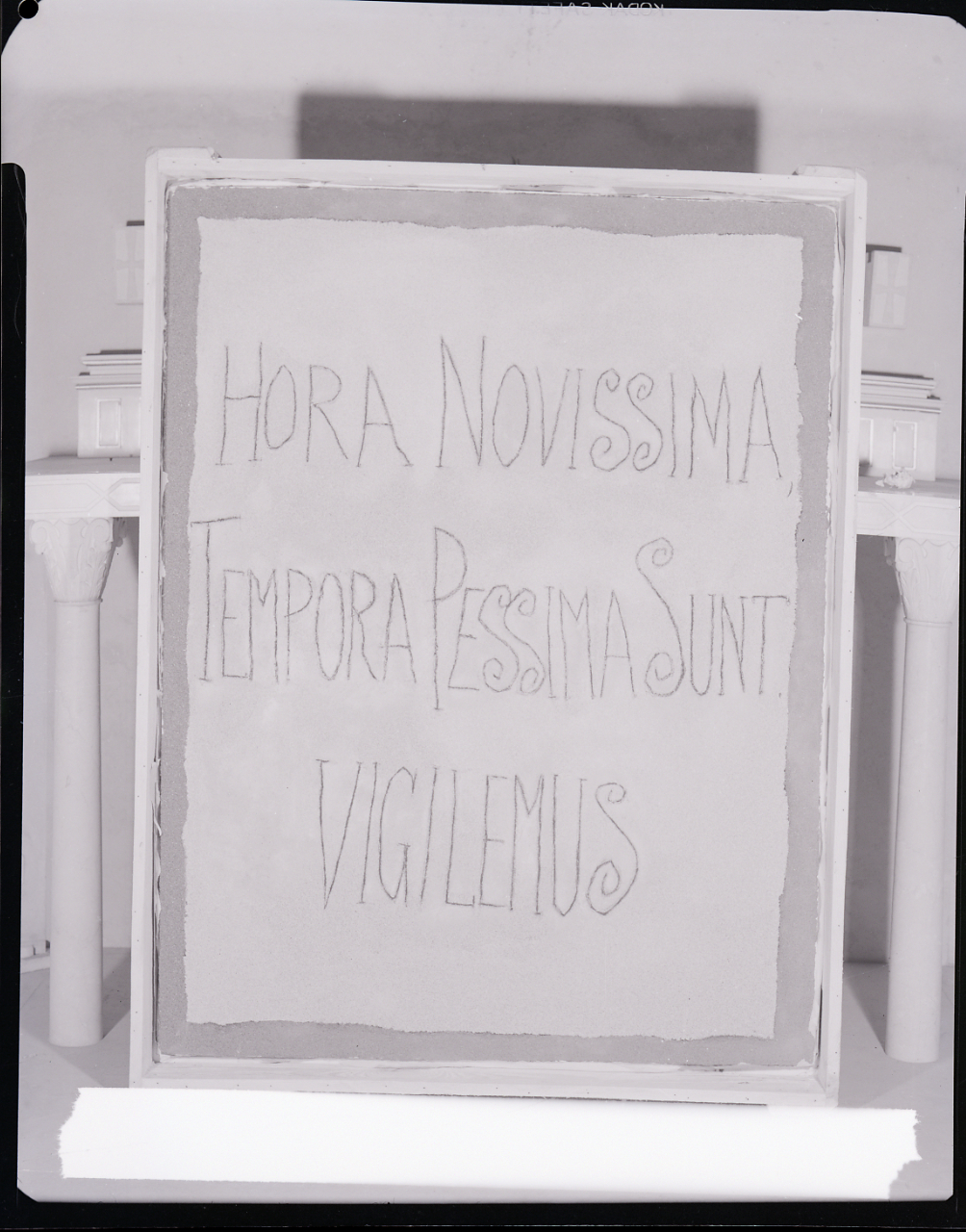

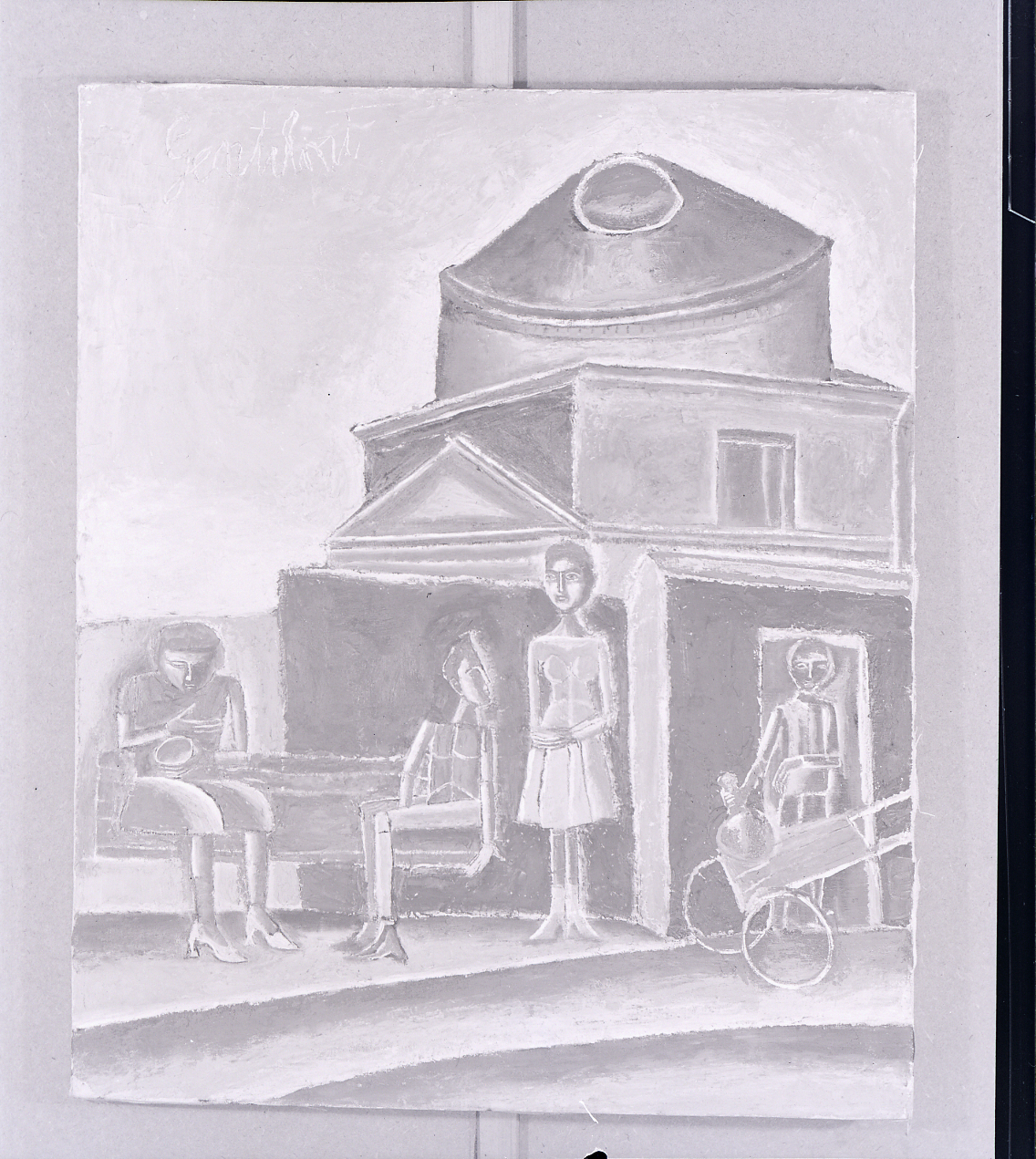

== Other projects ==
Media related to Franco Gentilini at Wikimedia Commons
