= Carlo Rinaldini =

Italian mathematician (1615–1698)

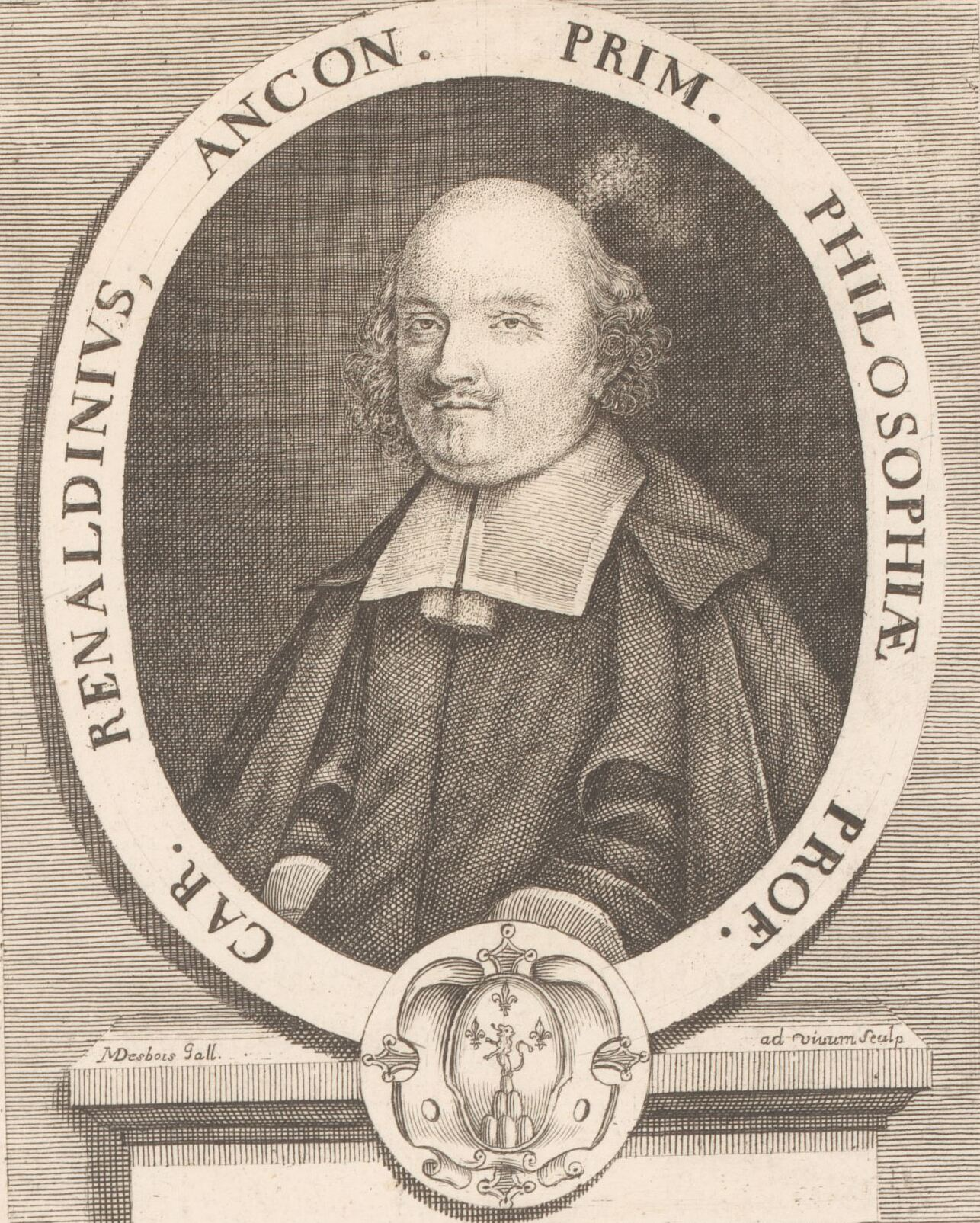
- Engraved portrait of Carlo Renaldini by Martial Desbois
- Born: 30 December 1615; Ancona
- Died: 18 July 1698 (aged 82); Ancona

Academic work
- Discipline: Mathematician; Military engineer; Philosopher; Metrologist

Carlo Rinaldini, or Renaldini (30 December 1615 – 18 July 1698), was an Italian mathematician, military engineer, philosopher, and metrologist from Ancona.

== Biography ==
Born into an aristocratic family originally from Siena, Rinaldini studied at the University of Macerata and the University of Bologna. He was in the service of Pope Urban VIII and obtained the supervision of the fortresses of Ferrara, Bondeno, and Comacchio from Taddeo Barberini, the pope's nephew. He also tutored Barberini's children.

Rinaldini was appointed rector at the University of Pisa, and subsequently a Professor of Mathematics there from 1649 to 1666. Rinaldini was a friend to Galileo and Borelli, who nicknamed him "Simplicio" for his fidelity to traditional Aristotelianism. Rinaldini corresponded with Vincenzo Viviani and with Leopoldo de' Medici. The correspondence with Leopoldo de' Medici helped establish the experimental agenda for the Accademia del Cimento, which was founded in 1657. Rinaldini was an active member of the Accademia.

As part of the Accademia, he proposed an experiment on the diffusion of heat. When a metal ball was frozen in ice, thermometers below the ball had the highest temperature drop; when a metal ball was heated, thermometers above the ball had the highest temperature rise. This disproved the idea that heat and cold propagated in a spherically uniform way, which led physicist and meteorologist W. E. Knowles Middleton to credit Rinaldini with the discovery of convection in air.

Rinaldini had numerous disagreements with his friends and with Francesco Redi and Evangelista Torricelli. Rinadini opposed the theory, advanced by Redi, that insects can be born from parent plant galls. He thus anticipated the hypothesis that gall insects were born from eggs laid by individuals of the same species, promulgated by Malpighi.

In 1667, Rinaldini left Tuscany to go to the University of Padua, where he held the chair of Philosophy and published Philosophia rationalis, atque identità naturalis. He tried in vain to return to Pisa. He then moved to Venice, where he became the teacher of Elena Cornaro Piscopia, who was the first woman in the world to obtain a doctoral degree when Rinaldini declared her to be a Magistra et Doctrix Philosophiae in 1678.

In 1694, Rinaldini was the first person to propose a method for thermometer calibration using the freezing and boiling points of water as fixed references, dividing the scale into equal degrees. Christiaan Huygens originally suggested using freezing and boiling points as standards in 1665, but scientists were unsure whether those standards would hold across different latitudes. Rinaldini argued that the ice and boiling temperatures are universal, and his scale divided the temperature span into 12 degrees. Rinaldini's degrees were calibrated by measuring known mixtures of boiling and freezing water, although that method was subsequently found to be unreliable.

== Selected works ==
- Opus algebricum (in Latin). Ancona: Marco Salvioni. 1644. OCLC 22092376.
- Opus mathematicum (in Latin). Bologna: Evangelista Dozza. 1655. OCLC 165902337.
- Ars analytica mathematum in tres partes distributa (in Latin). Padua: Petri Mariae Frambotti. 1665–1684. OCLC 504104857.
  - Ars analytica mathematum. Pars tertia (in Latin). Padua: Petri Mariae Frambotti. 1684. OCLC 39522456.
- De resolutione atque compositione mathematica libri duo (in Latin). Padua: Pauli Frambotti. 1668. OCLC 780145030.
- Geometra promotus (in Latin). Padua: Petri Mariae Frambotti. 1670. OCLC 4465457.
- Philosophia rationalis, naturalis, atque moralis opus in quo praesertim physica vniuersa ex accursis naturalium effectuum observationibus deducta, & ubi rei natura patitur geometrice demonstrata exhibetur. Tomus primus (in Latin). Padua: Petri Mariae Frambotti. 1681. OCLC 955004293.
- Ad artem quam ipse conscripsit mathematum analyticam paralipomena (in Latin). Padua: Petri Mariae Frambotti. 1682. OCLC 22691008.
- Commercium epistolicum (in Latin). Padua: Petri Mariae Frambotti. 1682. OCLC 78287679.

== Bibliography ==
- Poggendorff, Johann Christian, ed. (1863). "Renaldini (Rinaldini), Carlo". Biographisch-literarisches Handwörterbuch für Mathematik, Astronomie, Physik, Chemie und verwandte Wissenschaftsgebiete zur Geschichte der exacten Wissenschaften, Sächsische Akademie der Wissenschaften zu Leipzig (in German). Vol. 2 (M-Z). Leipzig: J.A. Barth. p. 603.
- Giannini, Giulia (2016). "RINALDINI, Carlo". Dizionario Biografico degli Italiani (in Italian). Vol. 87: Renzi–Robortello. Rome: Istituto dell'Enciclopedia Italiana. ISBN 978-88-12-00032-6.
