= Ludovico David =

Swiss painter

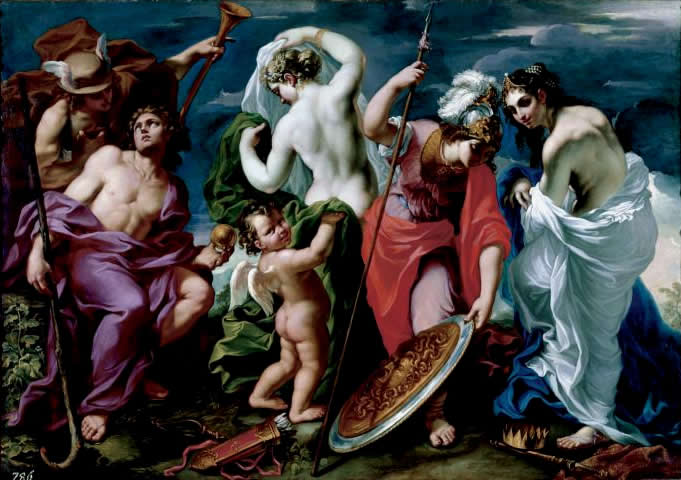
The Judgment of Paris by Lodovico David (1690)

Ludovico Antonio David was born at Lugano in 1648. After studying for some time at Milan, under the Cavaliere Cairo and Ercole Procaccini, he went to Bologna, where he entered the school of Carlo Cignani. He was a painter of some eminence, and gave proof of his ability in the churches and convents of Milan and of Venice. In the church of San Silvestro, in the latter city, is a picture of the Nativity, more resembling the finished style of Camillo than that of Ercole Procaccini. He also painted the portraits of many of the distinguished persons of his time. David designed the frontispiece for the Corriere svaligiato of his great admirer Antonio Lupis.

Lodovico David died after 1709.
