= Antonio Lupis =

Italian writer (1620–1700)

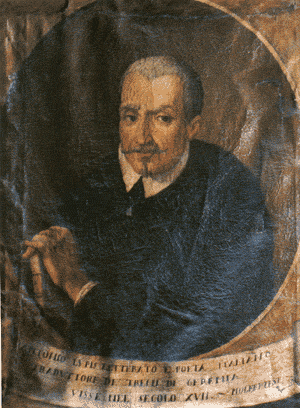
- Portrait of Antonio Lupis
- Born: March 31, 1620; Molfetta, Kingdom of Naples
- Died: 11 December 1700 (aged 80); Bergamo, Republic of Venice
- Resting place: Capuchin Church, Bergamo
- Occupations: Writer; Novelist; Intellectual
- Parent(s): Flaminio Lupis and Maria Lupis (née de Ceglia)
- Writing career
- Language: Italian
- Notable works: La marchesa d'Hunsleij; L'eroina veneta
- Movements: Baroque; Marinism

Antonio Lupis (31 March 1620 – 11 December 1700) was a prolific Italian writer of the Baroque period.

== Biography ==
Antonio Lupis was born in Molfetta on March 31, 1620, son of Flaminio Lupis and his wife Maria de Ceglia, both members of the local nobility. After completing his classical studies at the Episcopal Seminary of his native city, he moved to Venice, where he spent most of his life. He struck up a close friendship with Lorenzo Tiepolo, a powerful Venetian senator, and Giovanni Francesco Loredan, the founder of the Accademia degli Incogniti, of which Lupis became a member. After the death of Loredan, he moved to Bergamo, where he died on 11 December 1700. Lupis was well known in his day for his erudition. His works, dealing chiefly with moral, historical and artistic issues, show a vast amount of classical learning, which he shows off in a sumptuous baroque prose.

== Works ==
Lupis was the author of several successful historical novels. In 1660 he published La Faustina, devoted to the life of the daughter of the Roman Emperor Antoninus Pius. In 1677 he published La Marchesa d'Hunsleij, overo l'Amazone scozzese ("The Marchioness of Huntly, or the Scottish Amazon"), a romanticised hagiographic biography of Lady Margaret Gordon, mother of the Scottish-born Capuchin friar John Forbes (1570/71–1606), that passed through eighteen editions before his death, and was reprinted as late as 1723. Turned into a drama by the poet Francesco Petrobelli, it continued to hold the stage for more than a century.

Some of his works turn upon moral reflections. He wrote a moralizing vita of his friend and patron Giovanni Francesco Loredan and the moral treatises Il Chiaro-scuro di Pittura Morale (1679) and I mostri dell’huomo (1689). Lupis is the author of L'eroina veneta (1689), one of the earliest and most important biographies of Elena Cornaro Piscopia, the first woman to be awarded a higher university degree.

Several of his books, like Il Plico (1675), Il dispaccio di Mercurio (1681), La segretaria morale (1687) and Pallade su le poste (1691), deal with artistic themes and give us interesting information about the painters and sculptors of his time. Of particular interest are a eulogy of his friend, the painter Evaristo Baschenis, written during the artist's lifetime, and the letters sent to the sculptor Andrea Fantoni (1659–1734). A long letter sent to Luca Giordano documents the direct relationship between Lupis and the Neapolitan painter, whose "Passage of the Red Sea" in Santa Maria Maggiore, Bergamo, he describes in a letter dating from 1687. He was a great admirer and friend of the Swiss painter Ludovico David, who designed the frontispiece for Lupis' Corriere (1680).

== Partial anthology ==
- La Faustina di Antonio Lupis, accademico incognito. Venice: Francesco Valuasense. 1660.
- Il postiglione di Antonio Lupis. Venice: Francesco Valvasense. 1662.
- Vita Di Gio. Francesco Loredano Senator Veneto. Venice: Francesco Valuasense. 1663.
- Scene della penna di Antonio Lupis. Accademico incognito. Venice: Valentino Mortali. 1664.
- La valige smarrita di Antonio Lupis accademico incognito. Venice: Abondio Menafoglio. 1666.
- Mastro di casa uniuersal della corte. Sotto titolo di Luigi Fedele consegrato alla serenissima altezza di Isabella Clara di Austria. Venice: Alessandro Zatta. 1666.
- L'Annibale di Antonio Lupis accademico incognito. Bergamo: per li figliuoli di M. Ant. Rossi. 1667.
- Il conte Francesco Martinengo nelle guerre della Prouenza, et altre attioni militari, ... descritte da Antonio Lupis. Bergamo: per li Figliuoli di Marc'Antonio Rossi. 1668.
- Il serafino di Cantalice overo Vita del b. Felice cappuccino di Antonio Lupis. All'eminentiss. e reuerendiss. sig. cardinale Fiderico Borromeo Protettore della medema religione. Massa: Gironimo Marini. 1672.
- Il meriggio della Gratia descritto d'Antonio Lupis. Milan: Francesco Vigone. 1675.
- Fantasme dell'ingegno di Antonio Lupis. Milan: Francesco Vigone. 1675.
- Il plico di Antonio Lupis consegrato all'ill.mo et ecc.mo sig. il sig. Lorenzo Tiepolo. Milan: Francesco Vigone. 1675.
- L'hore pretiose della villa, impiegate nelle memorie più insigni della motta ... Opera composta da Antonio Lupis. Venice: Domenico Milocco. 1677.
- La marchesa d'Hunsleij, ovvero l'amazone scozzese. Venice: Gio. Battista Brigna. 1677.
- Il chiaro-scuro di pittura morale. Venice: per il Brigna. 1679.
- Il corriere di Antonio Lupis. Venice: per il Brigna. 1680.
- Dispaccio di Mercurio spedito da Antonio Lupis, e dal medemo consegrato all'illustrissimo signor Mario Ponzino. Venice: Nicolò Pezzana. 1682.
- Teatro aperto di Antonio Lupis accademico incognito. Venice: G. Tenetti. 1687.
- La Segretaria morale. Venice: Gioseppe Maria Ruinetti. 1687.
- I mostri dell'huomo descritti da Antonio Lupis e dal medesimo consagrati ai felicissimi auspicij dell'illustriss. sig. conte Gio. Battista Vertoua. Venice: Gioseppe Maria Ruinetti. 1689.
- L'eroina veneta, overo La vita di Elena Lucretia Cornara Piscopia. Venice: per il Curti. 1689.
- Il Gerione diuiso in tre capi orationi sagre, eroiche, e funebri composto da Antonio Lupis. Venice: Gioseppe Maria Ruinetti. 1689.
- Pallade su le poste descritta da Antonio Lupis. Gioseppe Maria Ruinetti. 1691.
- Il nuovo zodiaco figurato nei segni della vera sapienza descritto da Antonio Lupis. Venice: Lorenzo Basegio. 1697.
- Le stravaganze della fortuna. Venice: Gioseppe Maria Ruinetti. 1697.
- La curiosità in viaggio. Venice: Gioseppe Maria Ruinetti. 1697.
- L'amazone della fede nella vita della vergine e martire Maria romana. Milan: Francesco Vigone. 1712.

== Sources ==
- Toppi, Niccolò (1678). Biblioteca napoletana, dalle origini per tutto l'anno 1678. Naples: Antonio Bulifon. p. 29.
- Croce, Benedetto (1929). Storia dell'età barocca in Italia. Bari: Laterza. p. 159.
- Cirilli, Fiammetta (2006). "LUPIS, Antonio". Dizionario Biografico degli Italiani (in Italian). Vol. 66: Lorenzetto–Macchetti. Rome: Istituto dell'Enciclopedia Italiana. ISBN 978-88-12-00032-6.
- Villani, Stefano (2008). "Conversione e famiglia in due testi letterari italiani del '600". Studi Storici. 49 (4): 1039–1062. JSTOR 20568100.
- Spera, Lucinda (2012). "Antonio Lupis (sec. XVII): un apprendista tra gli Incogniti di Venezia". Romanica Cracoviensia. 12. doi:10.4467/20843917RC.12.018.0735.
- Spera, Lucinda (2014). Due biografie per il principe degli Incogniti: Edizione e commento della Vita di Giovan Francesco Loredano di Gaudenzio Brunacci (1662) e di Antonio Lupis (1663). Bologna: I libri di Emil. ISBN 9788866800972.
- Pastres, Paolo (2016). "La celebrazione del monumento al doge Pesaro ai Frari in un elogio della scultura di Antonio Lupis (1682)". AFAT. Rivista di Storia dell'arte. 35: 71–88. doi:10.13137/2499-6750/16260.
- Baccanelli, Francesco (2021). "Antonio Lupis (1620-1700) e l'arte bergamasca del suo tempo". Arte Lombarda. 191–192 (1–2). doi:10.26350/666112_000080.
