= Accademia del Cimento =

Academy of sciences

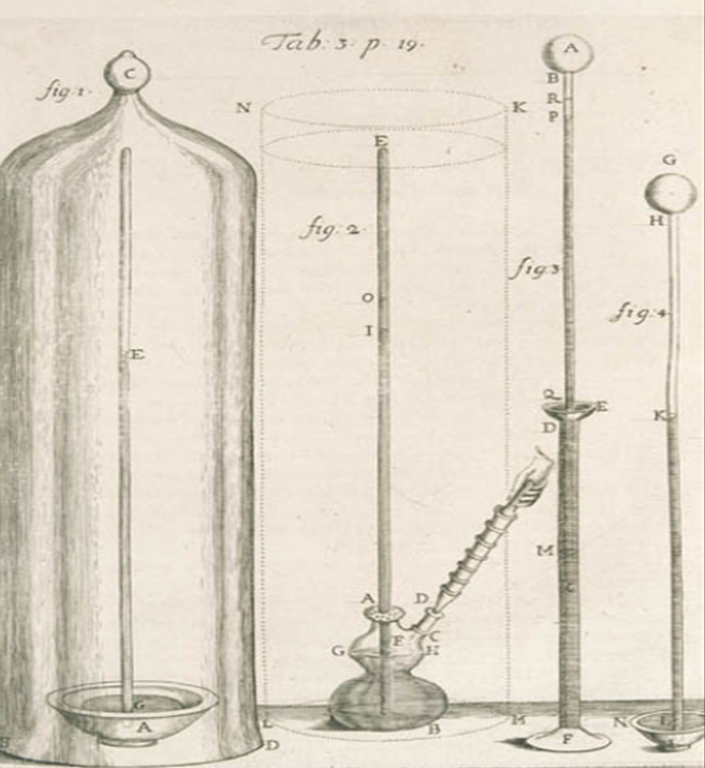

The Accademia del Cimento (Academy of Experiment), an early scientific society, was founded in Florence in 1657 by students of Galileo, Giovanni Alfonso Borelli and Vincenzo Viviani and ceased to exist about a decade later. The foundation of Academy was funded by Prince Leopoldo and Grand Duke Ferdinando II de' Medici. The tenets of the society included:

- Experimentation (about everything, in this early period of science)
- Avoidance of speculation
- Creation of laboratory instruments
- Standards of measurement
- Motto – Provando e riprovando = Proving and proving again (or Trying and Trying again)
- A publication Saggi di naturali esperienze fatte nell'Accademia del Cimento sotto la protezione del Serenissimo Principe Leopoldo di Toscana e descritte dal segretario di essa Accademia first published in 1666, later translated into Latin in 1731. It became the standard laboratory manual in the 18th century.

== Overview ==
The Cimento published a manual of experimentation which began the process of standardizing processes, instruments and measurements throughout Europe. Their motto Provando e riprovando means “proving and disproving”, i.e. providing proofs of true facts and confuting false ones, while a literal translation may read "trying and trying again". Unlike many of the other scientific societies formed in the seventeenth century, such as the Accademia dei Lincei (founded 1603), the Royal Society of London (founded 1660), and the Academie Royale des Sciences (founded 1666), the Accademia del Cimento never established rules to make it a formal body. There were no formal rules for joining the society, there was no established meeting calendar and the society never set up an organizational structure. Instead the society remained a close knit group of virtuosi under the direction of their patrons, Prince Leopold of Tuscany and Ferdinando II de' Medici, Grand Duke of Tuscany, both sons of Cosimo II de’ Medici. The society only published one manuscript during its existence, Saggi di naturali esperienze fatte nell'Academia del Cimento sotto la protezione del Serenissimo Principe Leopoldo di Toscana e descritte dal segretario di essa Accademia and all the works in the manuscript were published anonymously. This means there are very few actual records of the workings of the society. The lack of historical sources was compounded by the fact that although sixteen volumes of writings of the Accademia del Cimento were copied in the early eighteenth century by Giovanni Targioni-Tozzetti, assistant librarian of the Magliabecchi Library, the original manuscripts were lost. The history of the society can only be pieced together through the letters and diaries of the people associated with the operation. The National Library of Florence recently digitized all of these documents and they are available on-line.

== Members ==
- Prince Leopold of Tuscany – considered by many to be the founder of the Academy, Prince Leopold was known for his interest in astronomy. When he was made a Cardinal in 1667 and moved to Rome the Accademia del Cimento ceased to exist.
- Ferdinando II de' Medici, Grand Duke of Tuscany – Ferdinando was an influential patron of Galileo and supporter of learned men. Ferdinando was known within the society for his interest in experiments concerned with what we now call physics.
- Giovanni Alfonso Borelli – Chair of Mathematics at the University of Pisa during the time of the Accademia del Cimento. Borelli is the best known of the members but also known for his intolerance of criticism and quarrelsome disposition. There is speculation his peevish nature caused Leopold’s final dissolution of the Academy. Borelli was also the only member who strenuously objected to merging his work with others of the Academy, and extensively published works under his own name.
- Candido and Paolo del Buono – Not much is known of Candido but Paolo was personally invited by Prince Leopold to become a member of the society. He was a contemporary student of Galileo with Viviani. Was in service to the Polish court during much of the existence of the society.
- Alessandro Marsili – Highly thought of by Galileo who wrote a letter to Prince Leopold in 1640 praising him. This praise seemed to have secured his position as the chair of philosophy at Pisa and membership in the society. He was not liked by the other members because he was a “rotten and mouldy peripatetic” according to Borelli in a letter to Paolo del Buono in 1657. The historian W.E.Knowles Middelton suggests that Marsili was added to the group to act as the simpleton used by Galileo in his work Dialogue Concerning the Two Chief World Systems.
- Francesco Redi – Although letters from Redi to others which state Redi was a member of the Accademia del Cimento there are no corroborating evidence from other members.
- Carlo Rinaldini – First to lecture on works of Galileo as the chair of Philosophy at Padua. Proposed an experiment on the diffusion of heat which gives him claim to be the discoverer of the convection in air.
- Nicolas Steno – A pioneer in anatomy, paleontology, geology and stratigraphy, and crystallography, he made observations and discoveries still recognized today. Brought up as a Lutheran, he converted to Catholicism and later became a bishop.
- Antonio Uliva – Libertine who was totally undisciplined and no records exist of any input into the experiments of the society exist. Was arrested for scandalous conduct in Rome in 1667 and threw himself out a window and died.
- Vincenzo Viviani – Famous scholar, and student of Galileo. He was offered positions by Louis XIV, King of France, and John II Casimir of Poland. He took the position of court mathematician offered by Duke Fedinando. Viviani had a reputation for being slow on completing his work. Borelli and Viviani were considered to be the most brilliant of the members of the society, but they could not get along.
- Secretary (1657–1660) – Alessandro Segni – Made no ascertainable contribution to the Academy but as Prince Cardinal’s Superintendent of his secretariat, became the owner of the Academy’s papers. His heirs are responsible for the loss of the originals.
- Secretary (1660–1667) Lorenzo Magalotti – Main author of the only publication of the Academy, the Saggi. Known for his meticulous attention to detail and his growing disinterest in the work of the Academy, both of which contributed to the 5 year process it took to publish the work.

== Founding ==
Since the workings of the Academy were not formalized there can be no clear cut answer to the exact date of the founding of the Cimento suggests that the Cimento was the formal organization of meetings held by Prince Leopold in his study, and that the society did not exist, except when Leopold was present. Middleton agrees that the overall emphasis was on what Leopold and Ferdinand wanted to study but makes the case that the society performed experiments according to each individuals curiosity. Nevertheless they both agree with The Istituto e Museo di Storia della Scienza in Florence which gives the starting date of 1657.

== Publication ==
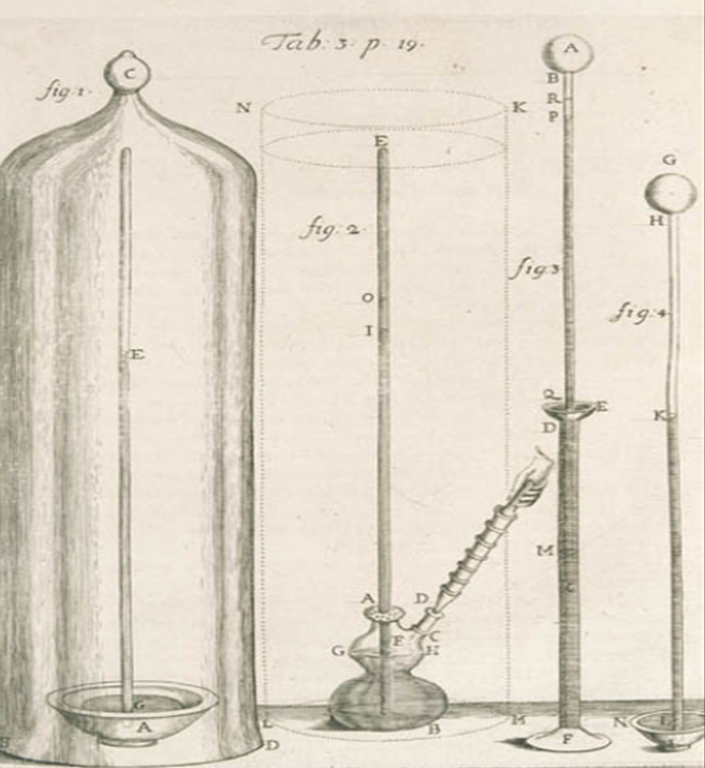
Instruments shown in the Saggi

The main publication of the Cimento is the Saggi di naturali esperienze fatte nell'Academia del Cimento sotto la protezione del Serenissimo Principe Leopoldo di Toscan e descrittedal segretario di essa Accademia usually referred to as the Saggi. This document has been called the laboratory manual of the eighteenth century. The manual was published anonymously and took over 6 years to write. Most of the experiments discussed in the Saggi were completed within the first two years of the Cimento and the rest of the time the book went through revisions. These revisions were caused by Magalotti’s perfectionism, his growing uninterestedness with the experiments themselves, further compounded by the fact the book was being written by a committee. Recent studies show the adverse impact of the patronage culture and Prince Leopold's desire to be known as a patron of the "new science" on the publication of the document. Other studies show the influence the trial of Galileo had on Prince Leopoldo. He wrote Magalotti and informed him that the manuscript be sent to Cardinal Ranucci and that "nothing will be printed against his wishes." Leopoldo even sent parts of the manual to the Pope for approval. Boschiero argues that leaving out all astronomical experiments and not advancing theories of why things happened in nature, just recording what happened when nature is observed was driven by Leopoldo's concern with offending the church.

The first part of the Saggi discussed the highly accurate instruments the Cimento used to perform their experiments. Measurement of physical phenomenon was a new area and this section of the manual laid out what and how physical properties were to be measured for a variety of disciplines, to include heat (thermometer), humidity (hygrometer), time (pendulum) etc.

The first set of experiments relates to determining air pressure with mercury barometers. The second set reviewed work done by Robert Boyle on variant air pressure and vacuums. The third set discussed artificial cooling and the fourth set discussed natural cooling. The fifth set looked at the effect of heat and cold on various objects. The sixth set investigated the compressibility of water while the seventh series put a nail in Aristotle’s idea of the natural state of fire by proving that smoke does not rise in a vacuum. The eighth set discussed magnetism and the ninth discussed amber. The tenth set looked at color while the eleventh investigated the speed of sound. The twelfth set demonstrated falling body laws Galileo discussed but did not perform experiments to prove.

The Saggi is replete with pictures of laboratory instruments and how-to instructions on the use of the instruments. A modern translation of the manual is provided in Middelton’s book, The Experimenters: A Study of the Accademia del Cimento

== Demise of the Accademia del Cimento ==
The Cimento never became an institution. It was always dependent upon the rules and orders of its patrons, Leopold and Fernando. Although it has been said that the Pope made the dissolution of the Cimento a prerequisite to Leopold becoming a cardinal, this has not been proven. Instead, it seems as if the main members of the society performed the experiments that most interested them with the best instruments currently available from the patrons and then all moved to different pursuits. Borelli, in particular, seemed to tire of having to share his accolades with others and grew tired of the cooperative effort that did not allow for individual recognition. The Cimento did not disband as much as it just fizzled out.

== The Societies' Place in the Scientific Revolution ==
=== Experimentation ===
The Accademia del Cimento existed during the period of European history when, arguably, the foundations of modern science were established; a period sometimes referred to as the Scientific Revolution. Using ancient authority and divine revelation as the ultimate source of knowledge was replaced by a belief that knowledge of nature could only be obtained through detailed observations or artificial experiments. If one read the Saggi alone, it would seem that this new experimental science underlay the Cimento's every activity. The Saggi epitomized the new way of doing science, concentrating on the experiments themselves, with little or no analysis or explanations of the results of the experiments. Recent studies have cast doubt about society member's acceptance of this new method for acquiring knowledge and determining truth.

The intellectual elite of the early modern period functioned within a prestige-conscious society. At the top of the intellectual hierarchy were the philosophers; the people who used their ability to think and reason to determine how the world works. The prestigious chairs at universities were allocated to philosophy and theology, people who thought not mathematicians. Francis Bacon’s utopia world, described in his book New Atlantis described the natural philosophers quest as determining “...the knowledge of causes, and secret motions of things; and the enlarging of the bounds of human empire, to the effecting of all things possible. described a society ruled by nine levels of knowledge creators, and at the very top of the organization were the Interpreters of Nature, who raised the “discoveries by experiments into greater observations, axioms, and aphorisms.”

Italian society of the seventeenth century was governed through a culture of patronage. In the book Galileo, Courtier, Mario Biagioli argues that many of Galileo's actions, the most famous Italian scientist of the time, were dictated by the patronage system. This patronage system also influenced the actions and output of the Cimento. The Medici family had long been a supporter of arts and culture within Florentine society and wanted to use the Cimento to project their power and prestige throughout Europe. The members of the society knew this and envisioned the publication of the Saggi would "return the applause that is merited by the talent and dilligence of thies gentleman [the accadmeician], and first of all by the manganimity of Your Highness.[sic?]" This prestige could only come about if the society was seen as being at the forefront of the "new" science, which meant emphasis on experiments and not causes.

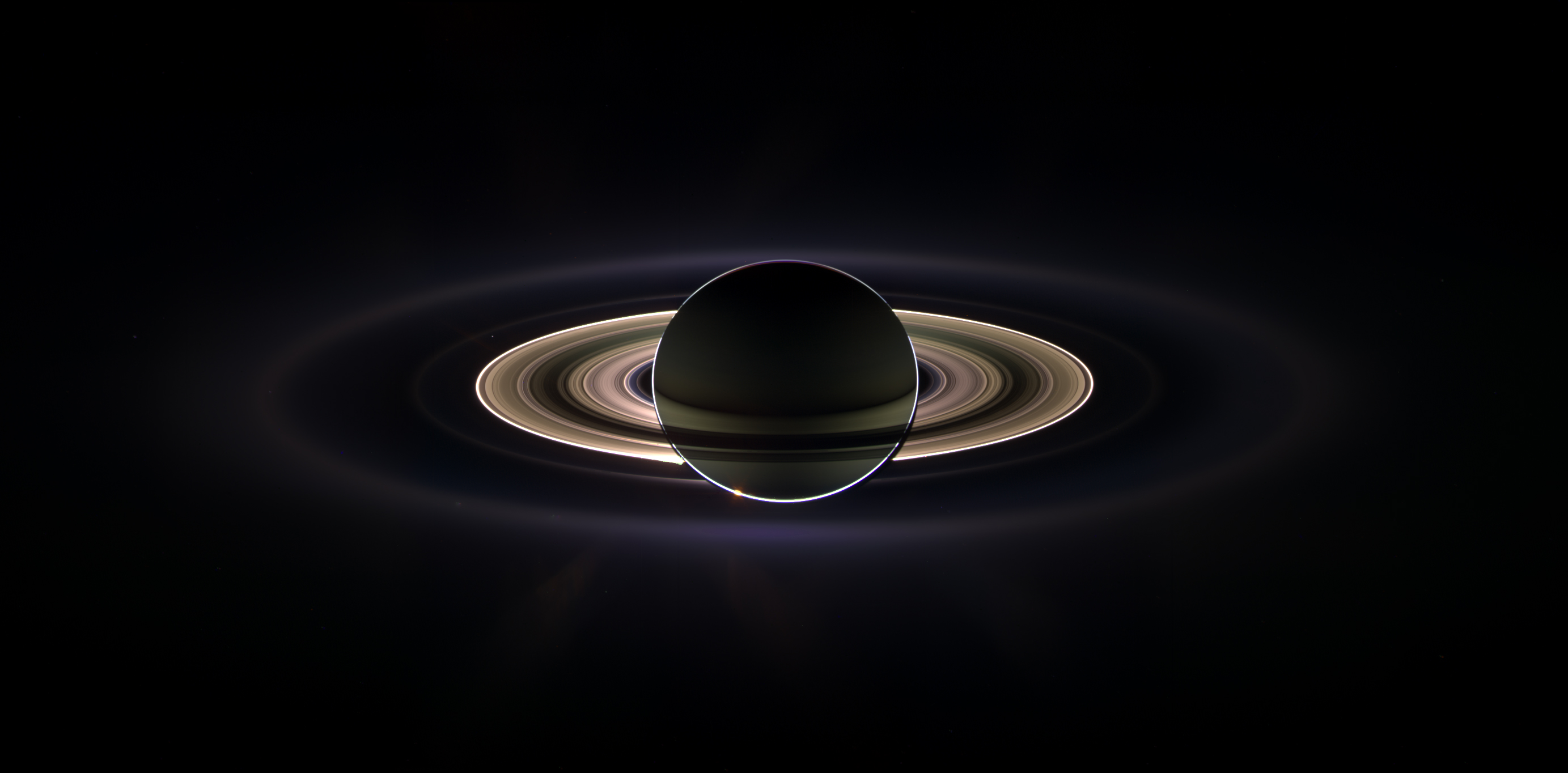
Saturn Rings: Focus of the Cimento, but never published

Giorgio Strano argues that the members of the Cimento, especially Galileo’s students, continued to use a deductive approach using ancient texts to drive their selection of experiments and how the experiments were conducted. In a debate about Galileo’s discovery of the Rings of Saturn these members developed an experiment which would demonstrate that Galileo’s discovery was validated by Christiaan Huygens theory. Not only was this experiment never published but all references to the members being motivated by a desire to determine the causes of nature were stricken from published works. The patron’s desire to gain stature in society overshadowed the members desire to be thought of as Philosophers of Natural History. Thus, the patronage system the Cimento worked under created the myth that the Cimento was exclusively concerned with experimentation, when reality paints a different picture. It was only when the Cimento decided to publish their work to their European colleagues, that they decided to describe an atheoretical experimental practice.

=== Early Modern Medicine ===
Experimental procedures pioneered by one of the Cimento’s members crossed the boundaries between physician-mathematical and medico-anatomical disciplines and can be used as a starting point in the investigation of modern-day experimental methods such as parallel trials. Francesco Redi continuously disagreed with Athanasius Kircher in the proper way to conduct experiments.

In one instance Kircher let meat out in the open. After a few days maggots appeared and Kircher said that the maggots were spontaneously generated. Redi conducted parallel trials where he took meat from the same animal and left some exposed to the air, some exposed to air, but covered so flies could not land on it and some under a glass cover. Only that meat which was exposed to flies generated maggots.

In another experiment concerning the efficacy of snake stones Kircher used letters from other Jesuits in the field which said snakestones could counteract poison. Kircher poisoned a dog, placed the snakestone on the wound and the dog recovered. Therefore, according to Kircher, Snakestones worked. Redi, on the other hand conducted many trials using different animals, different poisons and found that the Snakestone did not work all the time. The historian Meli believes that further investigation into the spread of this type of experimentation may show the Cimento and its members as pioneers in the creation of medical experimentation protocols.

=== Republic of Letters ===
From the fifteenth century through the age of enlightenment the intellectuals of Europe formed a network of knowledge exchange through the writing and sharing of letters and pamphlets known as the Republic of Letters. The scientific societies in the 17th century and their members were important members of this network. One of the most famous contributors to this Republic was Henry Oldenburg, the secretary of the Royal Society of London. Oldenburg laid the foundation for the exchange of information and ideas between scientific societies and institutionalized this exchange of ideas with the publication of the Philosophical Transactions in 1665. Robert Southwell, a friend of Robert Boyle, told Boyle and Oldenburg about the Cimento after he attended a Cimento meeting while traveling in Rome in 1660. Although Oldenburg continually tried to establish consistent contacts with the society they did not come to fruition. However, Lorenzo Magalotti made a special trip to London to present the Royal Society with a copy of the Saggi. It is argued that the reason no correspondence was established was that Robert Boyle was sensitive to having his ideas stolen and saw the Cimento as a direct competitor for priority and stature. A chance to have two prestigious societies collaborate was never realized.

== See also ==
- Old Fortress, Livorno
- Nuovo Cimento
