= Gaetano Tacconi =

Italian politician and physician

member of the Italian House of Representatives

Senator
- Incumbent
- Assumed office 1910

minister
- Incumbent
- Assumed office 1859
- Prime Minister: Luigi Carlo Farini

mayor of Bologna
- In office 1873–1908

Personal details
- Born: 4 December 1829 Bologna, Italy
- Died: 5 September 1916 (aged 86) Bologna, Italy
- Occupation: politician
- Profession: physician

Gaetano Tacconi was an Italian politician and physician. He was born on 4 December 1829 in Bologna and died on 5 September 1916 in Bologna.

== Biography ==
Gaetano Tacconi was an Italian physician, politician, and grapevine producer who was a member of the Farini Cabinet in 1859. In 1874, he was elected as a democratic deputy and in 1890 he was an independent. In 1876, he supported the Historical Right Party in the government of Farini. From 1873 to 1908, Tacconi was a municipal and provincial councilor serving as one of the longest mayors in Bologna. In 1910, he was appointed as the Senator of the Kingdom of Italy. Freemasonry, or masonry, started in 1860 in Italy, Bologna and in 1885 was affiliated to the Roman lodge "Propaganda Due" of the Grand Orient of Italy. In 1884 the Bolognese Freemasonry offered Tacconi the honorary presidency of the committee for establishing the monument of Ugo Bassi.
