= Benedetto Bacchini =

Italian Benedictine monk and scholar

Dom Benedetto Bacchini OSB
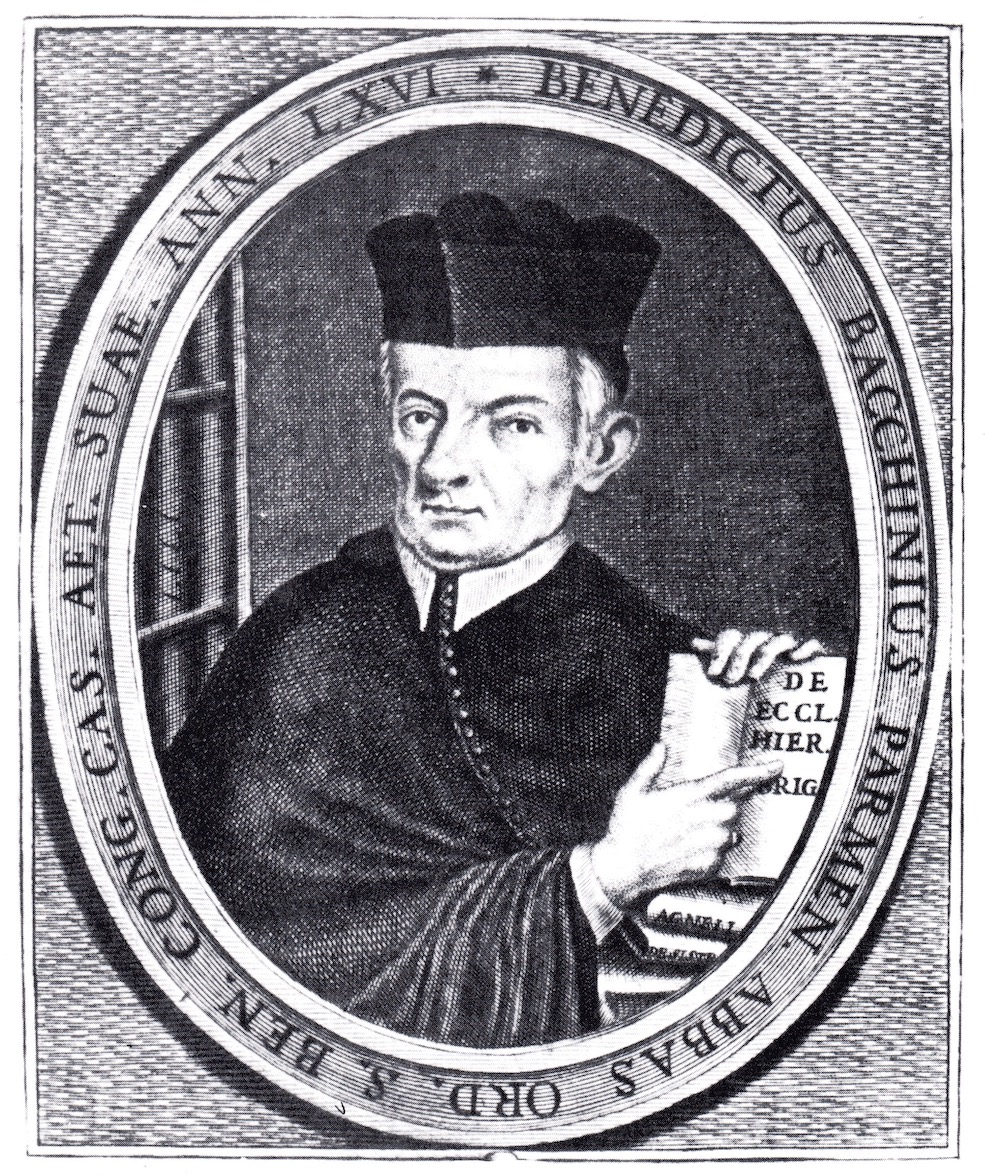
- Benedetto Bacchini
- Title: Abbot

Personal life
- Born: Bernardino Bacchini; 31 August 1651 Borgo San Donnino, Duchy of Parma
- Died: 1 September 1721 (aged 70) Ferrara, Papal States
- Parent(s): Alessandro Bacchini and Giovanna Martini
- Known for: Editio princeps of Andreas Agnellus' Liber Pontificalis Ecclesiae Ravennatis
- Occupation: Theologian and scholar

Religious life
- Religion: Roman Catholicism
- Order: Benedictines
- Ordination: 1675

Benedetto Bacchini OSB (born Bernardino Bacchini, 31 August 1651 – 1 September 1721) was an Italian Benedictine monk and scholar.

== Biography ==
Bacchini was born on 31 August 1651, at Borgo San Donnino, in the Duchy of Parma. He studied at the Jesuit institution, and entered the Order of St. Benedict in 1668, when he took the praenomen Bernardino. Prepared by his studies, he devoted his attention to preaching.

Having become secretary of the abbot of St. Benedict of Ferrara, he accompanied him to Venice, Piacenza, Parma, and Padua, and was known among the celebrated literati of the time. In 1683 he devoted himself entirely to the study of literature. In 1688 he became theologian of the duke of Parma, who desired to secure a man of such merit. In 1689 he introduced into the regulations of the Benedictine Order of St. Alexander of Parma certain modifications, which resulted in his being obliged to leave Parma. The duke of Modena appointed him in 1691 counsellor of the Inquisition.

After some journeys in the interests of science, he refused the offers of cardinal Aguirre, who wished to retain him at Rome, and was appointed Prefect of the Estense Library. In 1704 he was made prior of his order at Modena. He received other ecclesiastical honors, and died at Ferrara on 1 September 1721.

A renowned scholar, Bacchini he was a friend of Jean Mabillon, Bernard de Montfaucon, and Gottfried Wilhelm Leibniz, and influenced Ludovico Antonio Muratori and Scipione Maffei. His edition of Andreas Agnellus' Liber Pontificalis (1708) was republished by Muratori in the second volume of his Rerum italicarum scriptores (reprinted in P.L. CVI, 459–752).

== Main works ==
- Orazione nell'Esequie della Ser. Margherita de Medici, Duchessa di Parma. Parma. 1670.
- De sistrorum Figuris ac Differentia… ob sistri romani effigiem communicatam, Dissertatio. Bologna: ex typographia Pisariana. 1691.
- Anonymi Dialogi tres: De constantia; De dignitate tuenda; De amore erga rempublicam. Modena: Cassiani. 1692.
- Istoria del Monastero di S. Benedetto di Polirone. Modena: per il Capponi, e gli EE. del Pontiroli. stamp. vesc. 1696.
- De Ecclesiasticae Hierarchiae Originibus Dissertatio. Modena: typis Antonii Capponi. 1703.
- Benedetto Bacchini, ed. (1708). Agnelli, qui et Andreae Abbatis S. Mariae ad Blachernas et S. Bartholomei Ravennae Liber Pontificalis sive vitae Pontificum Ravennatum. Modena: A. Capponius.

== Bibliography ==
- This article incorporates public domain material from McClintock, John; Strong, James (1867–1887). Cyclopædia of Biblical, Theological and Ecclesiastical Literature. Harper and Brothers.
- Bertoni, Benedetto (1938). "BACCHINI, Bernardino". Enciclopedia Italiana. I Appendice. Rome: Istituto dell'Enciclopedia Italiana.
- "BACCHINI, Benedetto". Dizionario Biografico degli Italiani (in Italian). Vol. 5: Bacca–Baratta. Rome: Istituto dell'Enciclopedia Italiana. 1963. OCLC 883370.
- Bertoldi, Paola (2002). "Bacchini, Benedetto". The Oxford Companion to Italian Literature. Oxford: Oxford University Press.
- Sonia Cavicchioli; Paolo Tinti, eds. (2020). Benedetto Bacchini nell’Europa fra Sei e Settecento. Libri, arti e scienze. Modena: Franco Cosimo Panini. ISBN 978-8857017051.
