= Maria Pellegrina Amoretti =

Italian lawyer (1756–1787)

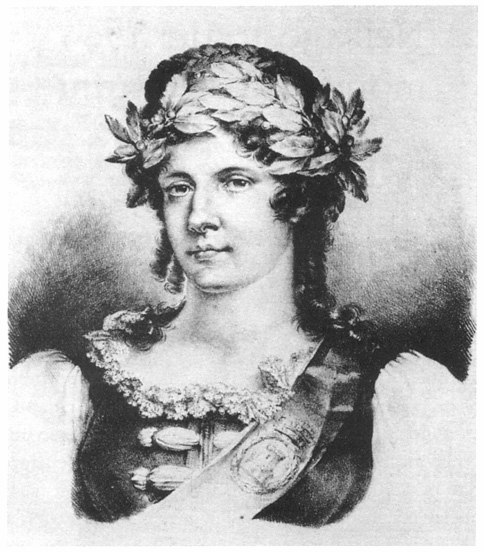
- Maria Pellegrina Amoretti
- Born: 12 May 1756; Oneglia
- Died: 12 November 1787 (aged 31); Oneglia
- Occupation: lawyer

Maria Pellegrina Amoretti (12 May 1756 – 12 November 1787), was an Italian lawyer. She is referred to as the first woman to graduate in law in Italy, and the third woman to earn a degree.

== Biography ==
Amoretti was born on 12 May 1756 in Oneglia. She was the niece of Carlo Amoretti. When she was 20 (in 1777), she became a Doctor of Laws, at the University of Pavia, where Columbus was educated. She also received a degree in philosophy from the university.

Amoretti initially applied to the University of Turin, but was rejected because she was a woman, and her graduation from the University of Pavia in 1777 is considered by historian Giulio Natali to be the “most famous graduation of the eighteenth century.”

Though Amoretti died at the age of 31, she left a manuscript on dowry laws, specifically on marriage in Roman law, which was published posthumously in 1788 by a relative, Carlo Amoretti.

She died on 12 November 1787 in Oneglia.

== Published works ==
- Amoretti, Mariae Peregrinae (1788). De iure dotium apud Romanos liber singularis (in Latin). Milan.

== Bibliography ==
- Henry Gardiner Adams, ed. (1857). "Amorette, Maria Pellegrina". A Cyclopaedia of Female Biography: 39. Wikidata Q115669592.
