= Giovanni Romagnoli =

Italian painter and sculptor

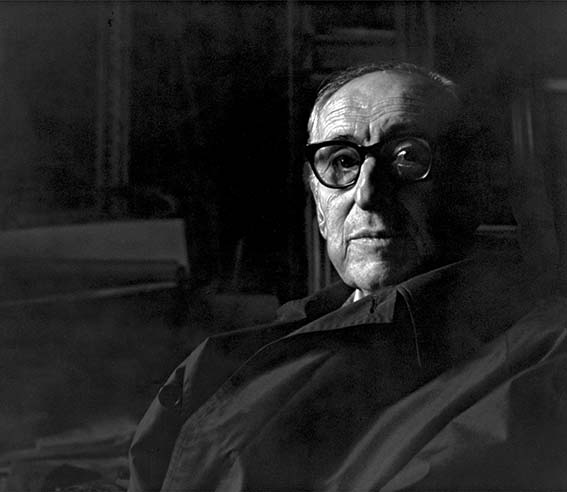
Image of Giovanni Romagnoli

Giovanni Romagnoli (Faenza, 1893 – Bologna, 1976) was an Italian painter and sculptor.

He trained at the Academy of Fine Arts of Bologna, and specialized in painting female nudes inspired by 19th century painters such as Tranquillo Cremona. He also taught at the Art school of the Carnegie Institute of Pittsburgh.
