= Oneglia =

Town in Liguria, Italy

Coordinates: 43°53′N 8°02′E

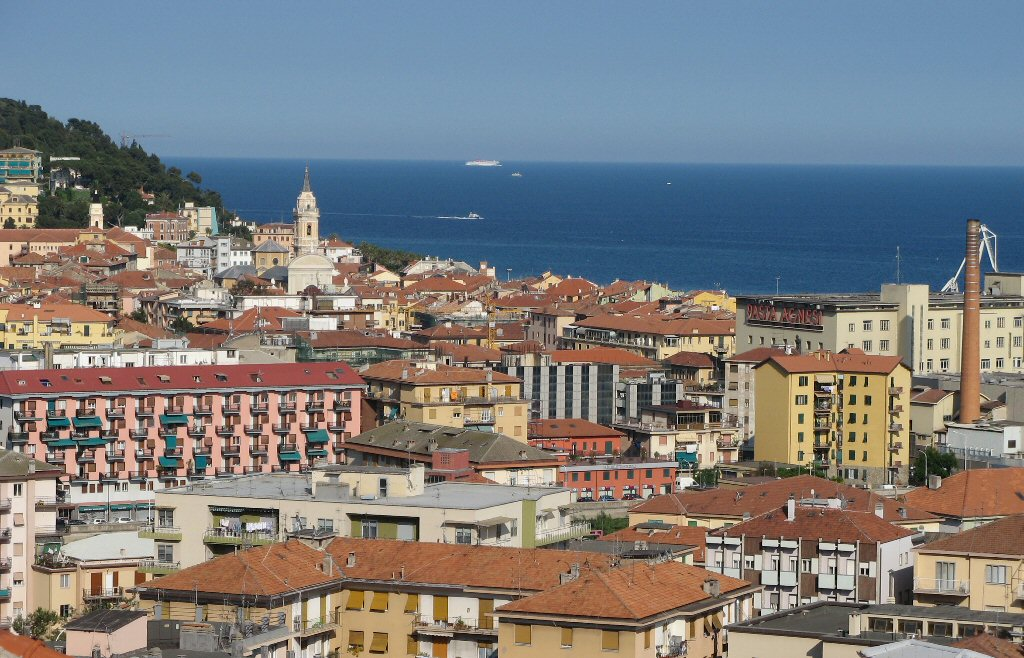
Oneglia

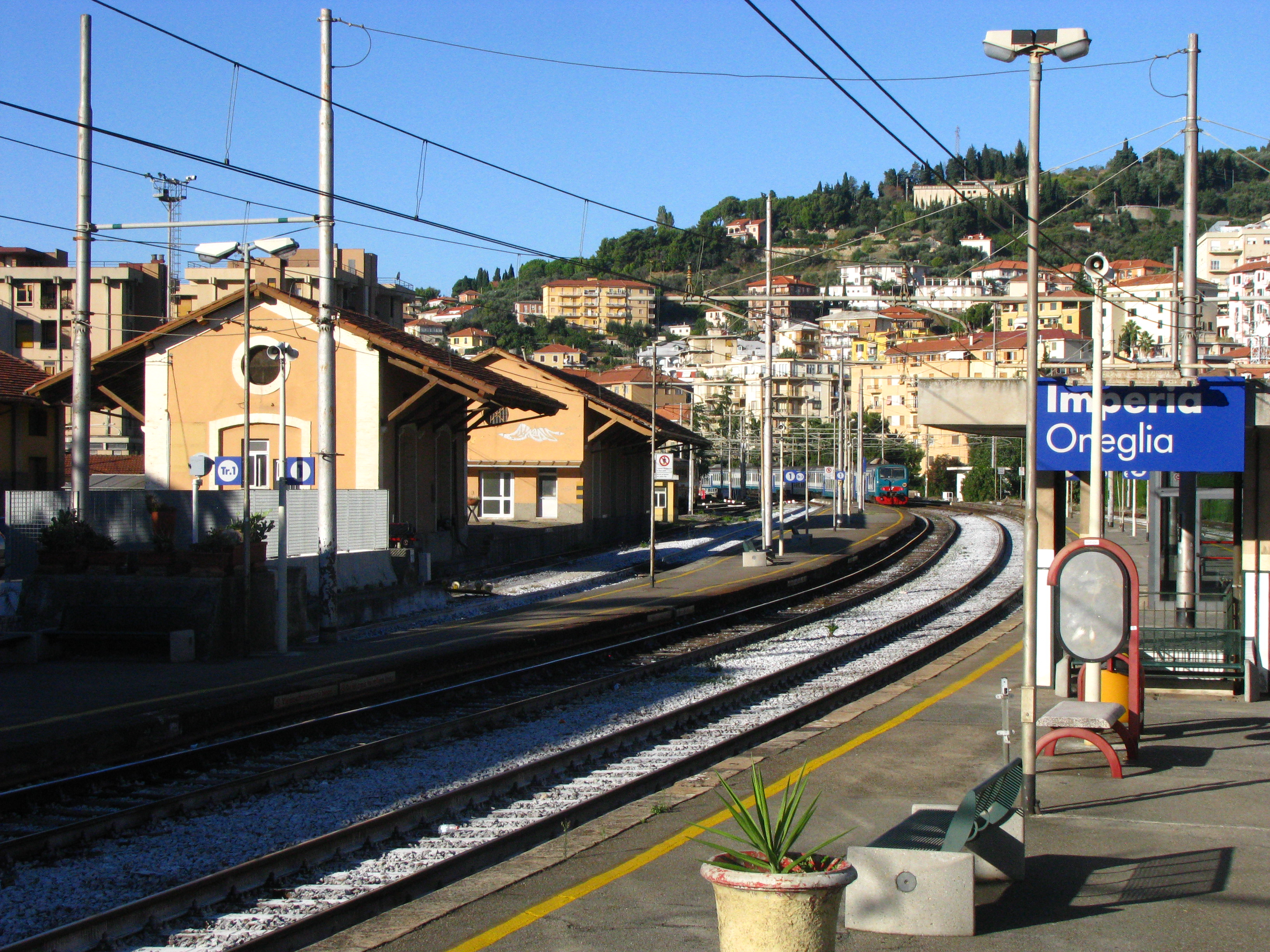
Imperia Oneglia railway station, 2010

Oneglia (Italian: [oˈneʎʎa]; Ligurian: Inêia or Ineja; Occitan: Onelha; French: Oneille) is a former town on the Ligurian coast in northern Italy, in 1923 joined to Porto Maurizio to form the municipality of Imperia. The name is still used for the suburb.

The Imperia Oneglia railway station was closed in 2016, due to the new organization of the city, which provides a new station in the middle core of the city of Imperia, to make the connection between Porto Maurizio and Oneglia easier.

== History ==
Oneglia became a papal domain in the 8th century after the Lombards transferred control of the town to the pope. Oneglia suffered from a Muslim attack during this time. However, it later recovered as the town of Ripa Uneliae, and was governed by the bishop of Albenga. The Doria Family purchased Oneglia and Porto Maurizio in 1298. The Dorias ruled the town until the 16th century (there were some brief interludes in which the Doria did not rule the town during this time). One of the Dorias, Andrea Doria, was born in Oneglia in 1466.

In 1576, Oneglia became part of the domain of the House of Savoy. The Savoyards attempted to develop Oneglia as a major port and the Savoyards and Genoese struggled for control of Oneglia during the Second Genoese-Savoyard War. Oneglia resisted Napoleon during his invasion of Italy. As a reward, it was made seat of the province in 1814 but in 1860 became part of the province of Porto Maurizio until 1923.

In the early 1930s, the area of the city now hosting the new train station was the heart of Liguria's economy, due to important oil routes crossing it.

== Notable residents ==
- Filippo Berio (1828–1894), olive oil connoisseur
- Luciano Berio (1925–2003), composer
- Grock (1880–1959), Swiss clown, who built Villa Grock here
