= Carlo Amoretti =

Italian polymath (1741–1816)

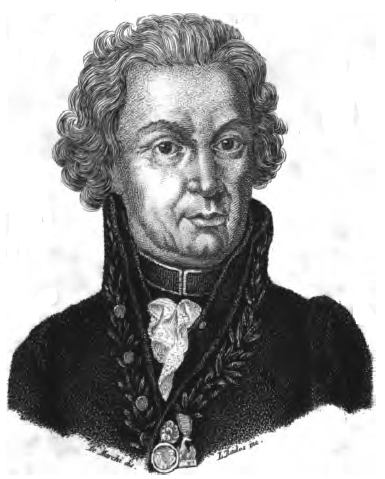
- Engraved portrait of Carlo Amoretti
- Born: 16 March 1741; Oneglia, Republic of Genua
- Died: 23 March 1816 (aged 75); Milan, Kingdom of Lombardy–Venetia
- Occupations: Writer; Scholar; Scientist
- Employers: University of Parma; Biblioteca Ambrosiana
- Known for: Discovery of the sole surviving Italian manuscript of Antonio Pigafetta's journal

Ecclesiastical career
- Religion: Christianity
- Church: Catholic Church
- Ordained: 1756

Carlo Amoretti (born 16 March 1741 in Oneglia, now part of Imperia – died 23 March 1816) was an Italian ecclesiastic and polymath. He is best known for discovering and publishing the only surviving Italian manuscript of Antonio Pigafetta's chronicle of Magellan expedition.

== Biography ==
Carlo Amoretti was born in Oneglia on 16 March 1741 into a wealthy merchant family. His father, Bernardo, was a member of the urban militia, and his mother, Vittoria Aicardi, was the daughter of a renowned lawyer from Testico.

He entered the Augustinian Order in 1757. The following year, he travelled to Pavia to pursue his studies, focusing primarily on physics, modern literature, and theology. While in Pavia, he befriended Alberto Fortis, a fellow Augustinian who introduced him to natural philosophy.

In 1761, Amoretti travelled to Milan for the first time. He stayed there for about a year before moving on to Parma to study at the convent of his order. There, he expanded his knowledge of ancient languages (Latin, Greek and Hebrew), as well as modern languages (French, English, German and Spanish). During this period, he translated Jonathan Swift's satire A Tale of a Tub into Italian and abridged it into Latin.

While in Parma, Amoretti made the acquaintance of numerous intellectuals, including Paolo Maria Paciaudi, Barnaba Chiaramonti (later Pope Pius VII), Adeodato Turchi, and the philosopher and writer Francesco Soave. Following the suppression of the Augustinian convent of Parma in 1769, Amoretti became a secular priest. That same year, he was appointed to the Chair of Canon law at the University of Parma.

A supporter of Guillaume du Tillot, Amoretti lost his position when Tillot fell from power. He first returned to his hometown, before moving to Milan at the end of 1772. There, he was introduced to Marquis Ferdinando Cusani and became the tutor of his son. He lived with the Cusani family until his death.

While in Milan, he embarked on an intense period of work as a translator and writer. From 1775 onwards, he collaborated with Giovanni Francesco Fromond and the Somascan Fathers Francesco Soave and Carlo Giuseppe Campi to the popular magazine Scelta di opuscoli interessanti sulle scienze e sulle arti. In 1780, he became secretary of the Patriotic Society of Agriculture and Arts, founded in Milan by Maria Theresa. He held this position until the society's dissolution in 1796. On 20 November 1783, he became a member of the Academy of Sciences of Turin. In 1797, Amoretti was appointed librarian at the Biblioteca Ambrosiana, where he discovered the Italian manuscript of Antonio Pigafetta's Relazione del primo viaggio intorno al mondo, which was long thought to be lost.

As a translator, he is notable for his Italian edition of Winckelmann's Geschichte der Kunst des Altertums (History of the Arts of Antiquity), published in 1779 under the title Storia delle arti del disegno presso gli antichi (History of the Arts of Drawing in the Ancient World). In 1794, he translated Ludwig Mitterpacher's Elements of Agriculture. In 1804, having gained access to Baldassarre Oltrocchi's meticulous transcriptions of Leonardo da Vinci's work, he published an edition of the Trattato della pittura, prefacing it with a detailed account of Leonardo's life, studies, and works based on archival documents.

In 1811, Amoretti published an Italian translation of Lorenzo Ferrer Maldonado's Relación del descubrimiento del estrecho de Anián, which he had discovered in the Biblioteca Ambrosiana. The following year, he published a French edition of the Relación, accompanied by a Discours intended to defend the work's authenticity. This publication sparked a passionate debate between Amoretti and the German astronomer Bernhard von Lindenau, who upheld that Maldonado was a fraud and that his expedition was a complete fabrication.

Amoretti travelled extensively, either with the Marquis Cusani, on behalf of the Patriotic Society or independently. He visited Lombardy, Liguria, Veneto, Friuli, Lazio, Campania, Austria, Ticino and France. A close friend of Arthur Young, he accompanied him on his visits to Tuscany and Emilia in 1789. His detailed, unpublished diaries from these journeys are held at the Istituto Lombardo Accademia di Scienze e Lettere. Notable among his scientific studies are Della raddomanzia, ossia Elettrometria Animale, Ricerche Fisiche e Storiche (1808), Elementi di Elettrometria Animale (1816) and Viaggio da Milano ai Tre Laghi Maggiore, di Lugano e di Como e ne' Monti che li Circondano (1794).

== Discovery of Pigafetta's journal ==
In 1797, Amoretti discovered the lost Italian manuscript of Pigafetta's journal, the primary firsthand account of Ferdinand Magellan's historic 1519–1522 expedition. Dated between 1523 and 1525, the manuscript includes twenty maps and a treatise on navigation. Most Magellan scholars consider it the oldest and most complete of the four surviving manuscripts, although there is a consensus among paleographers that all surviving codices are merely copies of a lost original. The other three extant manuscripts are all in French. Two of them are held at the Bibliothèque nationale de France (MSS 5650 and 24224), while the third, considered the finest of all, is held at the Beinecke Rare Book and Manuscript Library in New Haven, Connecticut (Beinecke MS 351).

=== Garbled edition ===
Amoretti lost no time in transcribing, editing, and annotating the manuscript. He published his edition of Pigafetta in 1800 under the title Primo viaggio intorno al globo terracqueo ossia ragguaglio della navigazione alle Indie orientali per la via d'occidente fatta dal cavaliere Antonio Pigafetta patrizio vicentino sulla squadra del capit. Magaglianes negli anni 1519-1522. The following year a French edition, translated by Amoretti himself, was published in Paris by H.J. de Jansen. The discovery caused a sensation, and translations into German, English, and Spanish soon followed.

Amoretti's edition was the basis for the writings on Magellan's expedition by José Toribio Medina and Francis Henry Hill Guillemard whose biography of Magellan is still considered the leading work on the Portuguese navigator. Navigation historians and Magellan scholars, among them James Alexander Robertson, Donald D. Brand, and Martin Torodash, fault Amoretti's edition for taking liberties with Pigafetta's text. Robertson accused Amoretti of committing "the sin of editing the precious document, almost beyond recognition." Brand describes the work as "somewhat garbled." According to Theodore J. Cachey Jr. Amoretti's edition "bowdlerized the text in an effort to exposit with the necessary decency the account of some strange customs written by him [Pigafetta] in frank terms which would offend the delicacy and modesty of the reader of good taste."

== Works ==
Opuscoli scelti sulle scienze e sulle arti, 1778

- Carlo Amoretti; Francesco Soave (1775–1777). Scelta di opuscoli interessanti tradotti da varie lingue. 36 vols. Milan: Giuseppe Marelli.
- Opuscoli scelti sulle scienze e sulle arti. Vol. 1. Milan: Giuseppe Marelli. 1778.
- Opuscoli scelti sulle scienze e sulle arti. Vol. 2. Milan: Giuseppe Marelli. 1779.
- Opuscoli scelti sulle scienze e sulle arti. Vol. 3. Milan: Giuseppe Marelli. 1780.
- Opuscoli scelti sulle scienze e sulle arti. Vol. 4. Milan: Giuseppe Marelli. 1781.
- Opuscoli scelti sulle scienze e sulle arti. Vol. 6. Milan: Giuseppe Marelli. 1783.
- Educazione delle api per la Lombardia. Milan: Giuseppe Galeazzi. 1788.
- Viaggio ai tre laghi: Maggiore, di Lugano e di Como e ne' monti che li circondano. Milan: Giuseppe Galeazzi. 1794.
- Antonio Pigafetta (1800). Primo viaggio intorno al globo terracqueo ossia Ragguaglio della nauigazione alle Indie Orientali per la via d'Occidente fatta dal caualiere Antonio Pigafetta ... sulla squadra del capit. Magaglianes negli anni 1519-1522. Ora pubblicato per la prima volta, tratto da un codice ms. della Biblioteca Ambrosiana di Milano e corredato di note da Carlo Amoretti; contiene anche: Raccolta di vocaboli fatta dal caualiere Antonio Pigafetta ne' paesi, ove durante la navigazione fece qualche dimora. Con un Transunto del Trattato di nauigazione dello stesso autore. Milan: Giuseppe Galeazzi.
  - Antonio Pigafetta (1801). Premier voyage autour du monde, par le chev. Pigafetta, sur l'escadre de Magellan, pendant les annees 1519, 20, 21 et 22; suivi de l'extrait du Traite de navigation du meme auteur; et d'une notice sur le chevalier Martin Behaim, avec la description de son globe terrestre...Publie pour la premiere fois, en italien, sur un manuscrit de la Bibliotheque Ambroisienne de Milan; avec des notes; par Charles Amoretti...et traduit en francois par le meme. Paris: H.J. Jansen.
  - Antonio Pigafetta (1801). Beschreibung der von Magellan unternommenen ersten Reise um die Welt (1519-22); aus einer Handschrift der Ambros. Bibliothek zu Mayland von Amoretti zum erstenmal herausgeg. Translated by Ch. W. Jacobs and F. Kries. Gotha: Just. Perthes.
- Della coltivazione delle patate e loro uso. Milan: Giuseppe Galeazzi. 1801.
- Memorie storiche su la vita gli studi e le opere di Lionardo da Vinci. Milan: Giusti, Ferrario & Co. 1804.
- Nuova scelta di opuscoli interessanti sulle scienze e sulle arti. Milan: Giacomo Agnelli. 1804.
- Delle torbiere esistenti nel dipartimento d'Olona e limitrofi, e de' loro vantaggi, ed usi. Milan: Camillo Scorza. 1807.
- Elogio letteratio del signor Alberto Fortis membro della societa italiana delle scienze. Verona: Giovanni Gambaretti. 1809.
- Della torba e della lignite combustibili che possno sostituirsi alle legne nel Regno d'Italia. Milan: Giovanni Pirotta. 1810.
- Coltivazioni delle api pel regno d'Italia. Alvisopoli: N. e G. Bettoni. 1811.
- Della ricerca del carbon fossile, suoi vantaggi e suo uso nel Regno d'Italia. Milan: Gio. Bernardoni. 1811.
- Viaggio dal mare Atlantico al Pacifico per la via del Nord-Ovest fatto dal capitano Lorenzo Ferrer Maldonado, l'anno 1588. Milan: Giovanni Silvestri. 1811.
  - Appendice al viaggio di Ferrer Maldonado. Lettera apologetica di C.A. al Sig. B. di L. Milan: Tipografia Pirotta. 1813.
- Della raddomanzia, ossia Elettrometria Animale: Ricerche Fisiche e Storiche. Milan: Giuseppe Marelli. 1812.
- Del governo dei bachi da seta, detti volgarmente bigatti. 2 vols. Milan: Sonzogno. 1815.
- Viaggio da Milano a Nizza di Carlo Amoretti ed altro da Berlino a Nizza e ritorno da Nizza a Berlino di Giangiorgio Sulzer fatto negli anni 1775 e 1776. Milan: Giovanni Silvestri. 1819.

== Sources ==
- Bossi, Luigi (1820). "Elogio letterario del sig. abate Don Carlo Amoretti". Memorie di matematica e di fisica della Società italiana delle scienze residente in Modena. XVIII: 38–56.
- "Carlo Amoretti". The Biographical Dictionary of the Society for the Diffusion of Useful Knowledge. Vol. II. Part II. London. 1843. pp. 492–494.
- Magnaghi, Alberto (1935). "Pigafetta, Antonio". Enciclopedia Italiana (in Italian). Rome: Istituto dell'Enciclopedia Italiana.
- De Felice, Renzo (1961). "Amoretti, Carlo". Dizionario Biografico degli Italiani (in Italian). Vol. 3: Ammirato–Arcoleo. Rome: Istituto dell'Enciclopedia Italiana. OCLC 883370.
- Bernardi, Walter (2001). "The Controversy on Animal Electricity in Eighteenth Century Italy: Galvani, Volta and Others" (PDF). Revue d'histoire des sciences. 54 (1): 101–114.
- Visconti, Agnese (2015). "Carlo Amoretti in viaggio tra Lombardia Austriaca e Mendrisiotto (1791): sentimenti d'amore e interessi scientifici". Archivio Storico Ticinese. 157: 108–123.
- Jostmann, Christian (2019). "Magellan – Der Mensch Und Sein Mythos". Magellan: Oder Die Erste Umsegelung Der Erde. Verlag C.H.Beck. pp. 315–23. JSTOR j.ctv1168zgs.18.
- Cachey, Theodore J., Jr. (2007). "Bio-bibliographical Note". In Theodore J. Cachey Jr. (ed.). Antonio Pigafetta. The First Voyage around the World, 1519-1522: An Account of Magellan's Expedition. Toronto: University of Toronto Press. pp. XXXVII–LVI. doi:10.3138/9781442684928-002. ISBN 978-1487525408.
- Torodash, Martin (1971). "Magellan Historiography". The Hispanic American Historical Review. LI (2): 313–335. doi:10.2307/2512478. JSTOR 2512478.
- Sánchez Ramos, Valeriano; Viciana Martínez-Lage, Alfonso (2021). "Lorenzo Ferrer Maldonado: el almeriense que descubrió el estrecho de Bering" (PDF). REAL, Revista de Estudios Almerienses. 1: 6–52.
