= Palazzo del Governo, Imperia =

Palazzo del Governo
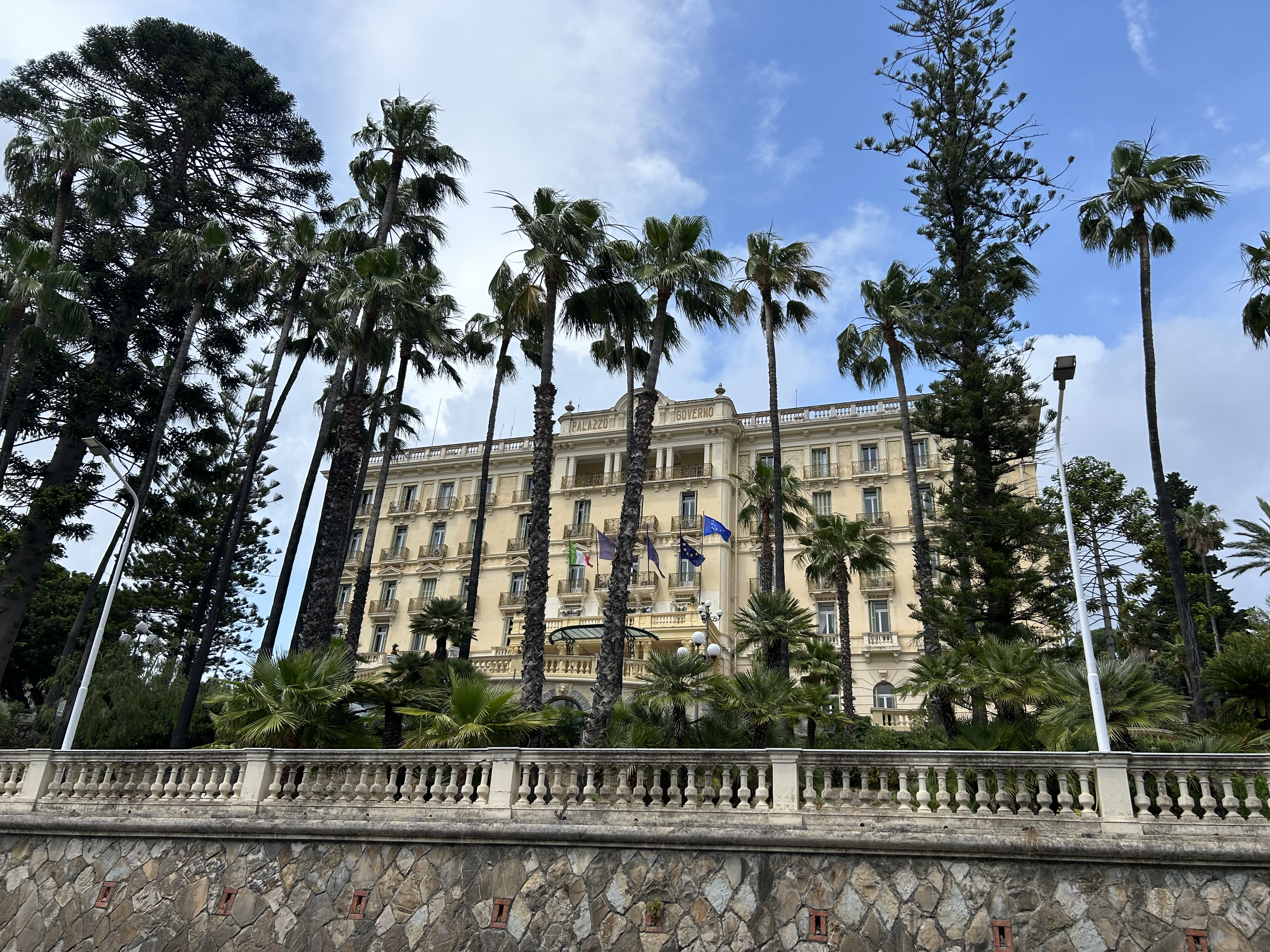
- Palazzo del Governo, Imperia, in 2026
- Click on the map for a fullscreen view

General information
- Location: Imperia, Italy
- Coordinates: 43°53′00.55″N 8°01′18.72″E

The Palazzo del Governo, also known as the Palazzo della Provincia e della Prefettura, is a historic building located in Imperia, Italy. Originally born as the Grand Hotel Riviera Palace, it now houses public administration offices of the Province of Imperia.

== History ==
The building was constructed in the early twentieth century as a luxury hotel under the name Grand Hotel Riviera Palace. Its development formed part of a broader initiative to promote tourism in the town and was backed by a company established in 1903 by local entrepreneurs and prominent citizens.

At the time of its inauguration, the hotel offered 68 guest rooms and featured some of the most modern amenities available, including electric lighting, stables, and tennis courts. The hotel operated for approximately a decade, from 1906 to 1916, and welcomed several distinguished guests, among them U.S. President Theodore Roosevelt.

During the First World War, the building served as a hospital of the Red Cross. In 1919, it was purchased by the Province of Porto Maurizio, which moved its headquarters there the year following the merger of the municipalities of Porto Maurizio and Oneglia on 3 December 1922, which led to the creation of the city of Imperia.

The building has been protected as a heritage property since 2007.

Between 2023 and 2024, the building underwent restoration works and energy-efficiency upgrades.
