= Gaetano Amadeo =

Italian organist and composer

Gaetano Amadeo (1824 – 8 April 1893) was an Italian organist and composer. He spent most of his career in Marseille, where he lived for 27 years and founded a school of plainsong, an exceptional undertaking at this time.

== Biography ==
Born at Porto Maurizio, a small town in Ligurian Riviera, Italy, he first studied in Lucca with Giovanni Pacini. After 1841 he studies in Bologna with Rossini who held him in high esteem. He was voted into the famous Philharmonic Academy of Bologna in Bologna in 1843.

Holding Rossini's written recommendation, he settled in Marseille where he became organist of the St. Joseph Church on 1 June 1848, right after the inauguration of Joseph Callinet's organ. He kept this duty until July 1861. Accordingly, he was not acquainted with Aristide Cavaillé-Coll's organ (1868). He became choir master in the cathedral in 1852. He made the Pavian organ builder L. Lingiardi acquainted with French organ building.

Around 1875 he left Marseille for an unknown reason – perhaps sentimental – and settled in Cannes. He moved back to Genova and Porto Maurizio, respectively, in 1883 and 1884, from where he wrote to P. C. Remondini, the famous sacred-music reformist, whose ideas he shared.

At an unknown date he moved back to France. He is found in Cannes in 1887 at the organ of a suburban church. He spent his last years in Nice where he died. He had no close relatives and bequeathed his library and score collection to an unknown person, who wrote a catalogue and tried to sell it. Most documents were donated to the Conservatoire of Nice.
