= Villa Grock =

House in Imperia, Italy

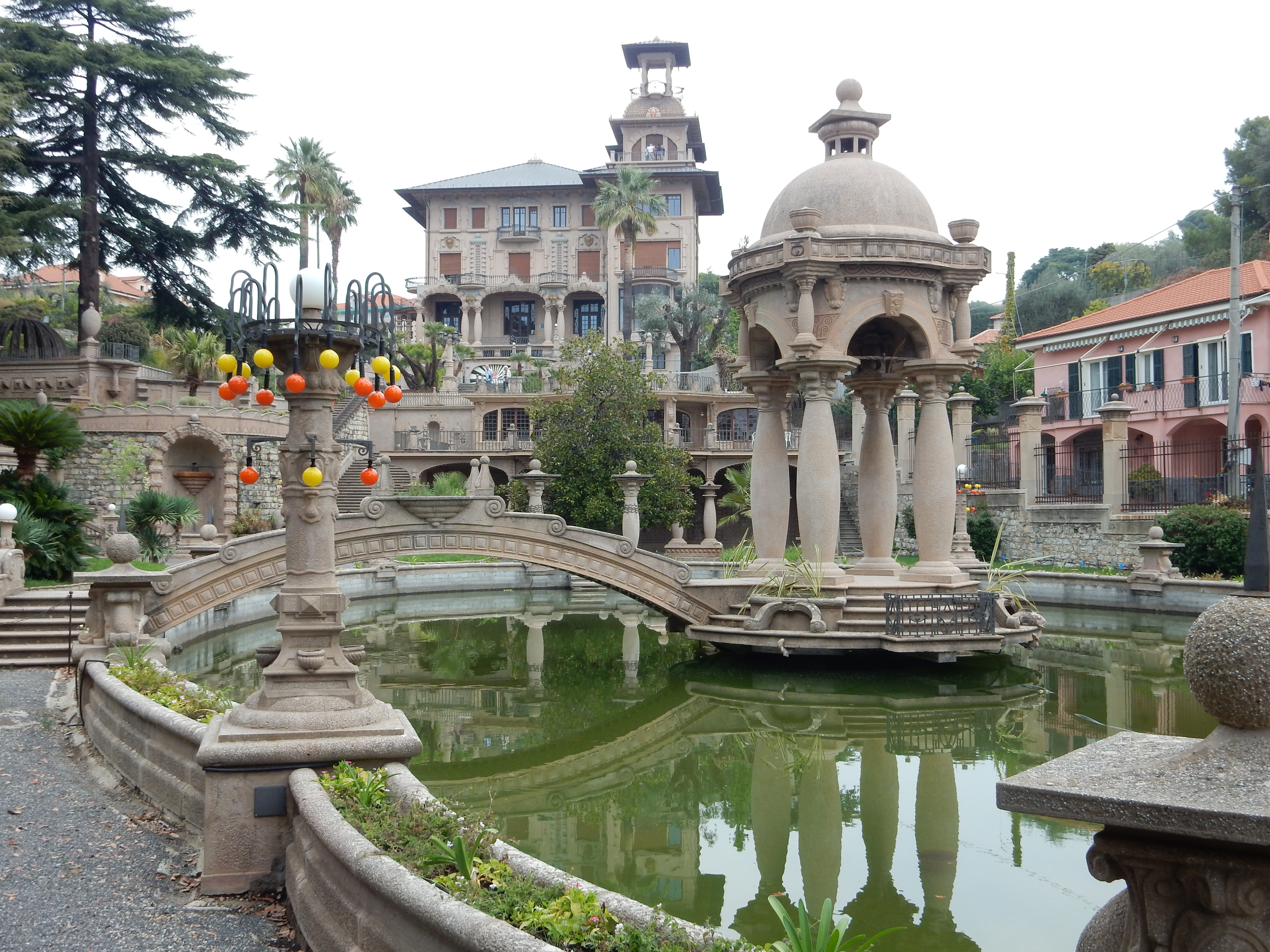
- Interactive map of the Villa Grock area

General information
- Architectural style: Jugendstil; Art Deco
- Location: Oneglia, Imperia, Italy
- Coordinates: 43°53′40″N 8°2′40.5″E
- Current tenants: Museo del Clown
- Construction started: 1927
- Inaugurated: 1930
- Client: Grock

Villa Grock, originally Villa Bianca, is a building in Imperia, Liguria. It was the home of Charles Adrien Wettach (1880–1959), a Swiss clown best known under his stage name Grock, who for a period was the most highly paid entertainer in Europe. Since 2013, the building houses the Museo del Clown.

== History ==
Grock first visited Imperia, a coastal town on the Italian Riviera, in 1920 to meet his inlaws. He built a small villa for them in 1922, named Villa Bianca, which may have referred to his stepdaughter's name or the white colour of the building. Over the next few years, Grock vacationed at this house after his tours and gradually had it expanded. In 1927, he acquired a larger, triangular plot and began to enlarge it to a 3-storey house with 47 rooms, in which he lived for the remainder of his life.

== Architecture ==
Grock was heavily involved in the creation of the house and its decorations, which combine Jugendstil and Art Deco with Persian, Baroque and Rococo influences. The garden has elements that allude to circus culture, clowning and Grock's interests in astrology and astronomy.

== Open to the public ==
The province of Imperia acquired the building in 2002. It underwent restoration, opened to the public and was turned into a museum, Museo del Clown, which received money from the European Union and opened on 20 August 2013. The museum is intended to present clowning to adults and children and exhibits many of Grock's belongings. It offers interactive multimedia installations, clown-related games for children and a collection of estoreric and Masonic prints.
