= Lorenzo Ferrer Maldonado =

Spanish navigator and adventurer

Lorenzo Ferrer Maldonado (1557 – 1625) was a Spanish navigator and adventurer, author of a detailed account – which gained some degree of credibility – in which he claimed to have traversed the Northwest Passage during the winter of 1588.

== Life ==
Little is known about Maldonado's life. He was born in Almería to Micer Juan Ferrer, a merchant from Berja, and of Doña Inés de Maldonado, a native of Guadix. Around 1600, he managed to evade a trial in which he was accused of forging documents. He probably travelled to Newfoundland in 1609. That same year, he travelled to Madrid, presenting himself as a naval officer and claiming to have discovered a strait in 1588 that would allow one to reach the Philippines and the Moluccas in three months. He also asserted to have discovered a method of determining longitude at sea using a magnetic needle and offered to reveal it in exchange for 5,000 ducats. Maldonado died in Madrid in 1625. He left behind a geographical treatise titled Imagen del mundo which was published posthumously in 1626 and contains no mention of his alleged voyage through the Northwest Passage.

== Relación del descubrimiento del estrecho de Anián ==
Reconstruction of the route of Lorenzo Ferrer Maldonado's alleged expedition

In 1609, Maldonado presented his Relación del descubrimiento del estrecho de Anián to Philip III of Spain, likely in an attempt to capitalize on the growing concern in Spain regarding English efforts to discover a Northwest Passage. Maldonado claimed that he had set sail from Lisbon in February 1588 with Miguel Alvear, Bartolomé de Velasco and his pilot Juan Martínez aboard two merchant ships named La Esperanza and Santa Ana, in search of the Northwest Passage. According to his account, the expedition entered what he described as the Strait of Anián (today's Bering Strait), and crossed from the Atlantic to the Pacific Ocean. After exploring the American coast as far south as the 55th parallel, the expedition allegedly returned to Spain by way of the Strait of Anián and the Northwest Passage. Maldonado argued that Spain needed to take control of the Strait of Anián before the English could reach it, and discussed the economic and political advantages that controlling this short trade route to the Far East would bring to the nation.

Maldonado was evidently aware of the English voyages of that period, particularly those of John Davis. He was probably also aware of the support that Michael Lok had given to Juan de Fuca, who claimed to have discovered the Strait of Anián in 1592. Despite the persuasive tone of his arguments, he failed to spark the interest of the authorities in his alleged discoveries or secure any funding for his proposed projects. Influenced by García de Silva Figueroa's negative opinions of Maldonado, the Marquis of Velada – who served as the King's Chief Steward and as a member of the Council of State – dismissed the Relación as a forgery.

An unknown number of manuscript copies of the Relación circulated during Maldonado's lifetime. The Duke of Almodóvar published an edition of the Relación in 1788, but the work did not attract attention until 1790, when Philippe Buache presented a paper on it to the French Academy of Sciences. Buache maintained the authenticity of Maldonado's discovery and proposed naming the Bering Strait the "Ferrer Strait". Buache's endorsement of Maldonado's claims prompted the Spanish government to instruct Alejandro Malaspina, who was then in Mexico, to undertake a new exploration of the north-west coast in search of a strait near the 60th parallel in 1791. This voyage, however, yielded no results.

In 1811, librarian Carlo Amoretti published an Italian translation of the Relación, which he had discovered in the Biblioteca Ambrosiana in Milan. The following year, he released a new French edition accompanied by a Discours intended to defend the work's authenticity. Although Amoretti acknowledged errors in the recorded route, attributing them to the technical limitations of the era in which the journey took place, he maintained that Maldonado had actually traversed the Northwest Passage. He believed that the Spanish Crown had suppressed the discovery in order to prevent it from falling into enemy hands. German astronomer Bernhard von Lindenau rejected Amoretti's conclusions, publishing a series of rebuttals in Franz Xaver von Zach's Correspondance Astronomique, in which he called Maldonado an impostor and the voyage a pure fabrication.

In 1849, Martín Fernández de Navarrete and, later, Pedro de Novo y Colson published accounts refuting Maldonado's claims and categorising the Relación alongside the apocryphal narratives of Juan de Fuca and Bartholomew de Fonte. However, due to the resemblance between the Bering Strait and the Strait of Anian as described by Maldonado, some scholars lend credence to his claims and consider his Relación genuine.

== Works ==
Imagen del mundo, Alcalá, 1626

- Imagen del mundo, sobre la esfera, cosmografía, y geografía, teórica de planetas, y arte de nauegar. Alcalá: por Iuan Garcia y Antonio Duplastre. 1626.
- "Relación del descubrimiento del Estrecho de Anián", in Pedro Francisco de Luján y Góngora, Historia Politica de Los Establecimientos Ultramarinos de Las Naciones Europeas (5 vols., Madrid, 1784–90), IV, pp. 579–592.
- Viaggio dal mare Atlantico al Pacifico per la via del Nord-Ovest fatto dal capitano Lorenzo Ferrer Maldonado, l'anno 1588. Milan: Giovanni Silvestri. 1811.
  - Voyage de la mer Atlantique à l'océan Pacifique ..., traduit d'un manuscrit espagnol et suivi d'un discours qui en démontre l'authenticité et la veracité. Piacenza: de l'imprimerie del Majno. 1812.

== Bibliography ==
- Sánchez Ramos, Valeriano. "Lorenzo Ferrer Maldonado". Diccionario biográfico español. Madrid: Royal Academy of History.
- Buache, Philippe (1881). "Memoria leída en la Academia de la Ciencias de París por Mr. Buache". In Pedro de Novo y Colson (ed.). Sobre los viajes apócrifos de Juan de Fuca y de Lorenzo Ferrer Maldonado. Madrid: Fortanet. pp. 123–153.
- Wagner, H.R. (1931). "Apocryphal voyages to the northwest coast of America". Proceedings of the American Antiquarian Society. XLI: 179–234.
- Cooke, Alan (2003). "FERRER MALDONADO, LORENZO". Dictionary of Canadian Biography. Vol. 1. Toronto: University of Toronto/Université Laval.
- Sánchez Ramos, Valeriano; Viciana Martínez-Lage, Alfonso (2021). "Lorenzo Ferrer Maldonado: el almeriense que descubrió el estrecho de Bering" (PDF). REAL, Revista de Estudios Almerienses. 1: 6–52.
- Frías, Moreno; Ángeles, María; Sánchez Ramos, Valeriano (2022). "Imagen del mundo sobre la esfera, de Lorenzo Ferrer Maldonado: un trato de ciencias prácticas del siglo XVII". Revista Farua. Centro Virgitano de Estudios Históricos: 67–102.
