= Imperia railway station =

Railway station in Italy

Imperia
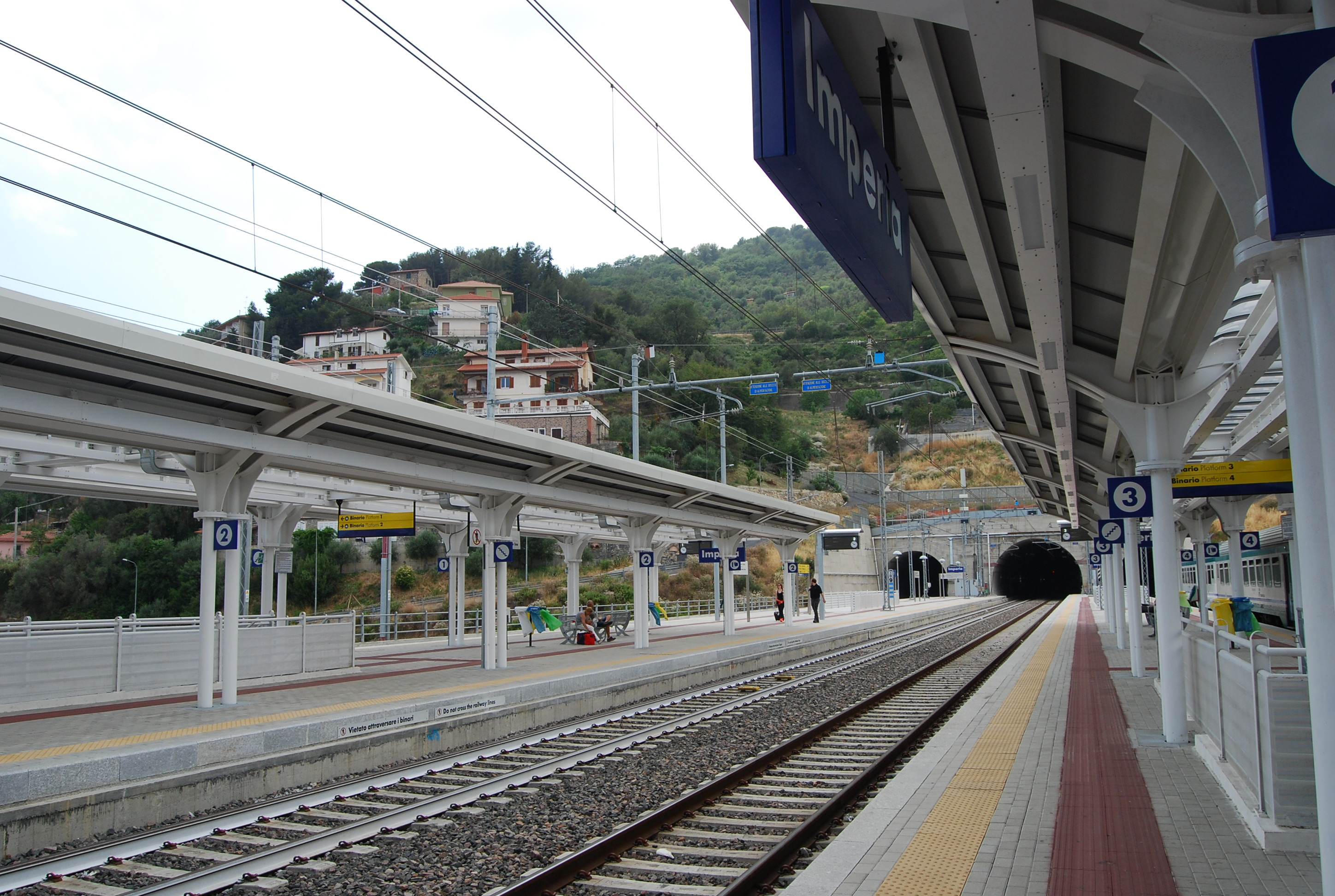
- Imperia station platforms

General information
- Location: Imperia, Imperia, Liguria; Italy
- Coordinates: 43°53′49″N 08°01′51″E
- Operator: Rete Ferroviaria Italiana; Centostazioni
- Line: Genoa–Ventimiglia
- Distance: 108.96 km (67.70 mi) from Genova Piazza Principe
- Platforms: 4
- Tracks: 4
- Train operators: Trenitalia, Thello
- Connections: Urban and suburban buses

Other information
- Classification: Silver

History
- Opened: 11 December 2016; 9 years ago
Location
- Location within Northern Italy

Imperia railway station (Italian: Stazione di Imperia) is a railway station serving the city of Imperia, in Liguria, northwestern Italy. The station is located on the Genoa–Ventimiglia railway and was opened on 11 December 2016. The train services are operated by Trenitalia.

== History ==
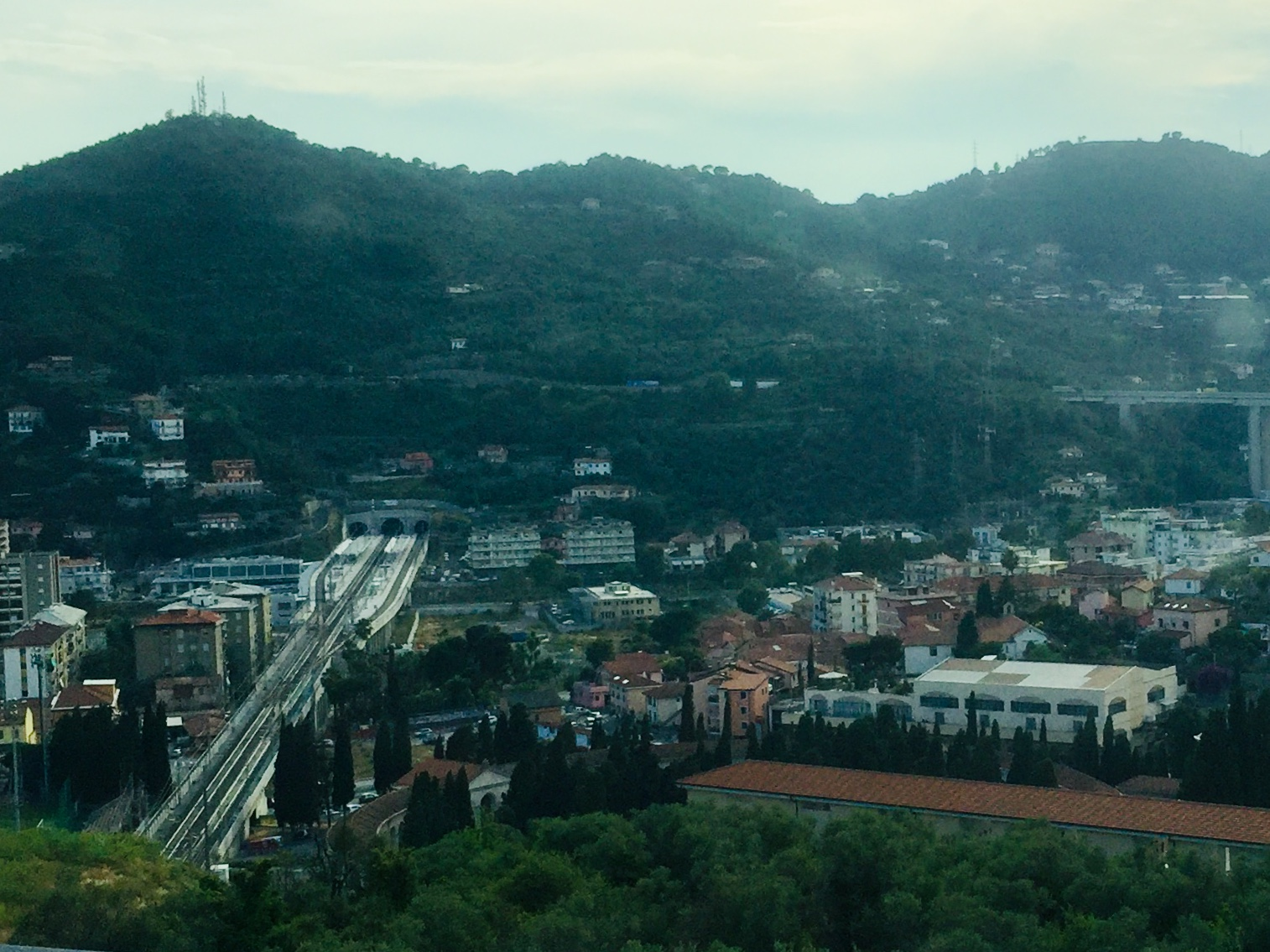
Imperia railway station and the entrance to the Bardellini tunnel, seen from the Autostrada A10

Until 2016, the city of Imperia was served by two separate railway stations, Imperia Porto Maurizio and Imperia Oneglia on the single-track Genoa–Ventimiglia railway. As part of the continuing project to increase capacity, a new double-track line has been constructed to run parallel to the old line along a route further inland. The 18 kilometres (11 mi) section of double-track railway between Andora and San Lorenzo opened in 2016, running largely through tunnels, rather than winding along the coast. The new Imperia station replaced the two old stations, which have been closed.

Imperia station is located approximately 880 metres (0.55 mi) north of the old Imperia Oneglia station, on an elevated viaduct over the River Impero.

== Train services ==
The station is served by the following service(s):

- InterCity services Ventimiglia - Savona - Genoa - La Spezia - Pisa - Livorno - Rome
- InterCity services Ventimiglia - Savona - Genoa - Milan
- Regional services (Treno regionale) Ventimiglia - Savona - Genoa - Sestri Levante - La Spezia - Santo Stefano di Magra
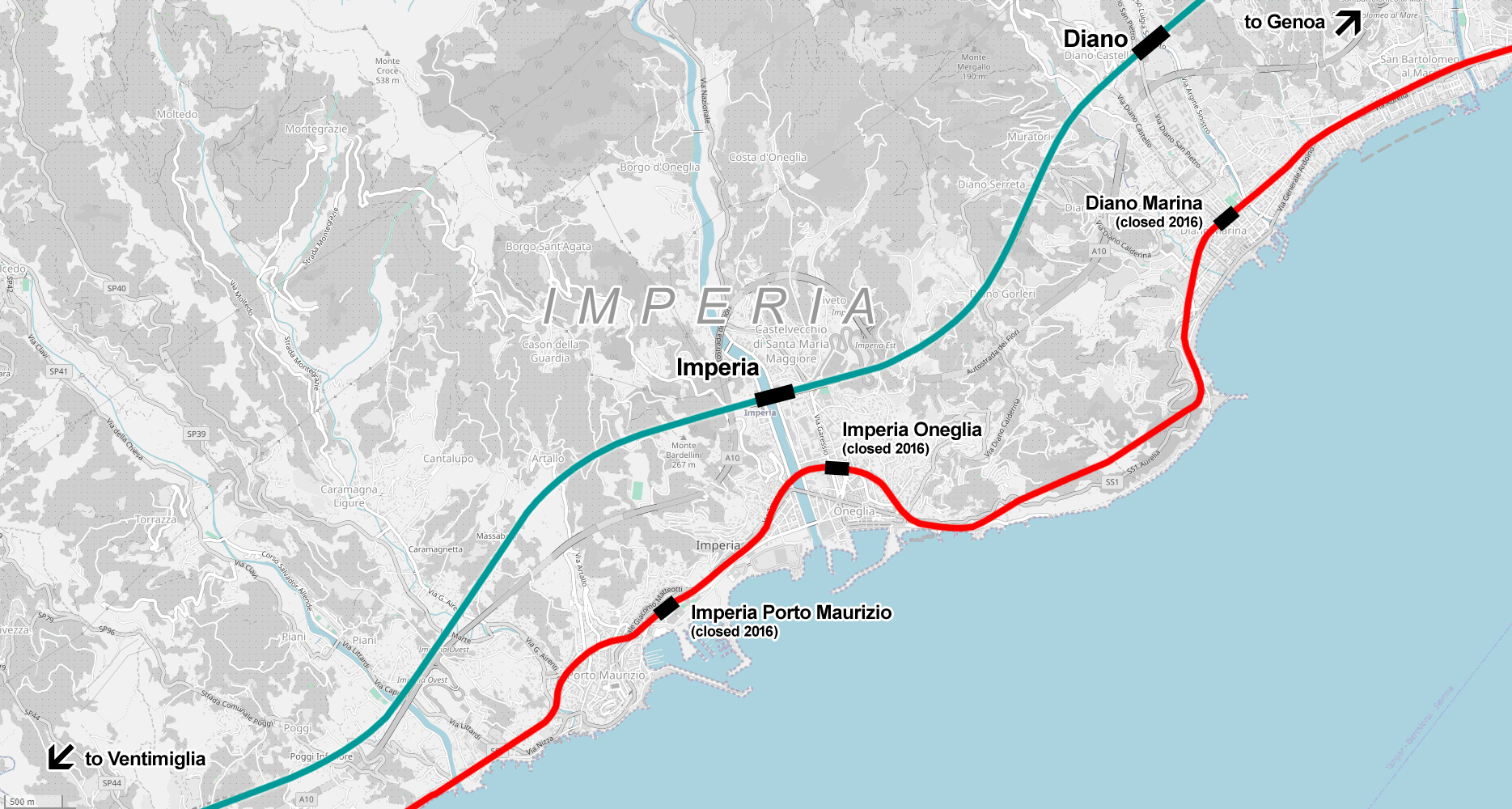
The old and new lines of the Genoa–Ventimiglia railway that pass through Imperia

== See also ==
- History of rail transport in Italy
- List of railway stations in Liguria
- Rail transport in Italy
- Railway stations in Italy
