= Imperia Porto Maurizio railway station =

Railway station in Italy

Imperia Porto Maurizio
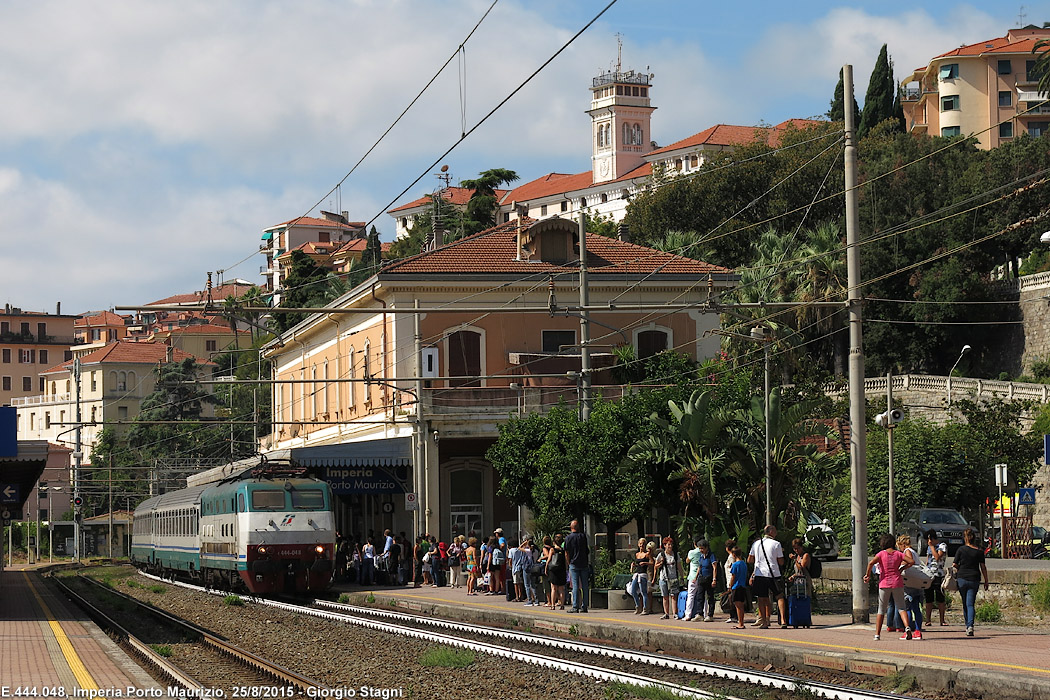

General information
- Location: Piazza Caduti sul Lavoro; 18100 Imperia IM; Imperia, Imperia, Liguria; Italy
- Coordinates: 43°52′47″N 08°01′03″E
- Operator: Rete Ferroviaria Italiana; Centostazioni
- Line: Genoa–Ventimiglia
- Distance: 109.00 km (67.73 mi) from Genova Piazza Principe
- Train operators: Trenitalia
- Connections: Urban and suburban buses

Other information
- Classification: Silver

History
- Opened: 1872; 154 years ago
- Closed: 11 December 2016; 9 years ago
Location
- Location within Liguria Location within Northern Italy Location within Italy

Imperia Porto Maurizio railway station (Italian: Stazione di Imperia Porto Maurizio) was one of two stations serving the city and comune of Imperia, in Liguria, northwestern Italy. Opened in 1872, it formed part of the Genoa–Ventimiglia railway, and was situated just over two thirds along the way from Genoa towards Ventimiglia. It was replaced on 11 December 2016, along with Imperia's other former railway station, Imperia Oneglia, 2.2 kilometres (1.4 mi) to the east, by a new inland station, simply named Imperia, situated on a new double-track line replacing the old coastal route.

The station was managed by Rete Ferroviaria Italiana (RFI), however, the commercial area of the passenger building was managed by Centostazioni. Train services to and from the station were operated by Trenitalia. Each of these companies is a subsidiary of Ferrovie dello Stato (FS), Italy's state-owned rail company.

== Location ==
Imperia Porto Maurizio railway station was situated in Piazza Caduti sul Lavoro, near the centre of the city.

== Features ==
The passenger building has two storeys. Only the ground floor was open to the public. The building is made of brick, painted brown, and has nine single-light windows with round arches accompanied by cornices.

The station once had a goods yard with an adjoining goods shed. However, the goods yard had since been dismantled and replaced by a parking lot for RFI and Trenitalia employees, and the goods shed had been converted to storage. The architecture of the former goods shed is very similar to that of other Italian railway stations.

There is also a small one-storey building that housed the station chapel. All of the station buildings are rectangular in shape.

The station yard comprises three tracks. Each of them has a platform sheltered by a canopy. The platforms are connected by an underpass.

== Passenger and train movements ==
The station had about 600,000 passenger movements each year. It was served by both regional and InterCity trains. The main destinations of passengers embarking at the station were Ventimiglia, Genoa and Milano Centrale.

== Train services ==
The station was last served by the following service(s):

- EuroCity services (Thello) Marseille - Cannes - Nice - Monaco - Ventimiglia - Genoa - Milan
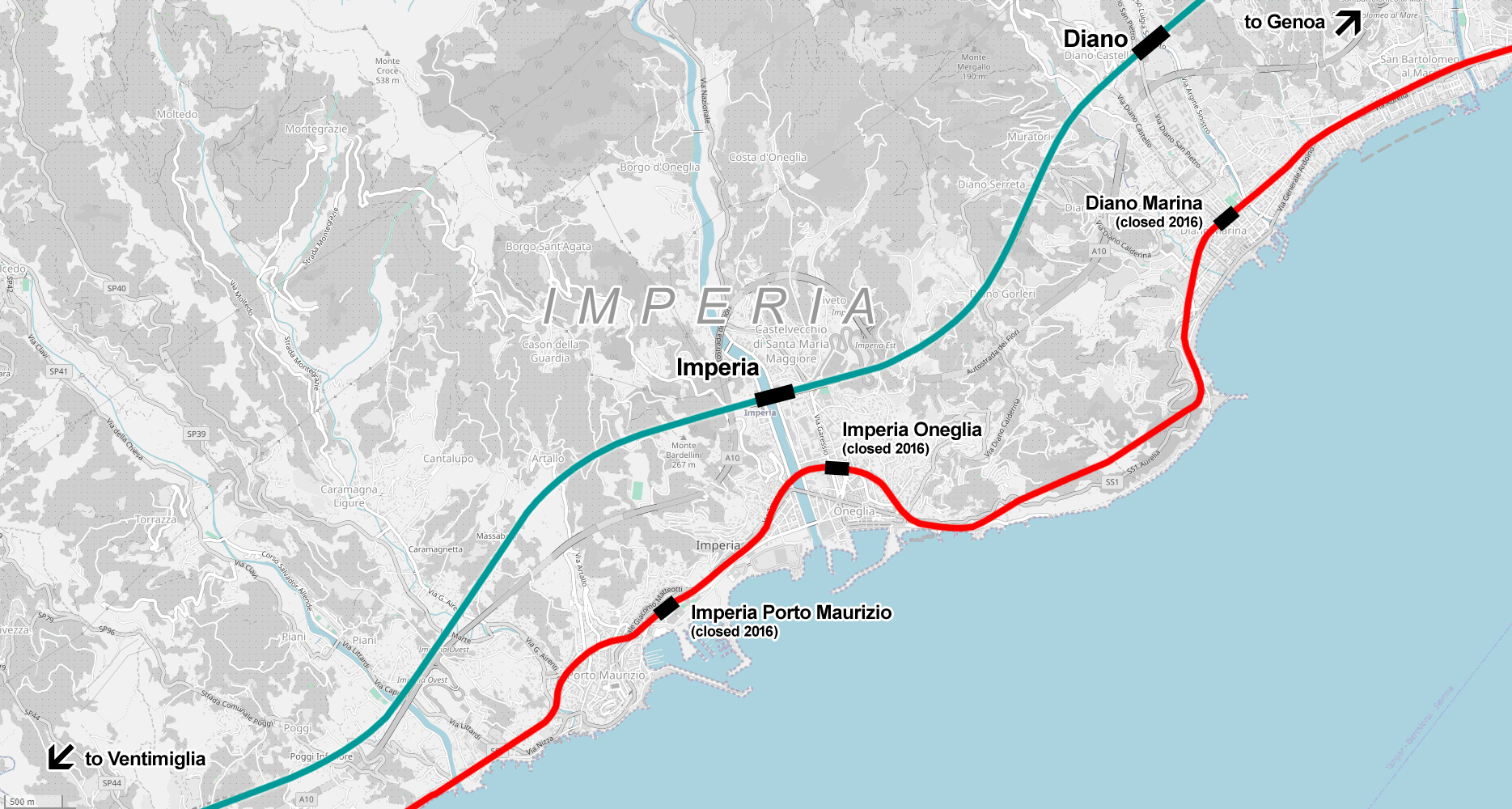
The old and new lines of the Genoa–Ventimiglia railway that pass through Imperia

== Interchange ==
In the square in front of the station, there were bus stops for the following lines:

- Sanremo-Andora (public transport by Riviera Trasporti);
- Imperia's urban service.

There was also a taxi rank in the square.

== See also ==
- History of rail transport in Italy
- List of railway stations in Liguria
- Rail transport in Italy
- Railway stations in Italy
