= Grock =

Swiss clown (1880–1959)

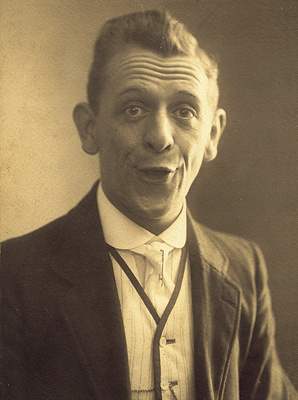
- Grock in 1903
- Born: Charles Adrien Wettach; 10 January 1880; Loveresse, Canton of Bern, Switzerland
- Died: 14 July 1959 (aged 79); Imperia, Italy
- Occupations: Clown, music hall performer
- Years active: 1890s–1954

Signature
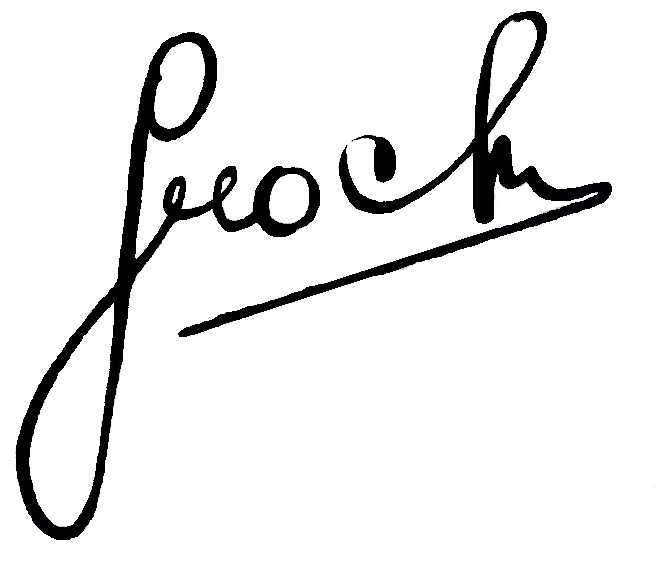

Grock (born Charles Adrien Wettach; 10 January 1880 – 14 July 1959) was a Swiss clown. Called "the king of clowns" and "the greatest of Europe's clowns", Grock was once the most highly paid entertainer in Europe.

== Biography ==
=== Early life ===
Grock was born in Loveresse, a village in the Bernese Jura in the Canton of Bern. He started early as a performer, learning musicianship and acrobatic skills from his father. When a caravan of Roma passed through, he joined them, learning more instruments and gaining confidence with them. In 1894, he debuted with Fiame Wetzel's travelling circus. He became a clown, working first with another performer named Brick in 1903, adopting the name "Grock," and then going on to partner with the famous clown Antonet (Umberto Guillaum). This second act was developed with the aim of making the transition from circus to music hall stages, which were more lucrative. While not initially successful, Antonet and Grock did manage to secure a London engagement in 1911. Refining their performances according to audience response, Grock came to dominate the act, and they eventually split up.

=== Career and later life ===
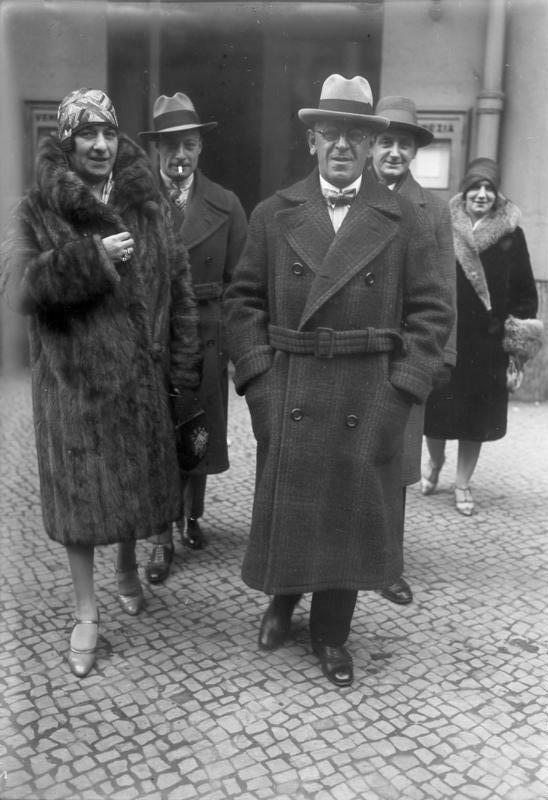
Grock with wife, Berlin 1930

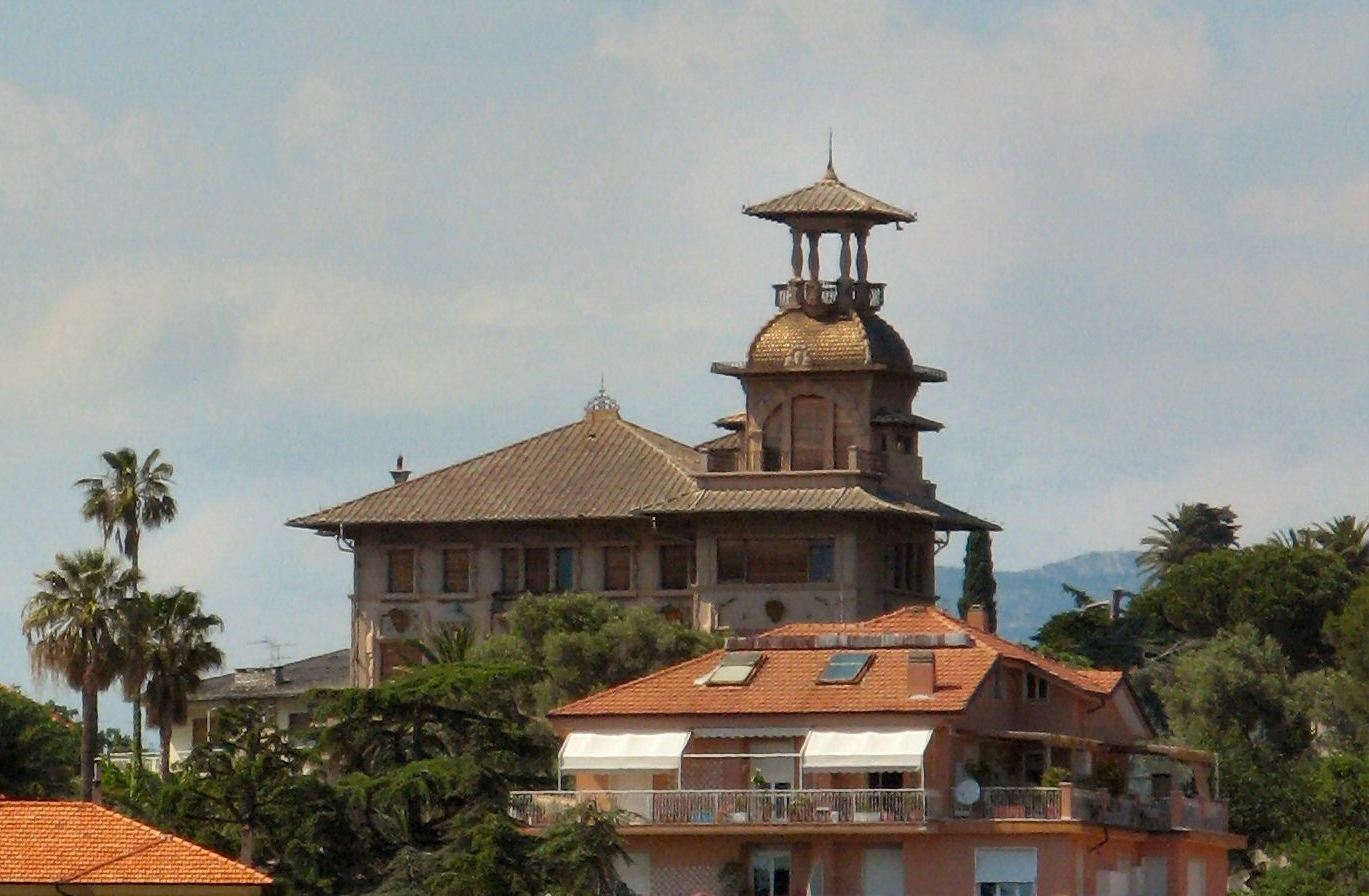
Villa Grock in 2007

By 1913, Grock's fame had spread, his act having developed into the mixture of pantomime and musical blunders for which he is now remembered. With the outbreak of World War I, he made Britain his base, remaining there until 1924, when he returned to continental Europe. He performed throughout Europe and in the United States, commanding ever higher fees, and his continuing success enabled him to establish his own circus in 1951, with which he toured until his final performance in Hamburg on 30 October 1954.

He retired to the Villa Bianca (now named Villa Grock), a 50-room house he had constructed for him in the 1920s in Imperia, Italy, where he died in 1959.

=== Media ===
Some of Grock's performances have been preserved on film. He made the 1927 silent movie What For?, and French and German language versions of Grock in 1931. A biopic, Au revoir, M. Grock (1950), featured Grock as himself, with Adrien Osperi and Ted Rémy playing Grock as a boy and young man, respectively.

In retirement, he made some appearances on Italian television. He also wrote several books, including an autobiography.

== Legacy ==
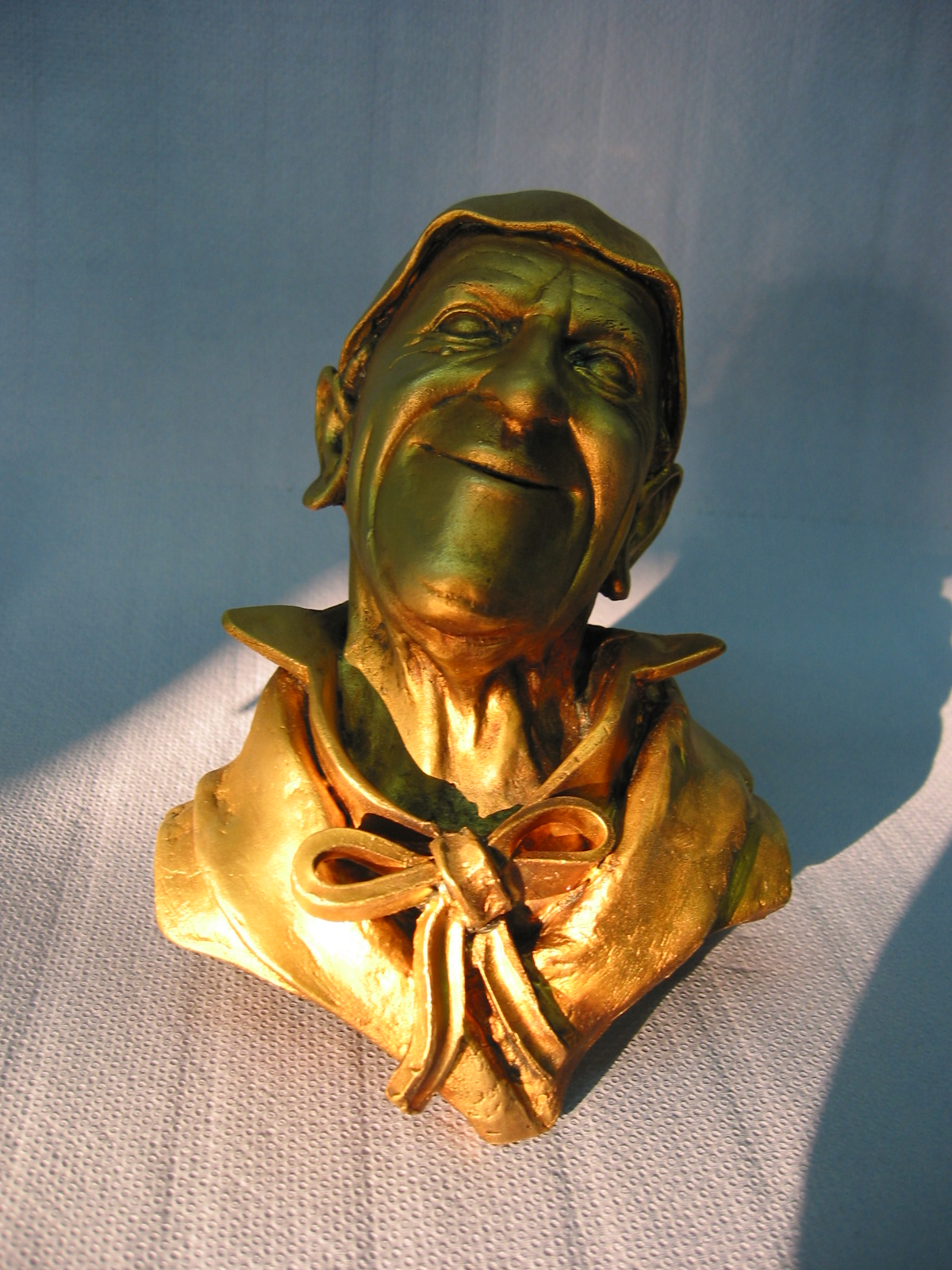
The Grock d'Or statuette

Grock's career is commemorated with the Grock d'Or, an annual competition for young circus artists which first took place in 2003. This competition has been discontinued since 2008.

== Filmography ==
- Grock – son premier film (1926)
- Grock (1931), German drama directed by Carl Boese
  - Grock (La vie d'un grand artiste) (1931), French version of the German film directed by Carl Boese and Joë Hamman, three other language versions have been produced
- A 1939 revue film produced by Hohner
- Farewell Mister Grock (1950)
- Grocks letzter Auftritt / Le dernier spectacle de Grock (1954)
- Fünf Sequenzen aus Grocks Programm (1957)
- Grock – König hinter der Maske (1965)
- Grock – König der Clowns (2003)

== Books ==
- Grock. Nit mö-ö-ö-glich. Die Memoiren des Königs der Clowns, autobiography (1956) (in German); English version: Grock, King of Clowns (1957)

== Additional references ==
- Law, M. D., ed. (1950). "Grock". Chambers's Encyclopaedia. George Newnes. p. 600.
- "Grock". www.steffi-line.de (in German).
