= Imperia Oneglia railway station =

Railway station in Italy

Imperia Oneglia
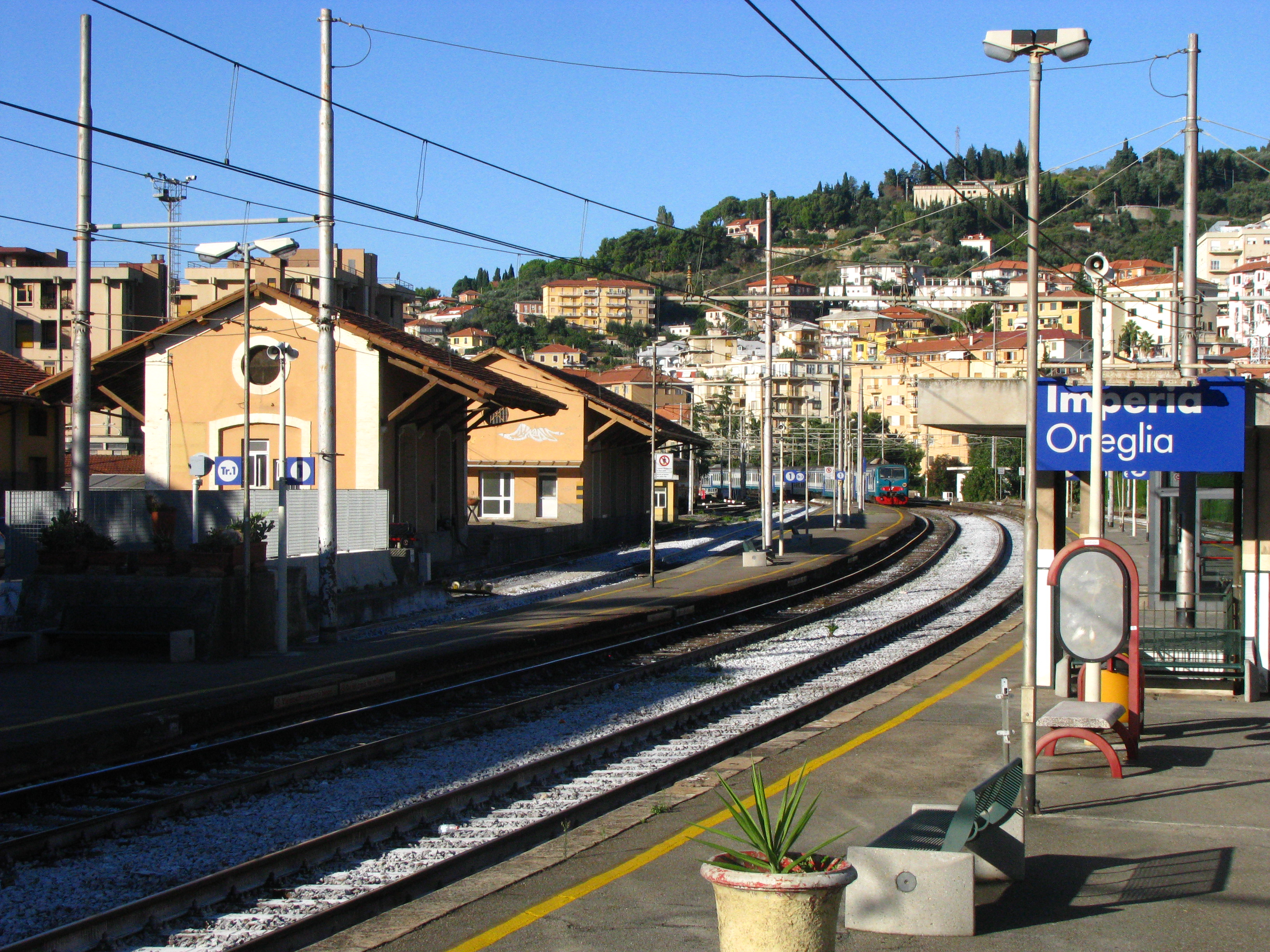
- Imperia Oneglia railway station.

General information
- Location: Imperia, Imperia, Liguria; Italy
- Coordinates: 43°53′32″N 08°02′21″E
- Operator: Rete Ferroviaria Italiana
- Line: Genoa–Ventimiglia railway
- Distance: 106.838 km (66.386 mi) from Genova Piazza Principe
- Platforms: 3
- Tracks: 4 + sidings
- Train operators: Trenitalia

History
- Opened: 1872; 154 years ago
- Closed: 11 December 2016; 9 years ago
Location
- Location within Liguria Location within Northern Italy Location within Italy

Imperia Oneglia railway station (Italian: Stazione di Imperia Oneglia) served the city of Imperia, in the Liguria region, northwestern Italy. Opened in 1872, it formed part of the Genoa–Ventimiglia railway, and was situated just over two thirds along the way from Genoa towards Ventimiglia. It was replaced on 11 December 2016, along with Imperia's other former railway station, Imperia Porto Maurizio, 2.2 kilometres (1.4 mi) to the west, by a new station, simply named Imperia, situated on a new double-track line replacing the old coastal route.

== Train services ==
The station was last served by the following service(s):

- Regional services (Treno regionale) Ventimiglia - Savona - Genoa - Sestri Levante - La Spezia - San Stefano di Magra
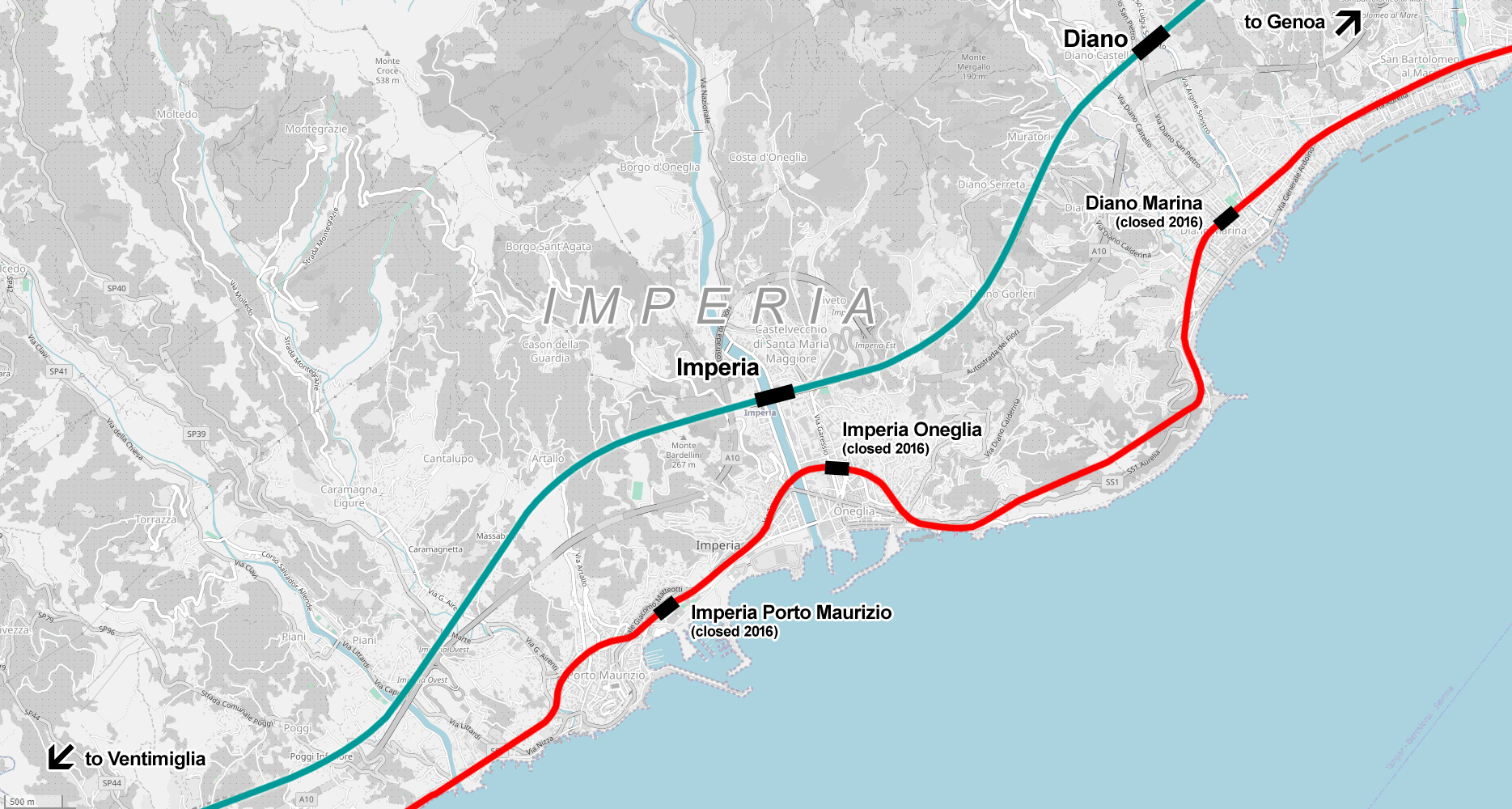
The old and new lines of the Genoa–Ventimiglia railway that pass through Imperia

== See also ==
- History of rail transport in Italy
- List of railway stations in Liguria
- Rail transport in Italy
- Railway stations in Italy
