= Imperia =

Imperia Inpêia (Ligurian)
- Comune
- Città di Imperia
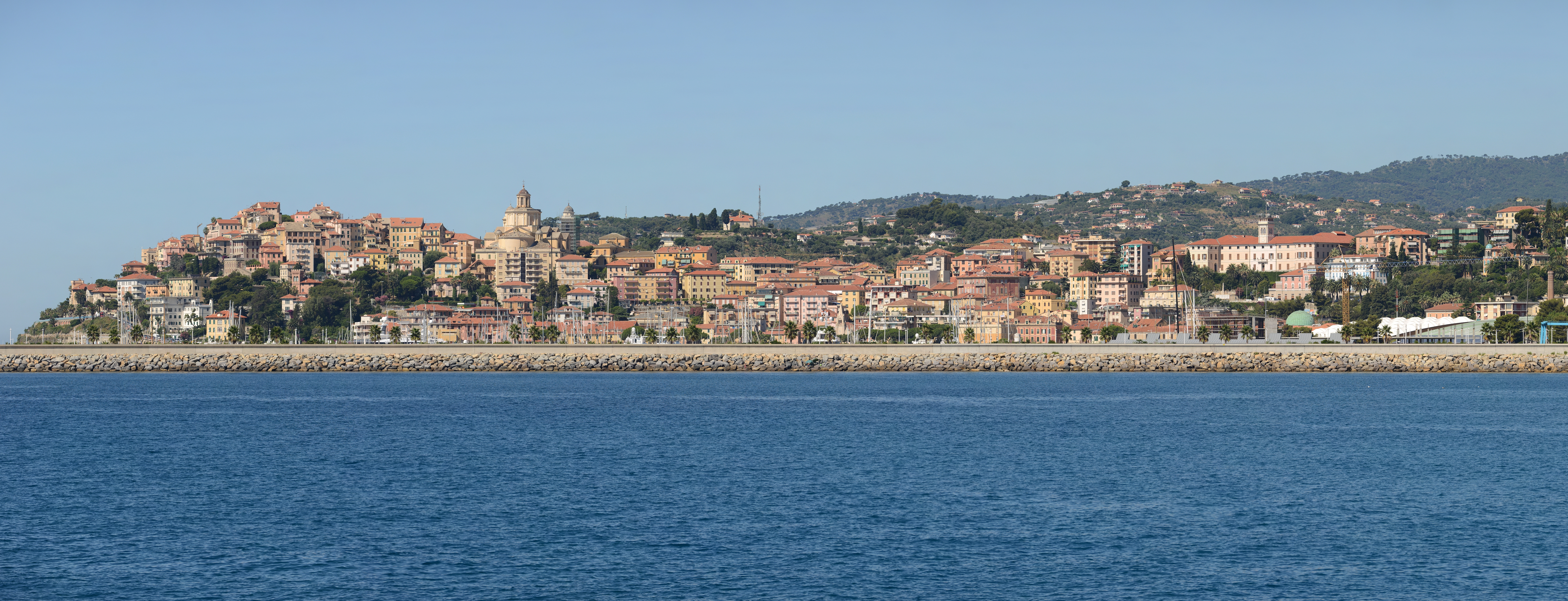
- Panorama of Imperia

- Flag Coat of arms

- Location within Italy Location within Liguria
- Coordinates: 43°53′N 8°2′E
- Country: Italy
- Region: Liguria
- Province: Imperia (IM)
- Frazioni: Artallo, Borgo d'Oneglia, Cantalupo, Caramagna, Castelvecchio, Clavi, Costa d'Oneglia, Massabovi, Moltedo, Montegrazie, Oliveto, Piani, Poggi, Sant'Agata

Government
  - Mayor: Claudio Scajola

Area
  - Total: 45.95 km^{2} (17.74 sq mi)
- Elevation: 10 m (33 ft)

Population (31 August 2017)
  - Total: 42,328
  - Density: 921.2/km^{2} (2,386/sq mi)
- Demonym: Imperiesi
- Time zone: UTC+1 (CET)
  - Summer (DST): UTC+2 (CEST)
- Postal code: 18100
- Dialing code: 0183
- Patron saint: Leonard of Port Maurice, Saint John (Oneglia)
- Saint day: 26 November
- Website: Official website

Imperia (pronounced [imˈpɛːrja]; Ligurian: Inpêia [iŋˈpeːja] or Inpéria) is a coastal city and comune in the region of Liguria, Italy. It is the capital of the Province of Imperia, and historically it was capital of the Intemelia district of Liguria. Benito Mussolini created the city of Imperia on 21 October 1923 by combining Porto Maurizio and Oneglia, as well as the surrounding village communes of Piani, Caramagna Ligure, Castelvecchio di Santa Maria Maggiore, Borgo Sant'Agata, Costa d'Oneglia, Poggi, Torrazza, Moltedo and Montegrazie.

Imperia is well known for the cultivation of flowers and olives, and is a popular summer destination for visitors. The local Piscina Felice Cascione indoor pool has hosted numerous national and international aquatics events.

== History ==
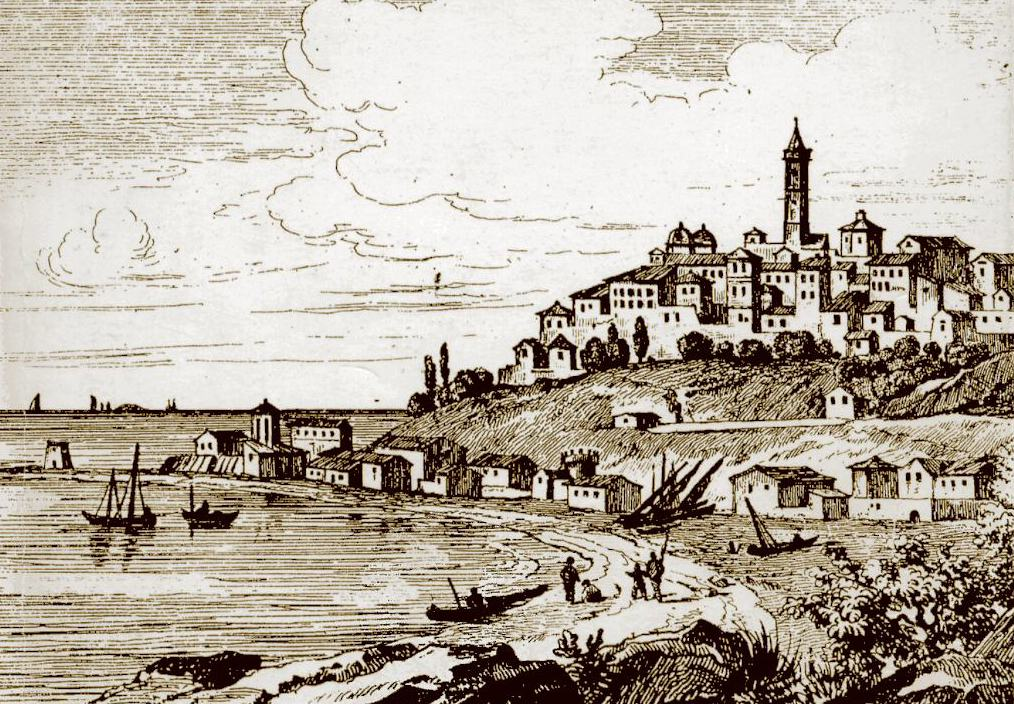
A representation of Porto Maurizio in the early 1800s

The name of Oneglia may have its roots in the pre-Roman settlement of Pagus Unelia, on the hill of Castelvecchio, which was probably one of the sex oppida of the Liguri. This spawned Ripa Uneliae, a village down on the coast probably on the site of the modern-day Borgo Peri. Modern Oneglia became established on its modern site around 935AD, possibly after it was destroyed by the Saracens; in 1100 it became a fief of the Diocese of Albenga. In 1298 Oneglia became part of the fiefdom of the Doria family of Genoa; the famous admiral Andrea Doria (1466–1560) was born in the town. The Dorias sold the town to Emmanuel Philibert, Duke of Savoy in 1576, and Oneglia essentially remained a Savoyard enclave in the Republic of Genoa until Italian unification. Nonetheless, it was on the front line in the wars of the House of Savoy; it was seized in 1614 and 1649 by the Spaniards and in 1623 and 1672 by the Genoese. In 1692 it had to repulse an attack by a French squadron; in 1744–45 it was again occupied by the Spaniards, and in 1792 bombarded and burned by the French.

Porto Maurizio was a Roman settlement, Portus Maurici, which, though named in the brief maritime itinerary appended to the Antonine Itinerary, must be an interpolation in manuscripts of that third century document, since it is named after Saint Maurice, leader of the Theban Legion who were not martyred until 286 and could not have been memorialized until the Christianized Empire of the fourth century. It became a Byzantine port after the Gothic Wars of the 6th century, then passed to the Order of Saint Benedict. It was subject to the counts of Turin in the 11th century, and then to the marchesi of Clavesana. Boniface of Clavesana sold the town to the Republic of Genoa in 1288 in return for a yearly payment, as part of Genoa's expansion into western Liguria. In 1354 it became the seat of the Genoese vicar of the western Riviera. The town prospered even though control of Genoa passed between the French, the Duchy of Milan, and the Spanish. During the Napoleonic Wars Napoleon Bonaparte himself stopped for a night in Porto Maurizio and spent the night on the Parrasio on the third floor of Palazzo Lavagna. At the Congress of Vienna in 1815, it was awarded to the Kingdom of Sardinia, before finally joining a united Italy in 1861.

Mussolini created the city of Imperia on 21 October 1923 by the union of Porto Maurizio and Oneglia and the surrounding village communes of Piani, Caramagna Ligure, Castelvecchio di Santa Maria Maggiore, Borgo Sant'Agata, Costa d'Oneglia, Poggi, Torrazza, Moltedo and Montegrazie.

== Economy ==
The economy of Imperia is based on tourism, food industry (olive oil and pasta), a specialized agriculture (olive groves and flowers in greenhouses) and on trading and harbour activities. The seaside tourism represents an important aspect of the economy of Imperia.

== Geography ==
Imperia consists of the two historical districts of Porto Maurizio and Oneglia, which lie on either side of the River Impero that gives its name to the city.

Porto Maurizio is situated on a peninsula to the west of the river, stretching along the coastline. It is the wealthiest and most colorful district of the city, threaded by narrow lanes known as carrugi, and its economy centers on the tourist industry. It was a possession of Genoa from the 13th century.

Oneglia (Inéja in Ligurian) lies on an alluvial plain to the east of the Impero, and with its working port is the most modern and industrialized of the two districts. At its centre lies Dante Square, from which radiate some of the main roads of the city.

=== Climate ===
Imperia experiences a Mediterranean climate (Köppen climate classification Csa).

Climate data for Imperia (1981–2010)
Month	Jan	Feb	Mar	Apr	May	Jun	Jul	Aug	Sep	Oct	Nov	Dec	Year
Mean daily maximum °C (°F)	12.8 (55.0)	12.8 (55.0)	14.7 (58.5)	16.6 (61.9)	20.5 (68.9)	23.8 (74.8)	26.7 (80.1)	27.2 (81.0)	24.2 (75.6)	20.6 (69.1)	16.3 (61.3)	13.8 (56.8)	19.2 (66.5)
Daily mean °C (°F)	10.1 (50.2)	9.9 (49.8)	11.9 (53.4)	13.9 (57.0)	17.7 (63.9)	20.9 (69.6)	23.8 (74.8)	24.3 (75.7)	21.2 (70.2)	17.9 (64.2)	13.6 (56.5)	11.2 (52.2)	16.4 (61.5)
Mean daily minimum °C (°F)	7.4 (45.3)	7.2 (45.0)	9.1 (48.4)	11.1 (52.0)	14.8 (58.6)	18.0 (64.4)	20.8 (69.4)	21.3 (70.3)	18.3 (64.9)	15.2 (59.4)	10.9 (51.6)	8.6 (47.5)	13.6 (56.4)
Average precipitation mm (inches)	83 (3.3)	91 (3.6)	85 (3.3)	63 (2.5)	50 (2.0)	32 (1.3)	14 (0.6)	31 (1.2)	54 (2.1)	86 (3.4)	119 (4.7)	88 (3.5)	796 (31.5)
Average precipitation days (≥ 1.0 mm)	6	5	6	5	6	4	2	3	4	6	8	5	60
Source 1: Istituto Superiore per la Protezione e la Ricerca Ambientale (precipitation 1951–1980)
Source 2: Climi e viaggi (precipitation days)

== Notable sights ==
=== Porto Maurizio ===
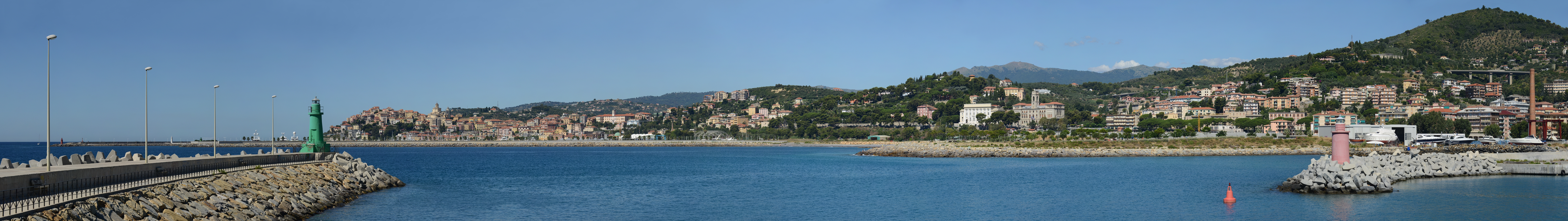
View of Porto Maurizio from the harbour of westernmost Oneglia

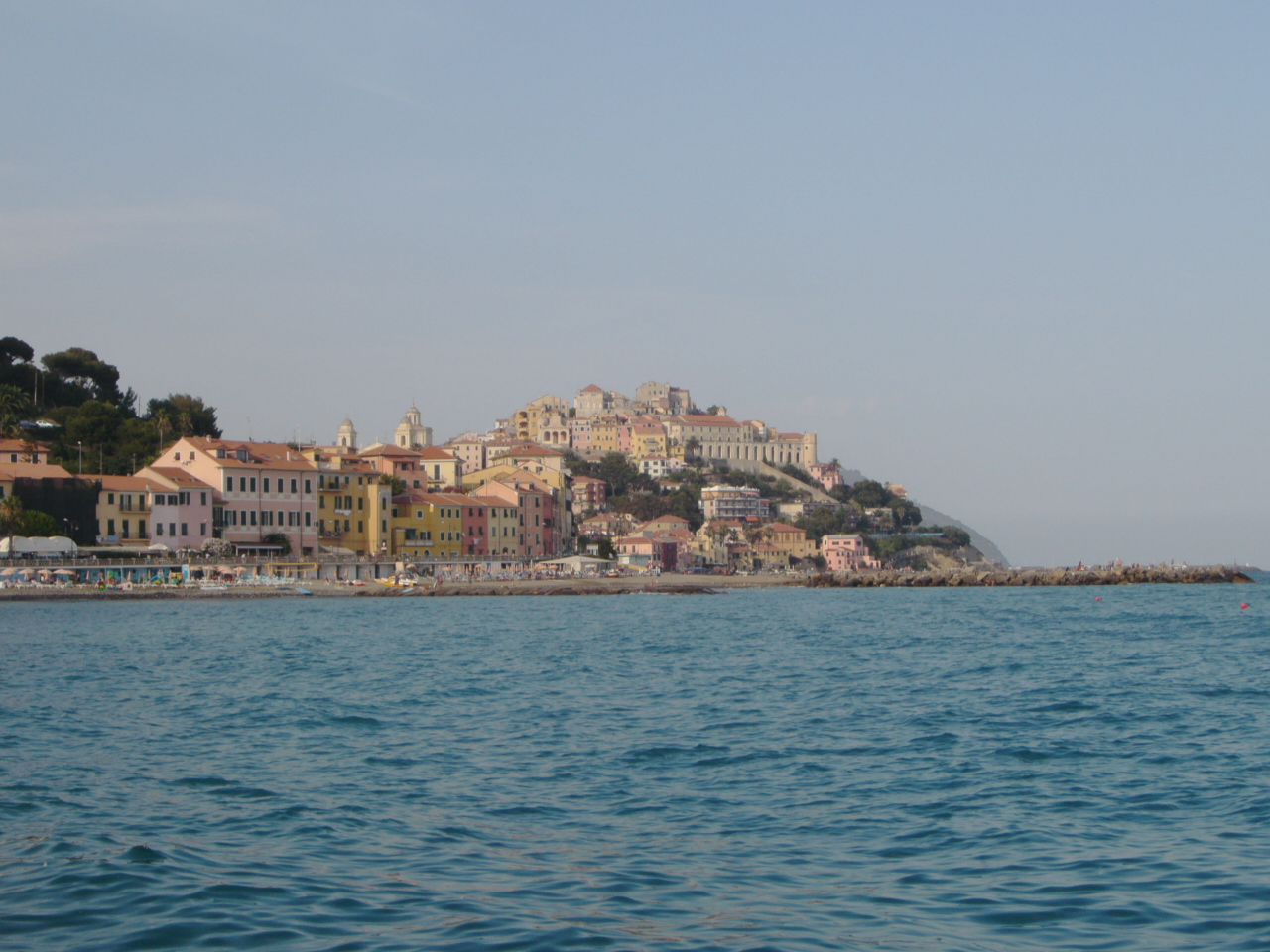
Porto Maurizio

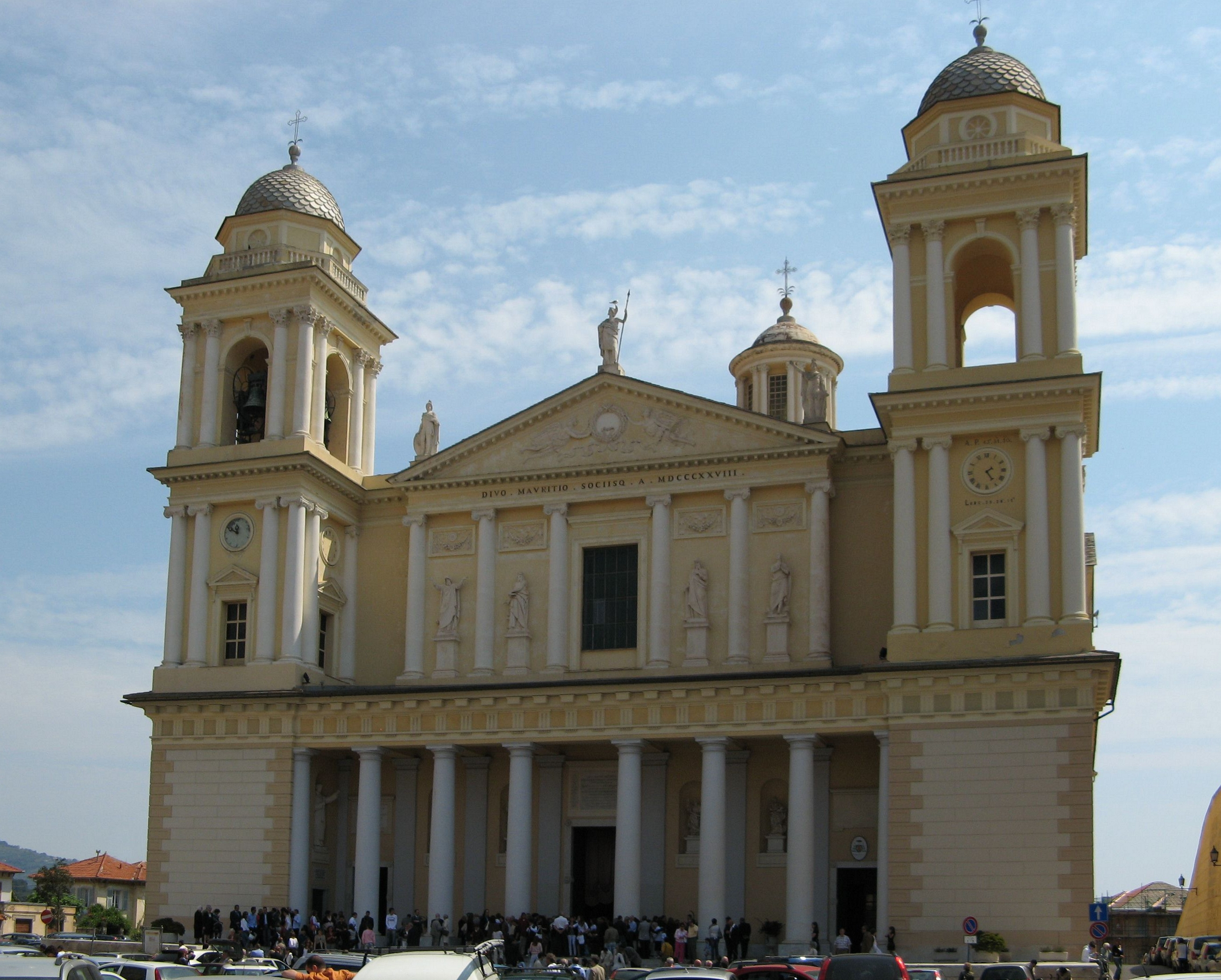
Cathedral San Maurizio

- Cathedral of San Maurizio, built between 1781 and 1832 by Gaetano Canton, the largest church in Liguria
- Old Town, called Parasio
- Convent of Santa Chiara, first established in 1365, the existing structure dates from 1741
- There is a small Naval Museum in the town

=== Oneglia ===
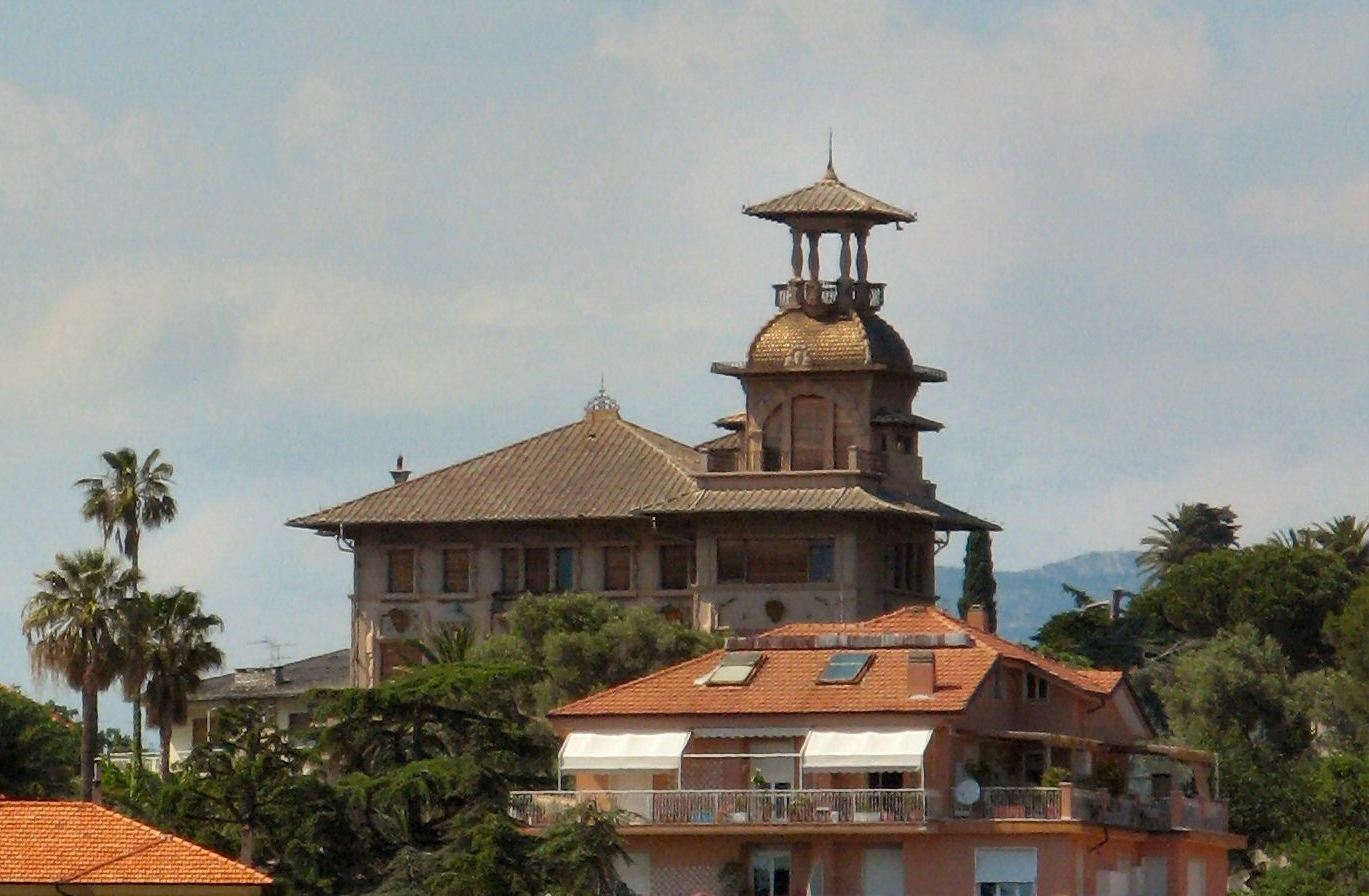
Villa Grock

- Museo dell' Olivo (The Museum of the Olive)
- Villa Grock, built for the clown Grock (1880–1959)
- Church of San Giovanni Battista, built in 1739–62.
- Calata Giovanni Battista Cuneo, a historic quay lined with restaurants
- The historic Palazzo Municipale in Piazza Danta.

=== Montegrazie ===
- Church of Santa Maria Maggiore
- Shrine of Nostra Signora delle Grazie

== Transport ==
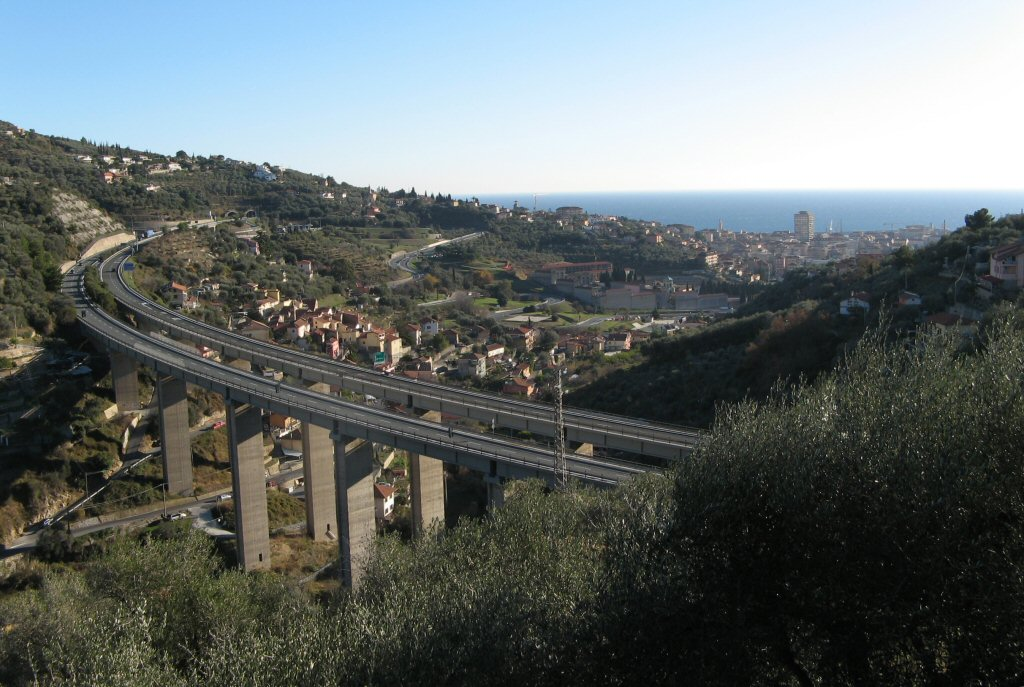
Autostrada dei Fiori (A10), crossing the valley above Oneglia

Imperia is served by the Autostrada A10 motorway, also known as L'Autostrada dei Fiori which runs along the Ligurian coast between Genoa and Ventimiglia on the French border. The road crosses the city via a series of high viaducts and mountain tunnels over the valley. Two junctions serve the city, one in the west close to Porto Maurizio, and another in the east above Oneglia. The A10 also forms part of European route E80.

Bus services across the Province of Imperia are operated by the public transport body Riviera Trasporti (RT).

The Genoa–Ventimiglia railway line runs through Imperia: the city is served by a central Imperia railway station, on a double-track route opened on 11 December 2016, replacing the old narrow coastal route confined by the sea and long tunnels under the rocky coastline, and therefore built as a single-track railway. The old route was originally built in 1872 and closed with the opening of the new inland route; the city was served by two railway stations serving the two centres of Imperia, Imperia Porto Maurizio and Imperia Oneglia railway station.

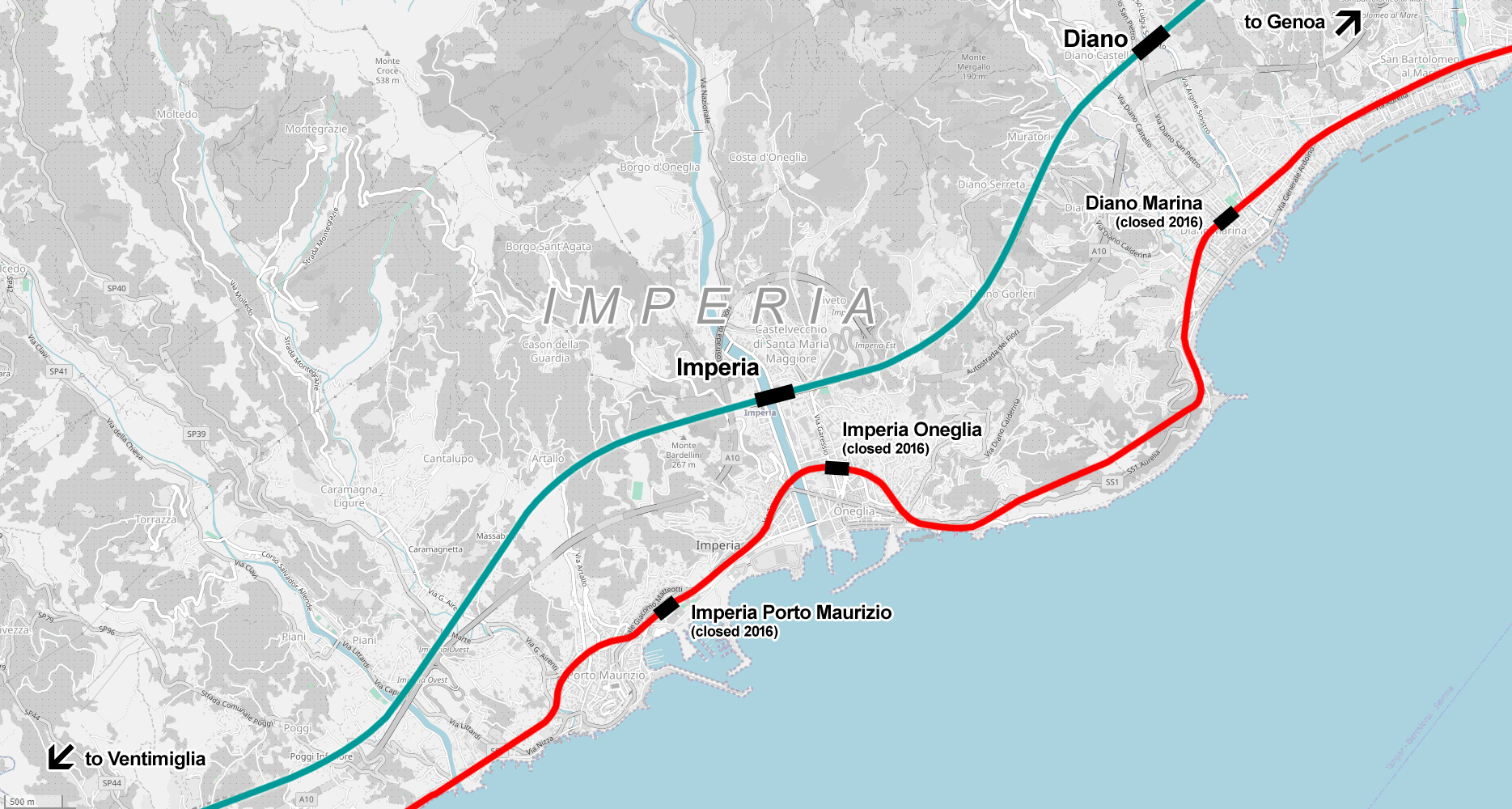
Old and new lines of the Genoa–Ventimiglia railway

== Famous residents ==
Natives of Imperia:

- Gaetano Amadeo (1824–1893), organist and composer
- Edmondo de Amicis (1846–1908), writer and journalist
- Carlo Amoretti (1741–1816), ecclesiastic and writer
- Maria Amoretti (1756–1787), lawyer
- Pellegrino Amoretti, assistant secretary to Charles V, Holy Roman Emperor
- Domingo Belgrano (1730–1795), politician
- Luciano Berio (1925–2003), composer
- Andrea Doria (1466–1560), statesman and admiral
- Renato Dulbecco (1914–2012), Italian–American virologist and Nobel Prize winner
- Luca Fiuzzi (1984), football player
- Saint Leonard of Port Maurice
- Francesco Moraldo, "Creppo di Triora" (1906–2001), Righteous Among the Nations in 1999
- Alessandro Natta (1918–2001), politician
- Giulio Natta (1903–1979), chemist and Nobel Prize winner in 1963
- Giovan Pietro Vieusseux (1779–1863), writer and publisher it:Giovan Pietro Vieusseux

Others:

- Grock (1880–1959), entertainer

== International relations ==
=== Twin towns – Sister cities ===
Imperia is twinned with:

- Friedrichshafen, Germany
- Rosario, Argentina
- Newport, Rhode Island, United States
