= Timeline of women in science =

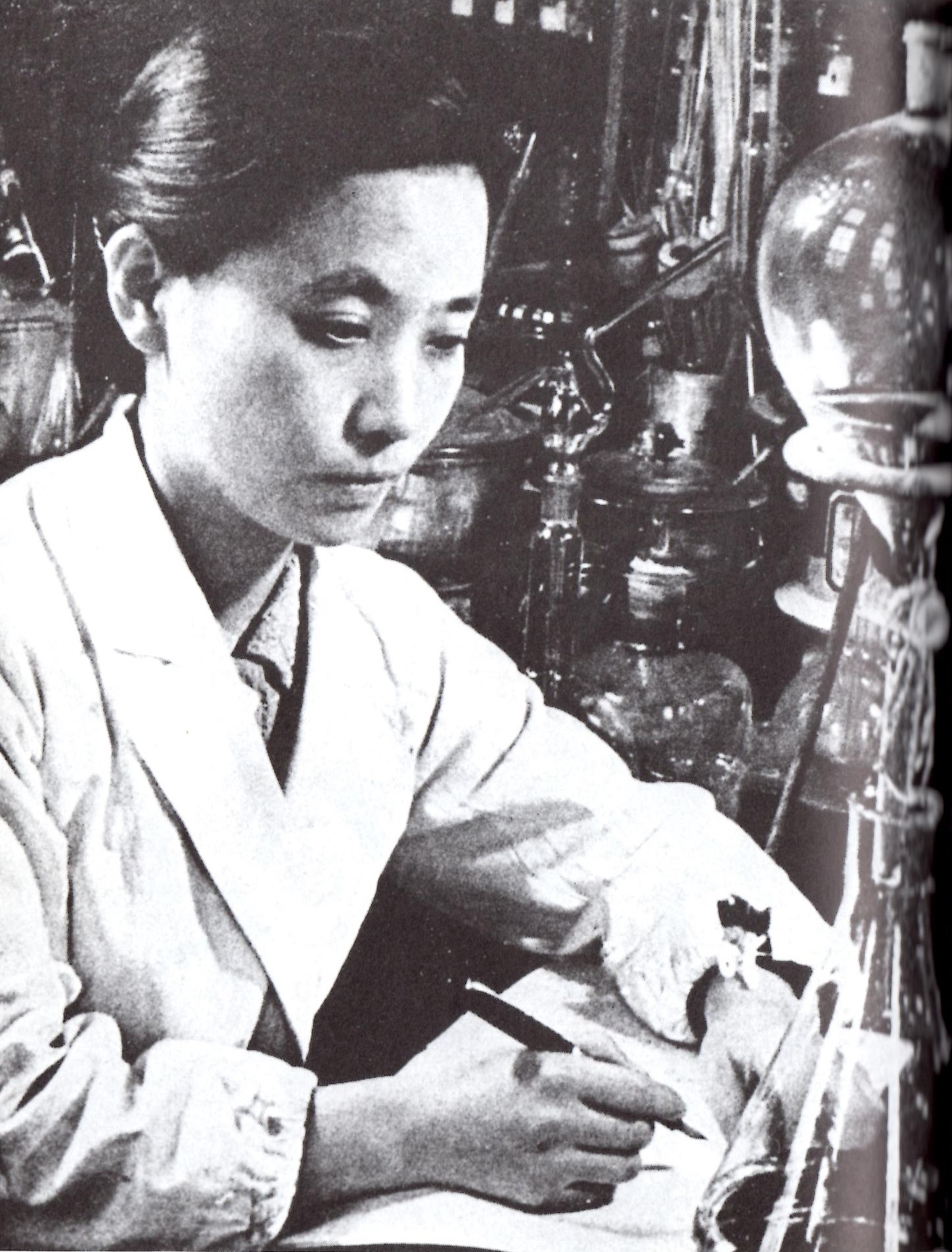
"A Female Scientist", in Women's Illustrated, Japan, 1939

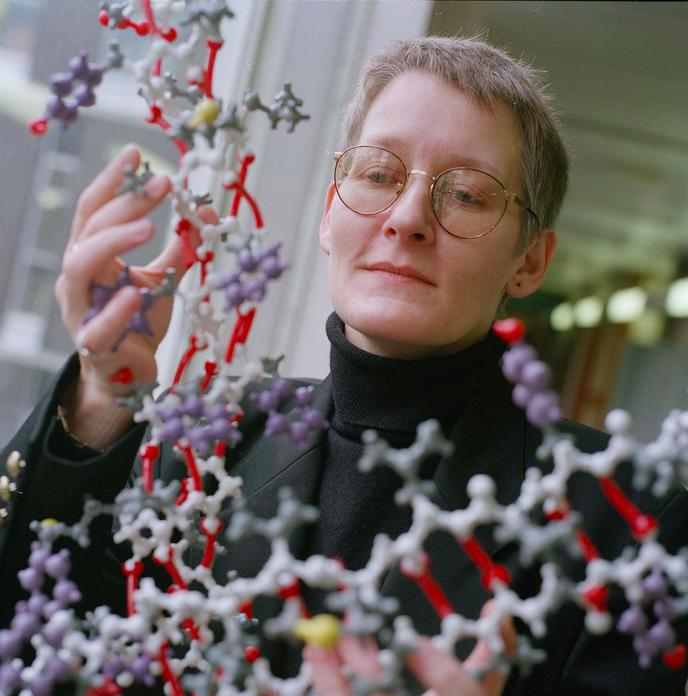
Teresa K. Attwood, professor of bioinformatics

This is a timeline of women in science, spanning from ancient history up to the 21st century. While the timeline primarily focuses on women involved with natural sciences such as astronomy, biology, chemistry, and physics, it also includes women from the social sciences (e.g. sociology, psychology), and the formal sciences (e.g. mathematics, computer science), as well as notable science educators and medical scientists. The chronological events listed in the timeline relate to both scientific achievements and gender equality within the sciences.

== Ancient history ==
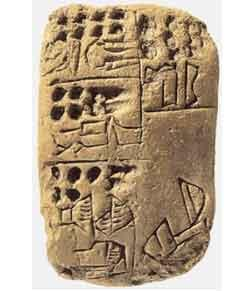
The Tapputi Belatekallim tablet

- 1900 BCE: Aganice, also known as Athyrta, was an Egyptian princess during the Middle Kingdom (about 2000–1700 BCE) working on astronomy and natural philosophy.
- c. 1505–1458 BCE: Hatshepsut, also known as the Queen Doctor, promoted a botanical expedition searching for officinal plants.
- 1200 BCE: The Mesopotamian perfume-maker Tapputi-Belatekallim was referenced in the text of a cuneiform tablet. She is often considered the world's first recorded chemist.
- 500 BCE: Theano was a Pythagorean philosopher.
- c. 150 BCE: Aglaonice became the first female astronomer to be recorded in Ancient Greece.
- 1st century BCE: A woman known only as Fang became the earliest recorded Chinese female alchemist. She is credited with "the discovery of how to turn mercury into silver" – possibly the chemical process of boiling off mercury in order to extract pure silver residue from ores.
- 1st century CE: Mary the Jewess was among the world's first alchemists.
- 3rd century CE: Cleopatra the Alchemist, an early figure in chemistry and practical alchemy, is credited as inventing the alembic.
- c. 300–350 CE: Greek mathematician Pandrosion develops a numerical approximation for cube roots.
- c. 350–415 CE: Greek astronomer, mathematician and philosopher Hypatia became renowned as a respected academic teacher, commentator on mathematics, and head of her own science academy.

== Middle Ages ==
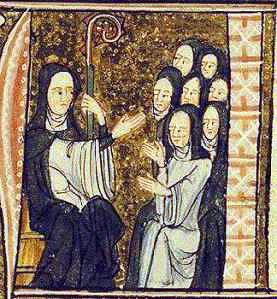
Hildegard of Bingen and her nuns

- c. 620: Rufaida Al-Aslamia, Was recognized as the first Muslim nurse in history.
- c. 975: Chinese alchemist Keng Hsien-Seng was employed by the Royal Court. She distilled perfumes, utilized an early form of the Soxhlet process to extract camphor into alcohol, and gained recognition for her skill in using mercury to extract silver from ores.
- 10th century: Syrian scientist, mathematician, and astronomer Al-ʻIjliyyah manufactured astrolabes for the court of Sayf al-Dawla in Aleppo.
- 11th century: Li Shao Yun, Chinese chemist.
- 11th century: Zhang Xiaoniang, Chinese physician.
- c. 1098–1179: Hildegard of Bingen was a founder of scientific natural history in Germany.
- fl. 1119–1182: Sun Bu'er, Chinese chemist.
- fl. 1122–1131: Dobrodeia of Kiev, a Rus' princess and Empress of the Eastern Roman Empire, was the first woman to write a treatise on medicine.
- 1159: Alsatian nun Herrad of Landsberg (1130–1195) compiled the scientific compendium Hortus deliciarum.
- fl. 1176: Helvidis, French physician.
- fl. 1200: Rebecca Guarna, Italian physician and was known as one of the "Women of Salerno".
- Early 12th century: The Italian medical practitioner Trota of Salerno compiled medical works on women's ailments and skin diseases.
- 12th century: Adelle of the Saracens taught at the Salerno School of Medicine.
- fl. 1249–1259: Magistra Hersend, French surgeon.
- fl. 1265 Stephanie de Lyon, French physician.
- fl. 1291 Théophanie, French barber surgeon.
- fl. 1292 Denice, French barber-surgeon.
- fl. 1292 Isabiau la Mergesse, French-Jewish physician.
- fl. ca. 13th century Demud, German physician.
- fl. 1292–1319: Dame Péronelle, French herbalist.
- 13th century Shen Yu Hsiu, Chinese chemist.
- fl. 1300 Gilette de Narbonne, French physician. Giovanni Boccaccio wrote of her in ‘’The Decameron’’, calling her ‘Donna Medica’; Alfred Duru and Henri Chivot wrote a comic opera about her called Gillette de Narbonne.
- f. 1307 Trotta da Toya, Napolitan physician.
- fl. 1308 Francisca di Vestis, Napolian physician.
- fl. 1309 Maria Gallicia, licensed surgeon.
- fl. 1313–1325: Ameline la Miresse, French physician.
- fl. 1318–1324: Adelmota of Carrara was a physician in Padua, Italy.
- 1320: Raymunda da Taberna, licensed Napolitan surgeon.
- fl. 1322: Fava of Manosque, French-Jewish physician.
- fl. 1322: Jacobina Félicie, Italian physician.
- fl. 1326: Sara de Sancto Aegidio, French physician.
- fl. 1326: Sarah de St Giles, French-Jewish physician and medical teacher.
- fl. 1333: Constanza, Italian surgeon, mentioned in Pope Sixtus IV edict regarding physicians and surgeons.
- fl. 1333: Francisca da Romana, Napolitan physician.
- fl. 1333: Isabella da Ocre, Napolitan surgeon.
- fl. 1333: Lauretta Ponte da Saracena Calabria, Napolitan physician.
- fl. 1333: Margarita da Venosa, licensed Napolitan surgeon, who studied at the University of Salerno She was considered a noteworthy practitioner and counted Ladislaus, king of Naples, as a patient.
- fl. 1333: Maria Incarnata, Italian surgeon, mentioned in Pope Sixtus IV edict regarding physicians and surgeons.
- fl. 1333: Sibyl of Benevento, Napolitan physician specializing in the plague buboes
- fl. 1333: Thomasia de Mattio, Italian physician, mentioned in Pope Sixtus IV edict regarding physicians and surgeons.
- fl. 1335: Polisena da Troya, licensed Neapolitan surgeon.
- d. 1366: Jeanne d'Ausshure, French surgeon.
- fl. 1374: Floreta La-Noga, Aragonese physician.
- fl. 1376: Virdimura of Catania, Jewish-Sicilian physician.
- fl. 1380: Bellayne Gallipapa, Zaragoza, Aragonese-Jewish physician.
- fl. 1384: Dolcich Gallipapa, Lleida, Catalan-Jewish physician.
- fl. 1384: Juana Sarrovia, Barcelona, Catalan physician.
- fl. 1387: Na Pla Gallipapa, Zaragoza, Aragonese-Jewish physician.
- late 13th century: Margherita di Napoli, Napolitan oculist active in Frankfurt-am-Main.
- fl. 1390: Dorotea Bucca, Italian professor of medicine.
- 1386–1408: Maesta Antonia, Florentine physician.
- 14th century: Abella, Italian physician.
- 14th century: Mercuriade, Italian physician and surgeon.
- fl. 1400: Antonia Daniello, Florentine-Jewish physician.
- fl. 13th century: Brunetta de Siena, Italian-Jewish physician.
- fl. 13th century: Caterina of Florence, Florentine physician.
- fl. 1411: Peretta Peronne, also called Perretta Petone, French surgeon.
- fl. 1415: Constance Calenda, Italian surgeon specializing in diseases of the eye.
- fl. 1438: Jeanne de Cusey, French barber-surgeon.
- fl. 1460: Marguerite Saluzzi, Napolitan licensed herbalist physician.
- fl. 1479: Guillemette du Luys, French royal surgeon.
- d. 1498: Gentile Budrioli (or Gentile Cimieri), Italian astrologer and herbalist.
- 15th century: Clarice di Durisio, Italian physician.
- 15th century Francesca, muller de Berenguer Satorra, Catalan physician.
- c. 1494–1526: Katherine Briçonnet French architect.

== 16th century ==
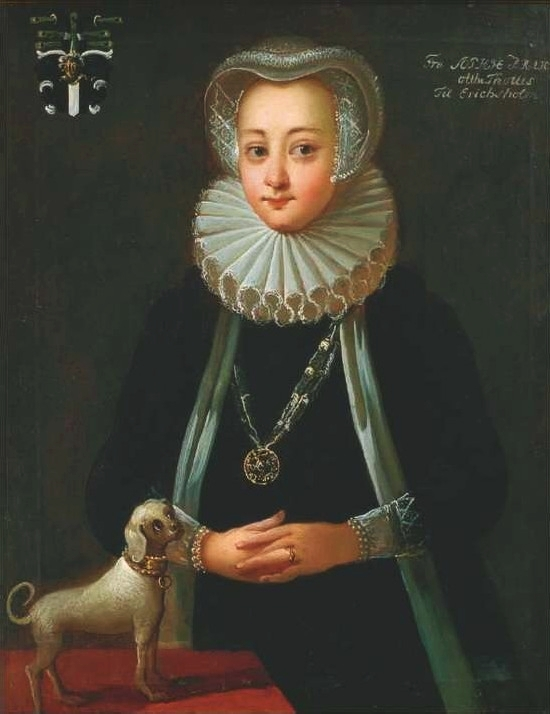
Danish scientist Sophia Brahe

- 1561: Italian alchemist Isabella Cortese published her popular book The Secrets of Lady Isabella Cortese. The work included recipes for medicines, distilled oils and cosmetics, and was the only book published by a female alchemist in the 16th century.
- 1572: Italian botanist Loredana Marcello died from the plague – but not before developing several effective palliative formulas for plague sufferers, which were used by many physicians.
- 1572: Danish scientist Sophia Brahe (1556–1643) assisted her brother Tycho Brahe with his astronomical observations.
- 1590: After her husband's death, Caterina Vitale took over his position as chief pharmacist to the Order of St John, becoming the first female chemist and pharmacist in Malta.

== 17th century ==
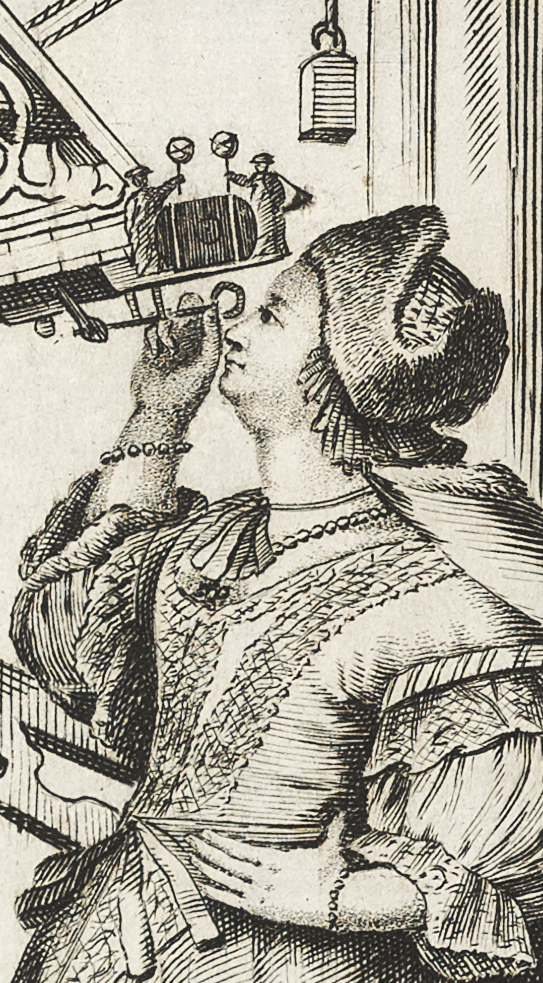
German–Polish astronomer Elisabetha Koopman Hevelius

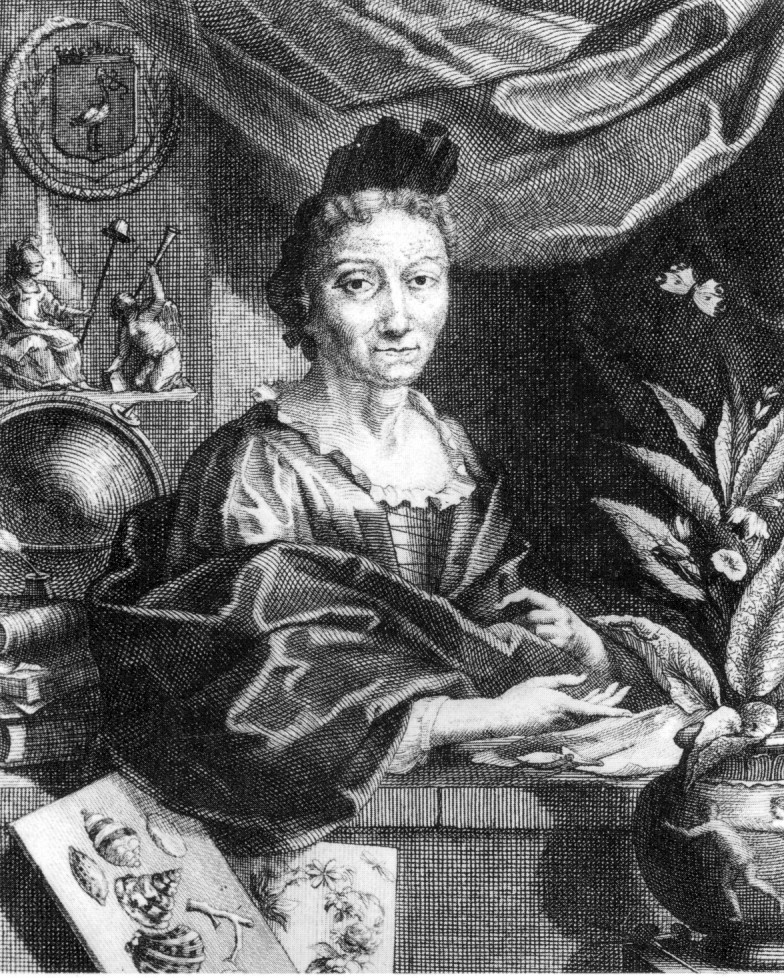
German entomologist Maria Sibylla Merian

- 1609: French midwife Louise Bourgeois Boursier became the first woman to write a book on childbirth practices.
- 1636: Anna Maria van Schurman is the first woman ever to attend university lectures. She had to sit behind a screen so that her male fellow students would not see her.
- 1642: Martine Bertereau, the first recorded female mineralogist, was imprisoned in France on suspicion of witchcraft. Bertereau had published two written works on the science of mining and metallurgy before being arrested.
- 1650: Silesian astronomer Maria Cunitz published Urania Propitia, a work that both simplified and substantially improved Johannes Kepler's mathematical methods for locating planets. The book was published in both Latin and German, an unconventional decision that made the scientific text more accessible for non-university educated readers.
- 1656: French chemist and alchemist Marie Meurdrac published her book La Chymie Charitable et Facile, en Faveur des Dames (Useful and Easy Chemistry, for the Benefit of Ladies).
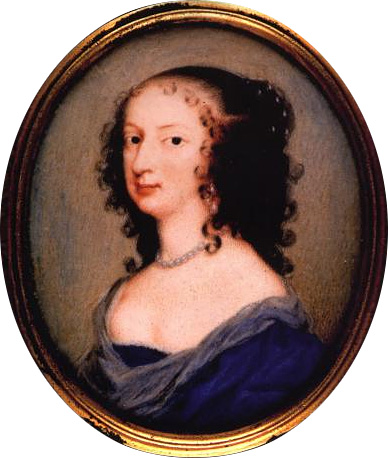
- English aristocrat, philosopher, poet, scientist, fiction-writer, and playwright Margaret Cavendish, Duchess of Newcastle-upon-Tyne
  1667: English aristocrat, philosopher, poet, scientist, fiction-writer, and playwright Margaret Lucas Cavendish, Duchess of Newcastle upon Tyne (1623 – 15 December 1673) was the first woman to attend a meeting at the Royal Society of London, in 1667. She criticised and engaged with members and philosophers including Thomas Hobbes, René Descartes, and Robert Boyle.
- 1668: After separating from her husband, French polymath Marguerite de la Sablière established a popular salon in Paris. Scientists and scholars from different countries visited the salon regularly to discuss ideas and share knowledge, and Sablière studied physics, astronomy and natural history with her guests.
- 1680: French astronomer Jeanne Dumée published a summary of arguments supporting the Copernican theory of heliocentrism. She wrote "between the brain of a woman and that of a man there is no difference".
- 1685: Frisian poet and archaeologist Titia Brongersma supervised the first excavation of a dolmen in Borger, Netherlands. The excavation produced new evidence that the stone structures were graves constructed by prehistoric humans – rather than structures built by giants, which had been the prior common belief.
- 1690: German-Polish astronomer Elisabetha Koopman Hevelius, widow of Johannes Hevelius, whom she had assisted with his observations (and, probably, computations) for over twenty years, published in his name Prodromus Astronomiae, the largest and most accurate star catalog to that date.
- 1693–1698: German astronomer and illustrator Maria Clara Eimmart created more than 350 detailed drawings of the moon phases.
- 1699: German entomologist Maria Sibylla Merian, the first scientist to document the life cycle of insects for the public, embarked on a scientific expedition to Suriname, South America. She subsequently published Metamorphosis insectorum Surinamensium, a groundbreaking illustrated work on South American plants, animals and insects.

== 18th century ==
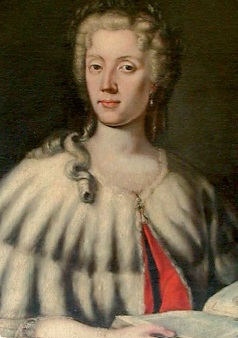
Italian physicist Laura Bassi

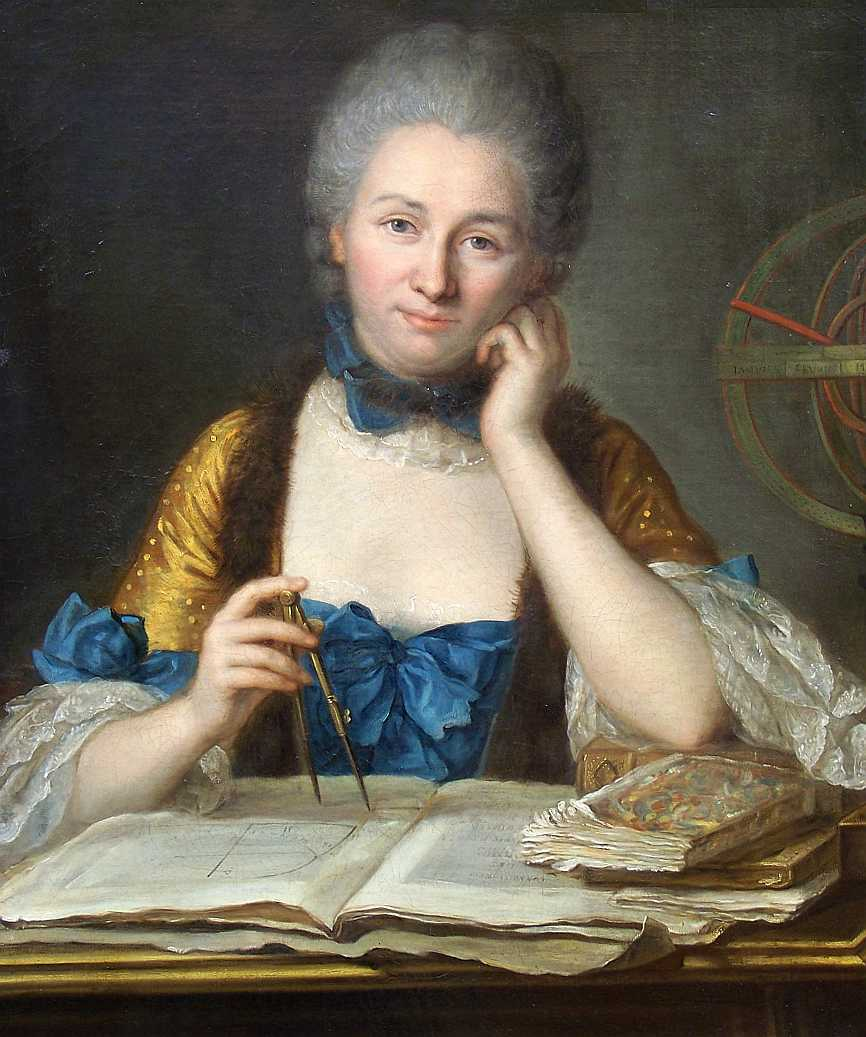
French polymath Émilie du Châtelet

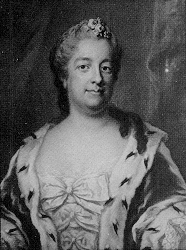
Swedish agronomist Eva Ekeblad

- 1702: Pioneering English entomologist Eleanor Glanville captured a butterfly specimen in Lincolnshire, which was subsequently named the Glanville fritillary in her honour. Her extensive butterfly collection impressed fellow entomologist William Vernon, who called Glanville's work "the noblest collection of butterflies, all English, which has sham'd us". Her butterfly specimens became part of early collections in the Natural History Museum.
- 1702: German astronomer Maria Kirch became the first woman to discover a comet.
- c. 1702–1744: In Montreal, Canada, French botanist Catherine Jérémie collected plant specimens and studied their properties, sending the specimens and her detailed notes back to scientists in France.
- 1732: At the age of 20, Italian physicist Laura Bassi became the first female member of the Bologna Academy of Sciences. One month later, she publicly defended her academic theses and received a PhD. Bassi was awarded an honorary position as professor of physics at the University of Bologna. She was the first female physics professor in the world.
- 1738: French polymath Émilie du Châtelet became the first woman to have a paper published by the Paris Academy, following a contest on the nature of fire.
- 1740: French polymath Émilie du Châtelet published Institutions de Physique (Foundations of Physics) providing a metaphysical basis for Newtonian physics.
- 1748: Swedish agronomist Eva Ekeblad became the first female member of the Royal Swedish Academy of Sciences. Two years earlier, she had developed a new process of using potatoes to make flour and alcohol, which subsequently lessened Sweden's reliance on wheat crops and decreased the risk of famine.
- 1751: 19-year-old Italian physicist Cristina Roccati received her PhD from the University of Bologna.
- 1753: American botanist Jane Colden was the only female biologist mentioned by Carl Linnaeus in his masterwork Species Plantarum.
- 1754: German physician Dorothea Erxleben was the first female to be awarded a doctor in medicine in Germany (University of Halle, then Kingdom of Prussia). She practiced medicine from 1747 to 1762 in Quedlinburg.
- 1755: After the death of her husband, Italian anatomist Anna Morandi Manzolini took his place at the University of Bologna, becoming a professor of anatomy and establishing an internationally known laboratory for anatomical research.
- 1757: French astronomer Nicole-Reine Lepaute worked with mathematicians Alexis Clairaut and Joseph Lalande to calculate the next arrival of Halley's Comet.
- 1760: American horticulturalist Martha Daniell Logan began corresponding with botanic specialist and collector John Bartram, regularly exchanging seeds, plants and botanical knowledge with him.
- 1762: French astronomer Nicole-Reine Lepaute calculated the time and percentage of a solar eclipse that had been predicted to occur in two years time. She created a map to show the phases, and published a table of her calculations in the 1763 edition of Connaissance des Temps.
- 1766: French chemist Geneviève Thiroux d'Arconville published her study on putrefaction. The book presented her observations from more than 300 experiments over the span of five years, during which she attempted to discover factors necessary for the preservation of beef, eggs, and other foods. Her work was recommended for royal privilege by fellow chemist Pierre-Joseph Macquer.
- c. 1775: French explorer, herbalist and botanist Jeanne Baret becomes the first woman to circumnavigate the globe.
- c. 1775: French chemist, scientific artist and translator, Marie-Anne Paulze Lavoisier began working with her husband chemist Antoine Lavoisier. She was instrumental in the 1789 publication of her husband’s groundbreaking Elementary Treatise on Chemistry, which presented a unified view of chemistry as a field, as she drew diagrams of all the equipment used, and kept strict records that lent validity to the findings. She also translated and critiqued Richard Kirwan's 'Essay on Phlogiston and the Constitution of Acids' which led to the discovery of oxygen gas.
- 1776: At the University of Bologna, Italian physicist Laura Bassi became the first woman appointed as chair of physics at a university.
- 1776: German astronomer Christine Kirch received a respectable salary of 400 Thaler for calendar-making. See also her sister Margaretha Kirch
- 1782–1791: French chemist and mineralogist Claudine Picardet translated more than 800 pages of Swedish, German, English and Italian scientific papers into French, enabling French scientists to better discuss and utilize international research in chemistry, mineralogy and astronomy.
- c. 1787–1797: Self-taught Chinese astronomer Wang Zhenyi published at least twelve books and multiple articles on astronomy and mathematics. Using a lamp, a mirror and a table, she once created a famous scientific exhibit designed to accurately simulate a lunar eclipse.
- 1786–1797: German astronomer Caroline Herschel discovered eight new comets, along with numerous other discoveries.
- 1789: French astronomer Louise du Pierry, the first Parisian woman to become an astronomy professor, taught the first astronomy courses specifically open to female students.
- 1794: British chemist Elizabeth Fulhame invented the concept of catalysis and published a book on her findings.
- c. 1796–1820: During the reign of the Jiaqing Emperor, astronomer Huang Lü became the first Chinese woman to work with optics and photographic images. She developed a telescope that could take simple photographic images using photosensitive paper.
- 1797: English science writer and schoolmistress Margaret Bryan published A Compendious System of Astronomy, including an engraving of herself and her two daughters. She dedicated the book to her students.

== Early 19th century ==
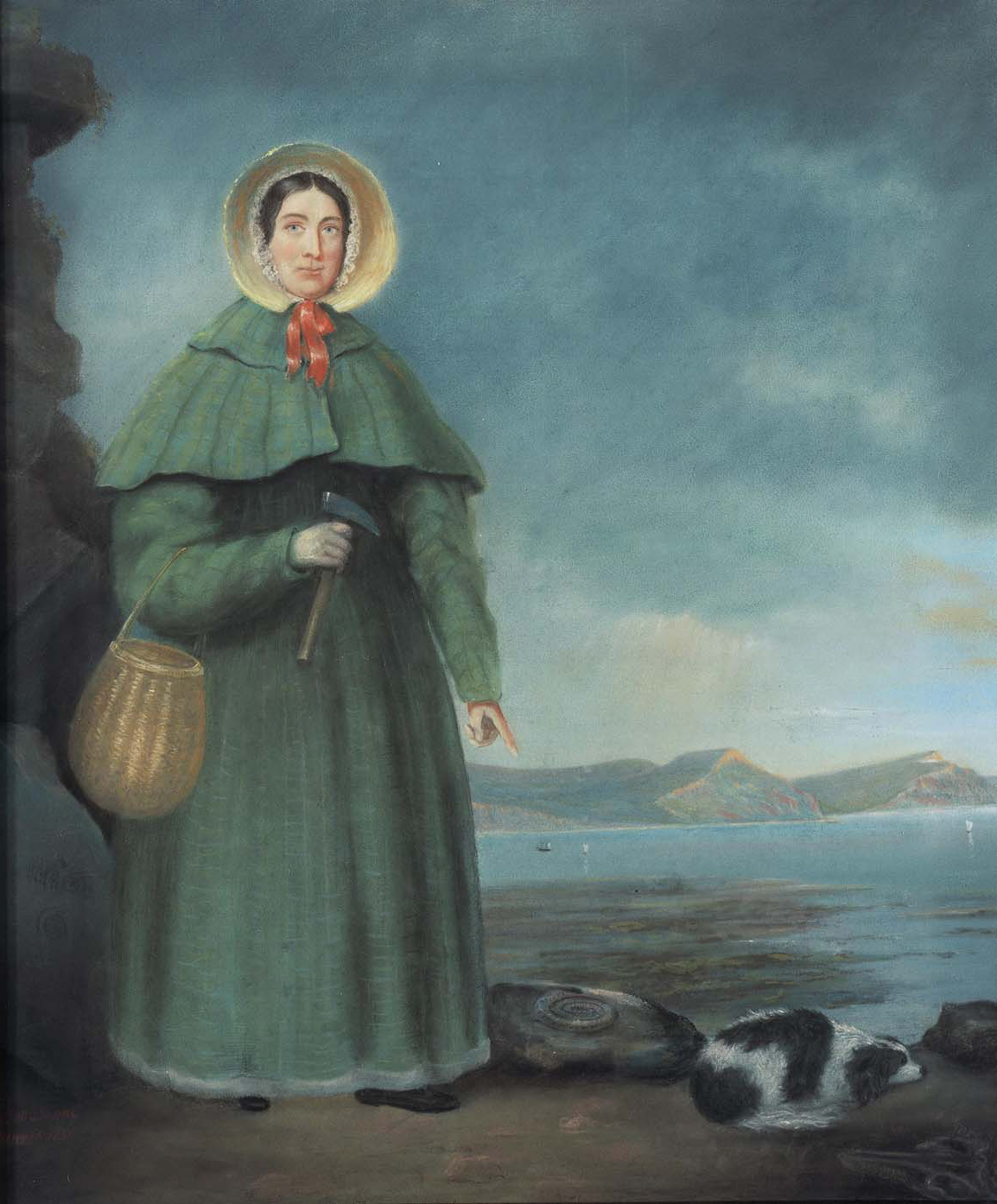
English paleontologist Mary Anning

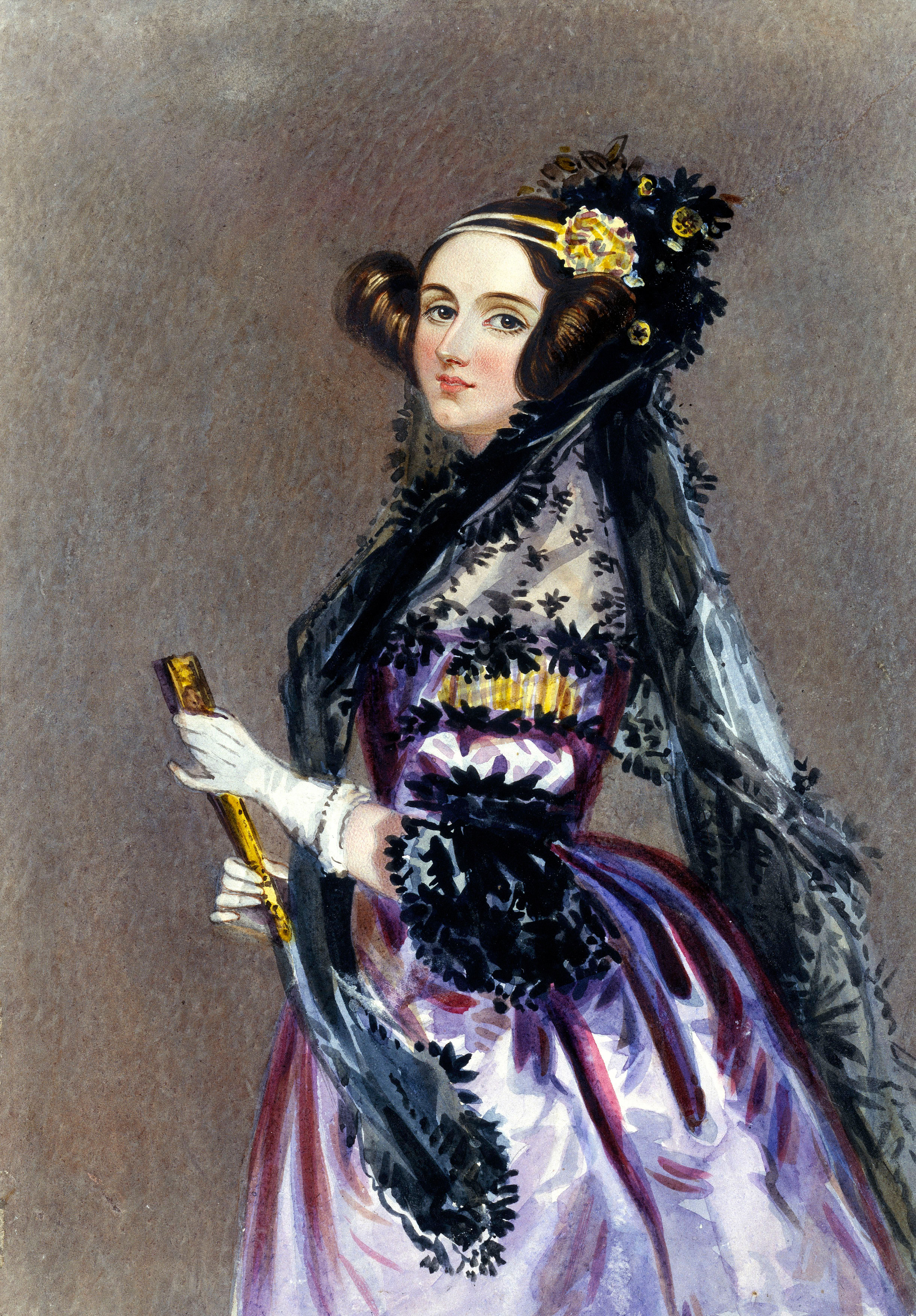
English mathematician and computer programmer Ada Lovelace

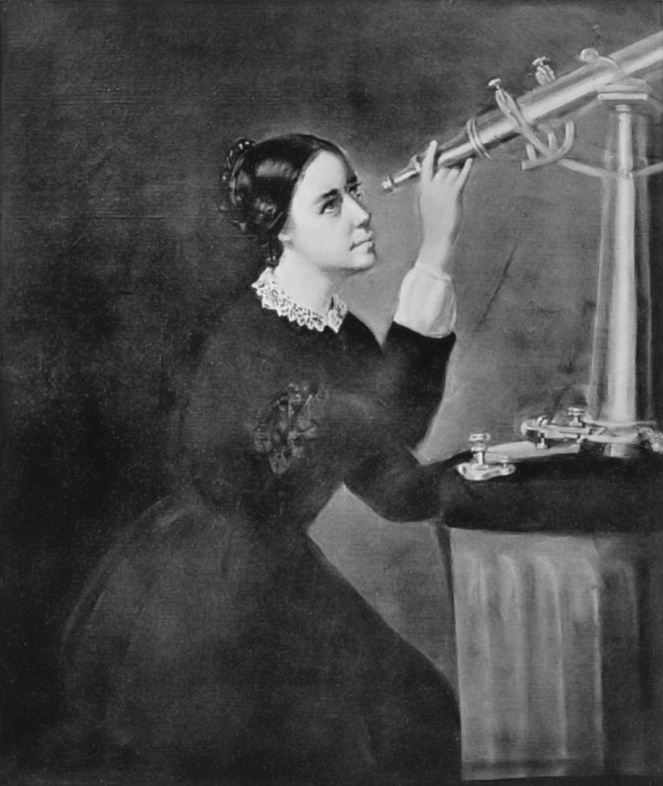
American astronomer Maria Mitchell

- 1808: Anna Sundström began assisting Jacob Berzelius in his laboratory, becoming one of the first Swedish women chemists.
- 1809: Italian pharmacist Sabina Baldoncelli earned her university degree in pharmacy but was allowed to work only in the Italian orphanage where she resided.
- 1815: English archaeologist and antiquarian Lady Hester Stanhope used a medieval Italian manuscript to locate a promising archaeological site in Ashkelon, becoming the first archaeologist to begin an excavation in the Palestinian region. It was one of the earliest examples of the use of textual sources in field archaeology.
- 1816: French mathematician and physicist Sophie Germain became the first woman to win a prize from the Paris Academy of Sciences for her work on elasticity theory.
- 1823: English palaeontologist and fossil collector Mary Anning discovered the first complete Plesiosaurus.
- 1831: Italian botanist Elisabetta Fiorini Mazzanti published her best-known work Specimen Bryologiae Romanae.
- 1830–1837: Belgian botanist Marie-Anne Libert published her four-volume Plantae cryptogamicae des Ardennes, a collection of 400 species of mosses, ferns, lichen, algae and fungi from the Ardennes region. Her contributions to systemic cryptogamic studies were formally recognized by Prussian king Friedrich Wilhelm III, and Libert received a gold medal of merit.
- 1832: French marine biologist Jeanne Villepreux-Power invented the first glass aquarium, using it to assist in her scientific observations of Argonauta argo.
- 1833: English phycologists Amelia Griffiths and Mary Wyatt published two books on local British seaweeds. Griffiths had an internationally respected reputation as a skilled seaweed collector and scholar, and Swedish botanist Carl Agardh had earlier named the seaweed genus Griffithsia in her honour.
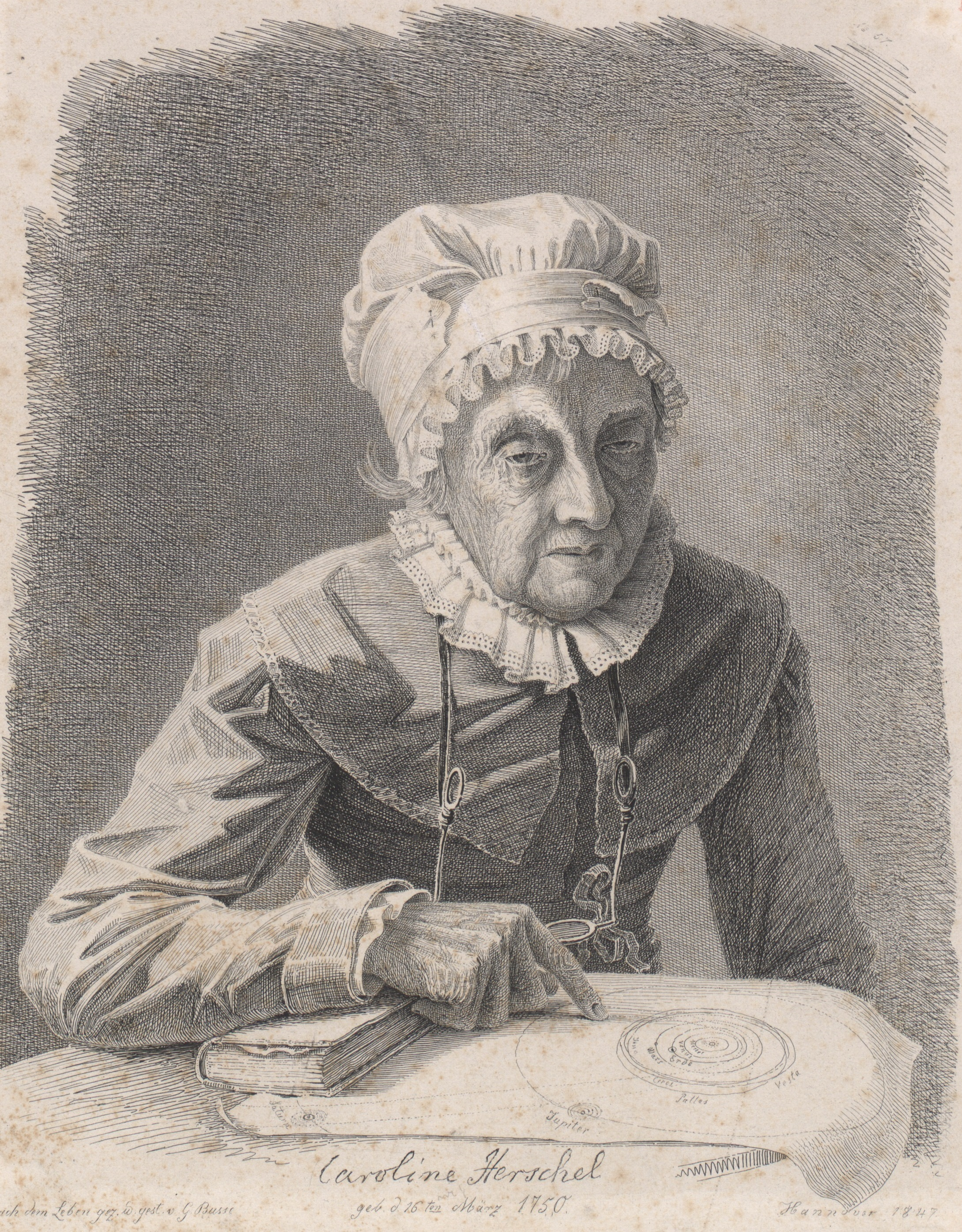
- German-British astronomer Caroline Herschel
  1833: American botanical and scientific illustrator Orra White Hitchcock was best known for illustrating the scientific works of her husband, geologist Edward Hitchcock (1793–1864), but was also notable for her own artistic and scientific work. The most well known appear in her husband's seminal works, the 1833 Report on the Geology, Mineralogy, Botany, and Zoology of Massachusetts and its successor, the 1841 Final Report produced when he was State Geologist. For the 1833 edition, Pendleton's Lithography (Boston) lithographed nine of Hitchcock's Connecticut River Valley drawings and printed them as plates for the work. In 1841, B. W. Thayer and Co., Lithographers (Boston) printed revised lithographs and an additional plate. The hand-colored plate "Autumnal Scenery. View in Amherst" is Hitchcock's most frequently seen work.
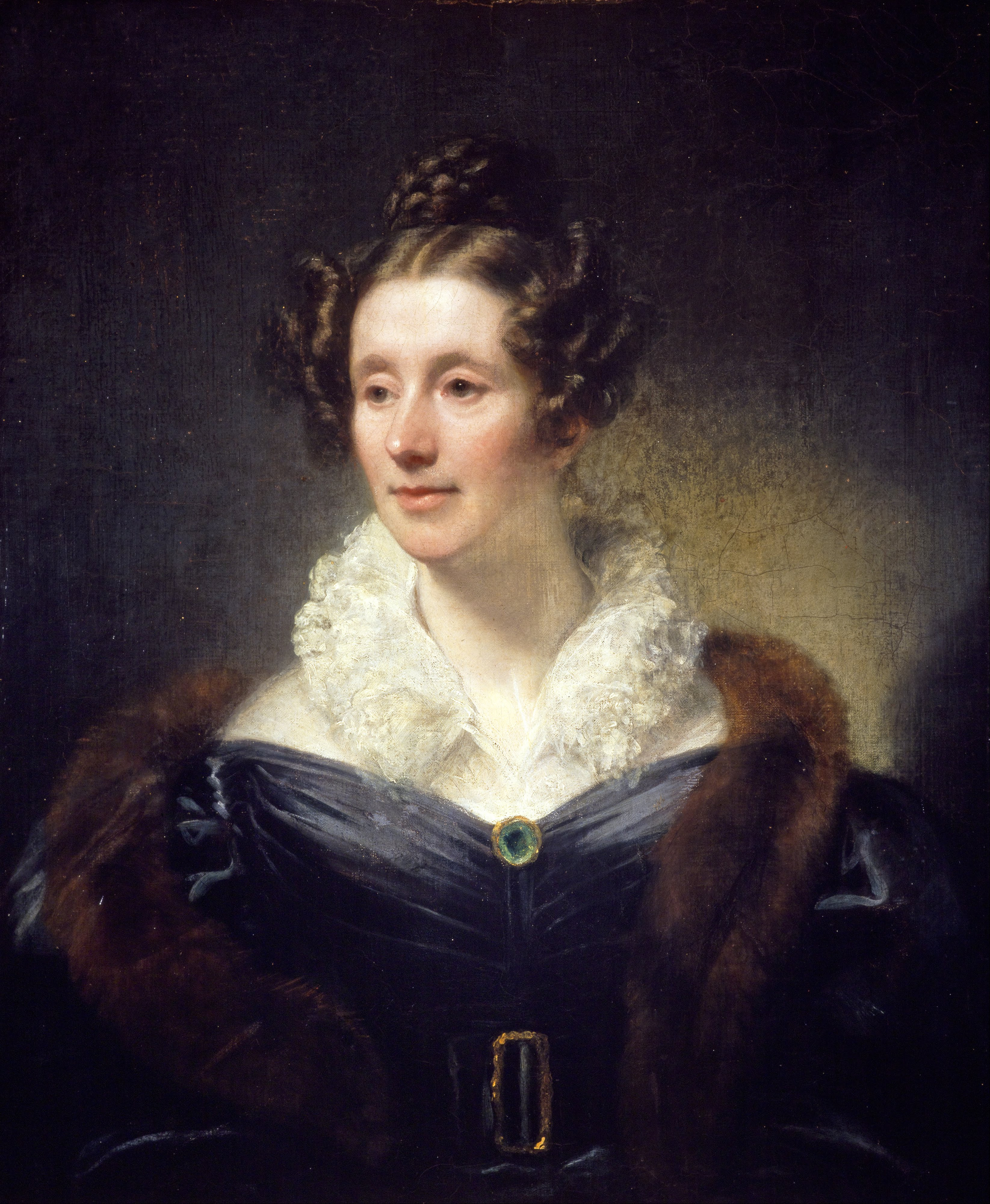
- British polymath Mary Somerville
  1835: Scottish polymath Mary Somerville and German astronomer Caroline Herschel were elected the first female members of the Royal Astronomical Society.
- 1836: Early English geologist and paleontologist Etheldred Benett, known for her extensive collection of several thousand fossils, was appointed a member of the Imperial Natural History Society of Moscow. The society – which only admitted men at the time – initially mistook Benett for a man due to her reputation as a scientist and her unusual first name, addressing her diploma of admission to "Dominum" (Master) Benett.
- 1840: Scottish fossil collector and illustrator Lady Eliza Maria Gordon-Cumming invited geologists Louis Agassiz, William Buckland and Roderick Murchison to examine her collection of fish fossils. Agassiz confirmed several of Gordon-Cumming's discoveries as new species.
- 1843: During a nine-month period in 1842–43, English mathematician Ada Lovelace translated Luigi Menabrea's article on Charles Babbage's newest proposed machine, the Analytical Engine. With the article, she appended a set of notes. Her notes were labelled alphabetically from A to G. In note G, she describes an algorithm for the Analytical Engine to compute Bernoulli numbers. It is considered the first published algorithm ever specifically tailored for implementation on a computer, and Ada Lovelace has often been cited as the first computer programmer for this reason. The engine was never completed, so her program was never tested.
- 1843: British botanist and pioneering photographer Anna Atkins self-published her book Photographs of British Algae, illustrating the work with cyanotypes. Her book was the first book on any subject to be illustrated by photographs.
- 1846: British zoologist Anna Thynne built the first stable, self-sustaining marine aquarium.
- 1848: American astronomer Maria Mitchell became the first woman elected to the American Academy of Arts and Sciences; she had discovered a new comet the year before.
- 1848–1849: English scientist Mary Anne Whitby, a pioneer in western silkworm cultivation, collaborated with Charles Darwin in researching the hereditary qualities of silkworms.
- 1850: The American Association for the Advancement of Sciences accepted its first women members: astronomer Maria Mitchell, entomologist Margaretta Morris, and science educator Almira Hart Lincoln Phelps.

== Late 19th century ==
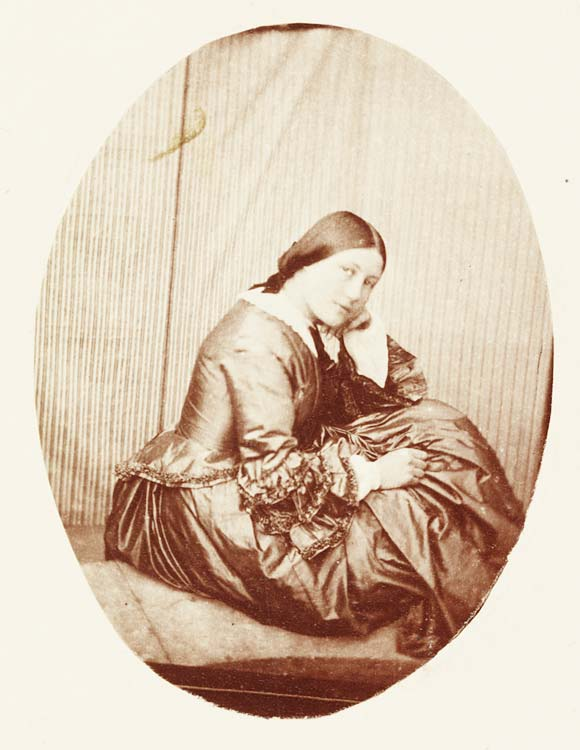
Welsh astronomer Thereza Dillwyn Llewelyn

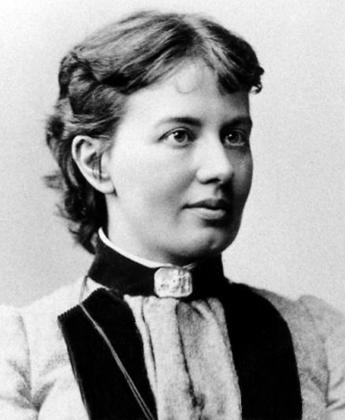
Russian scientist Sofia Kovalevskaya

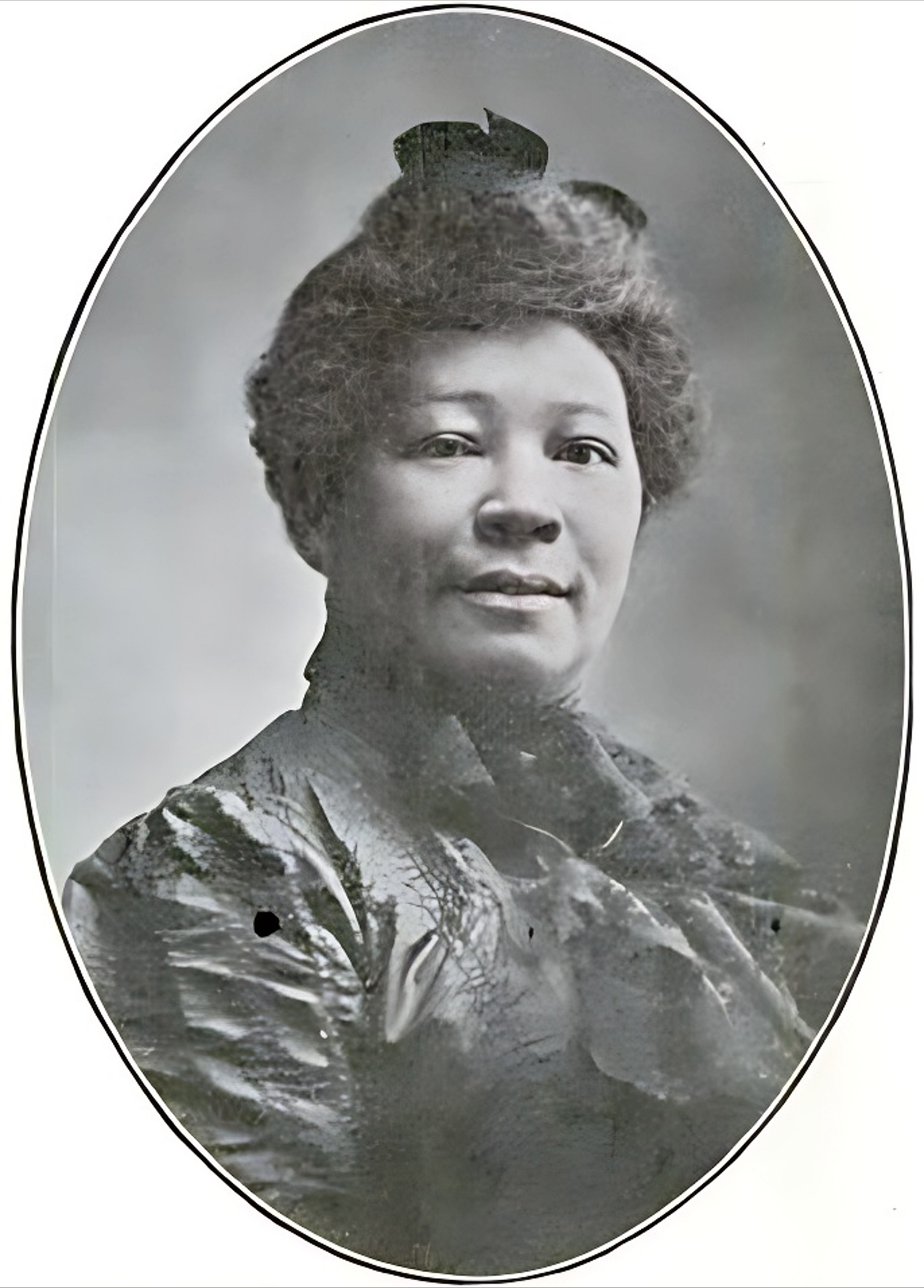
American chemist Josephine Silone-Yates

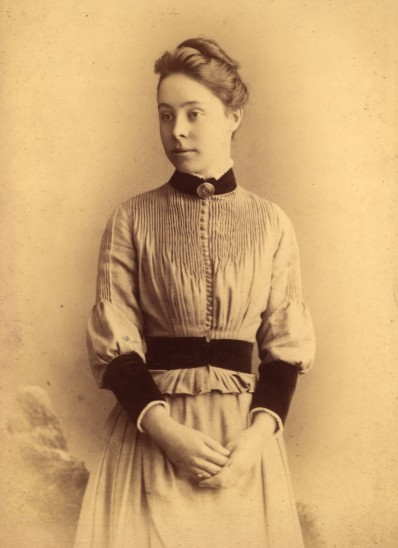
British mathematician Philippa Fawcett

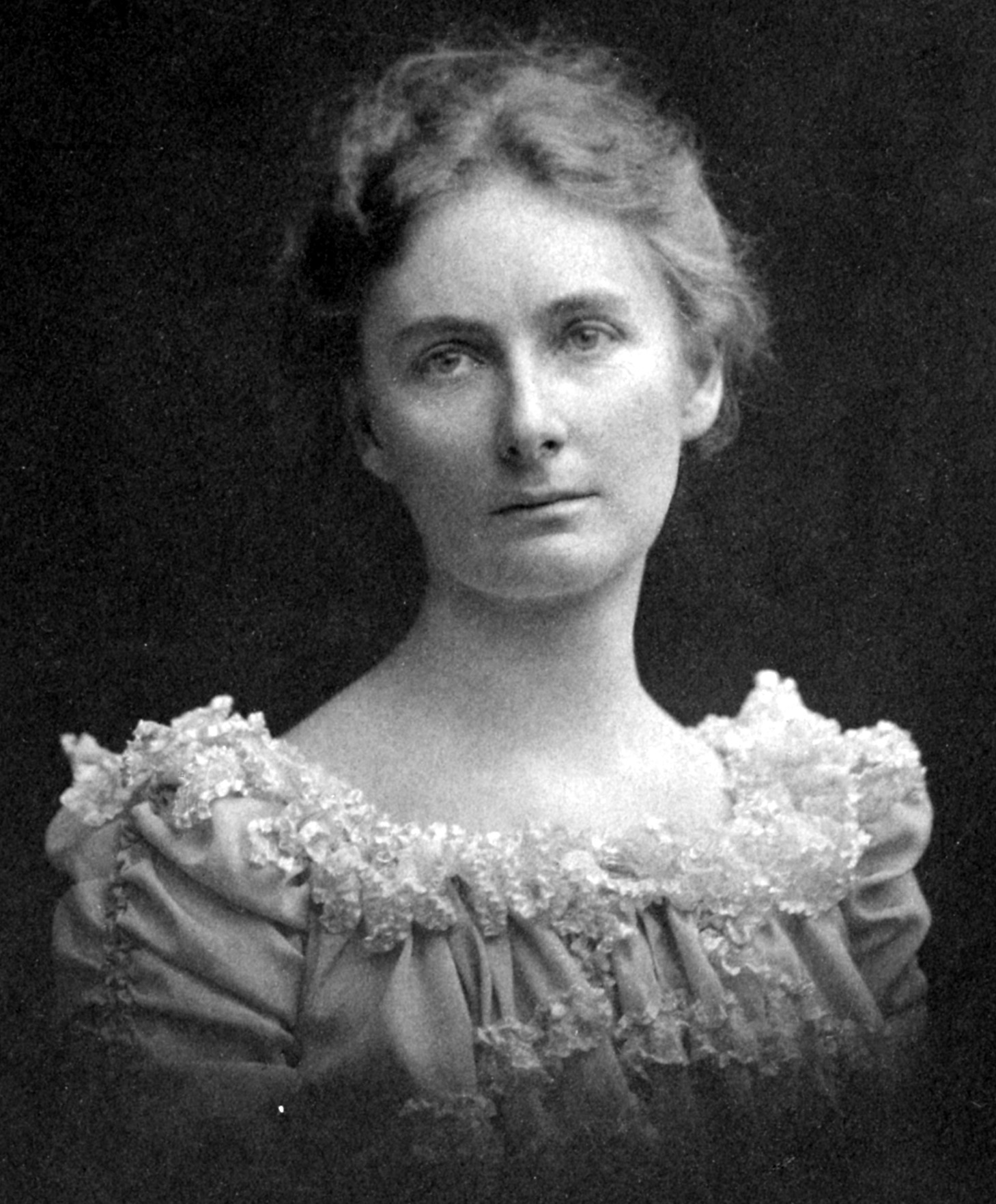
American geologist Florence Bascom

- 1854: British conchologist and geologist Mary Horner Lyell is most well known for her scientific work in 1854, where she studied her collection of land snails from the Canary Islands. She was married to the notable British geologist Charles Lyell and assisted him in his scientific work. It is believed by historians that she likely made major contributions to her husband's work.
- 1854–1855: English social reformer and statistician, and the founder of modern nursing Florence Nightingale organized care for wounded soldiers during the Crimean War. Her pie charts clearly showed that most deaths resulted from disease rather than battle wounds or "other causes," which led the general public to demand improved sanitation at field hospitals.
- 1855: Working with her father, Welsh astronomer and photographer Thereza Dillwyn Llewelyn produced some of the earliest photographs of the moon.
- 1856: American atmospheric scientist Eunice Newton Foote presented her paper "Circumstances affecting the heat of the sun's rays" at an annual meeting of the American Association for the Advancement of Sciences. She was an early researcher of the greenhouse effect.
- 1862: Belgian botanist Marie-Anne Libert became the first woman to join the Royal Botanical Society of Belgium. She was named an honorary member.
- 1863: German naturalist Amalie Dietrich arrived in Australia to collect plant, animal and anthropological specimens for the German Godeffroy Museum. She remained in Australia for the next decade, discovering a number of new plant and animal species in the process, but also became notorious in later years for her removal of Aboriginal skeletons – and the possible incitement of violence against Aboriginal people – for anthropological research purposes.
- 1865: English geologist Elizabeth Carne was elected the first female Fellow of the Royal Geological Society of Cornwall.
- 1869: British physician and suffragist Sophia Jex-Blake led the successful campaign for women to be allowed to enrol in university medical training in the UK. Subsequently the University of Edinburgh became the first British university to admit women and Jex-Blake became the first practising female doctor in Scotland.

=== 1870s ===
- 1869/1870: American beekeeper Ellen Smith Tupper became the first female editor of an entomological journal.
- 1870: Katharine Murray Lyell was a British botanist, author of an early book on the worldwide distribution of ferns, and editor of volumes of the correspondence of several of the era's notable scientists.
- 1870: American engineer and chemist Ellen Swallow Richards became the first American woman to earn a degree in chemistry.
- 1870: Russian chemist Anna Volkova became the first female member of the Russian Chemical Society.
- 1874: Russian chemist Julia Lermontova became the first Russian woman to receive a PhD in chemistry.
- 1875: Hungarian archaeologist Zsófia Torma excavated the site of Turdaș-Luncă in Hunedoara County, today in Romania. The site, which uncovered valuable prehistoric artifacts, became one of the most important archaeological discoveries in Europe.
- 1876–1878: American naturalist Mary Treat studied insectivorous plants in Florida. Her contributions to the scientific understanding of how these plants caught and digested prey were acknowledged by Charles Darwin and Asa Gray.
- 1878: English entomologist Eleanor Anne Ormerod became the first female Fellow of the Royal Meteorological Society. A few years afterwards, she was appointed as Consulting Entomologist to the Royal Agricultural Society.

=== 1880s ===
- 1880: Self-taught German chemist Agnes Pockels began investigating surface tension, becoming a pioneering figure in the field of surface science. The measurement equipment she developed provided the basic foundation for modern quantitative analyses of surface films.
- 1880: Norwegian zoologist and malacologist Birgitte Esmark's publication on mollusks becomes the first time in Norway that a woman had a scientific work published.
- 1881: Italian scientists Evangelina Bottero and Carolina Magistrelli became the first women to achieve doctoral degrees in science in unified Italy.
- 1883: American ethnologist Erminnie A. Smith, the first female field ethnographer, published her collection of Iroquois legends Myths of the Iroquois.
- 1884: English zoologist Alice Johnson's paper on newt embryos became the first paper authored by a woman to appear in the Proceedings of the Royal Society.
- 1885: British naturalist Marian Farquharson became the first female Fellow of the Royal Microscopical Society.
- 1886: American botanist Emily Lovira Gregory became the first female member of the American Society of Naturalists.
- 1887: Rachel Lloyd became the first American woman to receive a PhD in chemistry, completing her research at the Swiss University of Zurich.
- 1888: Russian scientist Sofia Kovalevskaya discovered the Kovalevskaya top, one of a brief list of known rigid body motion examples that are tractable by manipulating equations by hand.
- 1888: Scottish astronomer Williamina Fleming discovered the Horsehead Nebula on a telescope-photogrammetry plate.
- 1888: American chemist Josephine Silone Yates was appointed head of the Department of Natural Sciences at Lincoln Institute (later Lincoln University), becoming the first black woman to head a college science department.
- 1889: American astronomer Antonia Maury discovered the second spectroscopic binary, Beta Aurigae, and calculated its orbital period.
- 1889: American geologist Mary Emilie Holmes became the first female Fellow of the Geological Society of America.

=== 1890s ===
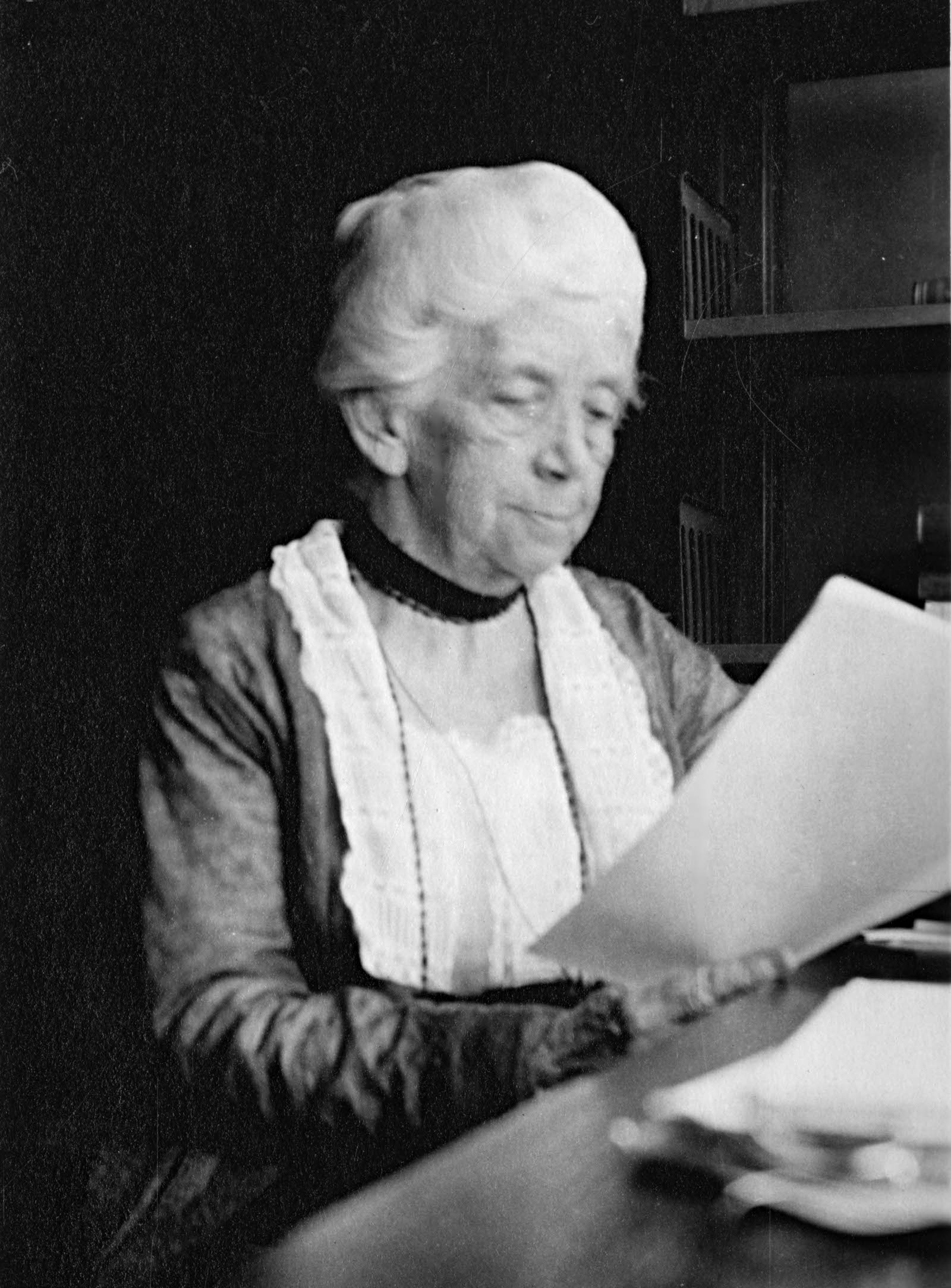
- American psychologist and logician Christine Ladd-Franklin
  1890: Austrian-born chemist Ida Freund became the first woman to work as a university chemistry lecturer in the United Kingdom. She was promoted to full lecturer at Newnham College, Cambridge.
- 1890: British popular science educator and author Agnes Giberne co-founded the British Astronomical Association. Subsequently, English astronomer Elizabeth Brown was appointed the director of the association's Solar Section, well known for her studies in sunspots and other solar phenomena.
- 1890: British mathematician Philippa Fawcett became the first woman to obtain the highest score in the Cambridge Mathematical Tripos examinations, a score "above the Senior Wrangler". (At the time, women were ineligible to be named Senior Wrangler.)
- 1891: American-born astronomer Dorothea Klumpke was appointed as Head of the Bureau of Measurements at the Paris Observatory. For the next decade, in addition to completing her doctorate of science, she worked on the Carte du Ciel mapping project. She was recognized for her work with the first Prix de Dames award from the Société astronomique de France and named an Officier of the Paris Academy of Sciences.
- 1892: American psychologist and logician Christine Ladd-Franklin presented her evolutionary theory on the development of colour vision to the International Congress of Psychology. Her theory was the first to emphasize colour vision as an evolutionary trait.
- 1893: Florence Bascom became the second woman to earn her PhD in geology in the United States, and the first woman to receive a PhD from Johns Hopkins University. Geologists consider her to be the "first woman geologist in this country (America)".
- 1893: American botanist Elizabeth Gertrude Britton became a charter member of the Botanical Society of America.
- 1894: American astronomer Margaretta Palmer became the first woman to earn a doctorate in astronomy.
- 1895: English physiologist Marion Bidder became the first woman to speak and present her own paper at a meeting of the Royal Society.
- 1896: Florence Bascom became the first woman to work for the United States Geological Survey.
- 1896: English mycologist and lichenologist Annie Lorrain Smith became a founding member of the British Mycological Society. She later served as president twice.
- 1896: Russian ophthalmologist Rosa Kerschbaumer-Putjata graduated from the University of Bern. She became the first female doctor permitted to practice in Austria due to a special permit granted by Emperor Franz Joseph I of Austria. She campaigned for women's right to study medicine in Austria.
- 1897: American cytologists and zoologists Katharine Foot and Ella Church Strobell started working as research partners. Together, they pioneered the practice of photographing microscopic research samples and invented a new technique for creating thin material samples in colder temperatures.
- 1897: American physicist Isabelle Stone became the first woman to receive a PhD in physics in the United States. She wrote her dissertation "On the Electrical Resistance of Thin Films" at the University of Chicago.
- 1898: Danish physicist Kirstine Meyer was awarded the gold medal of the Royal Danish Academy of Sciences and Letters.
- 1898: Italian malacologist Marianna Paulucci donated her collection of specimens to the Royal Museum of Natural History in Florence, Italy (Museo di Storia Naturale di Firenze). Paulucci was the first scientist to compile and publish a species list of Italian malacofauna.
- 1899: American physicists Marcia Keith and Isabelle Stone became charter members of the American Physical Society.
- 1899: Irish physicist Edith Anne Stoney was appointed a physics lecturer at the London School of Medicine for Women, becoming the first female medical physicist. She later became a pioneering figure in the use of X-ray machines on the front lines of World War I.

== Early 20th century ==
=== 1900s ===
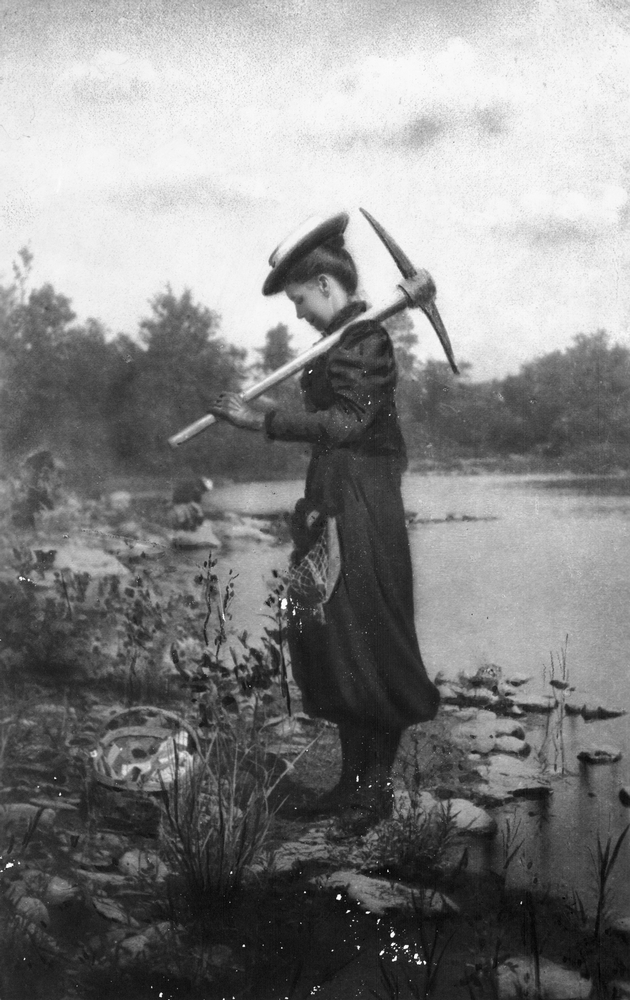
American geologist and geographer Zonia Baber

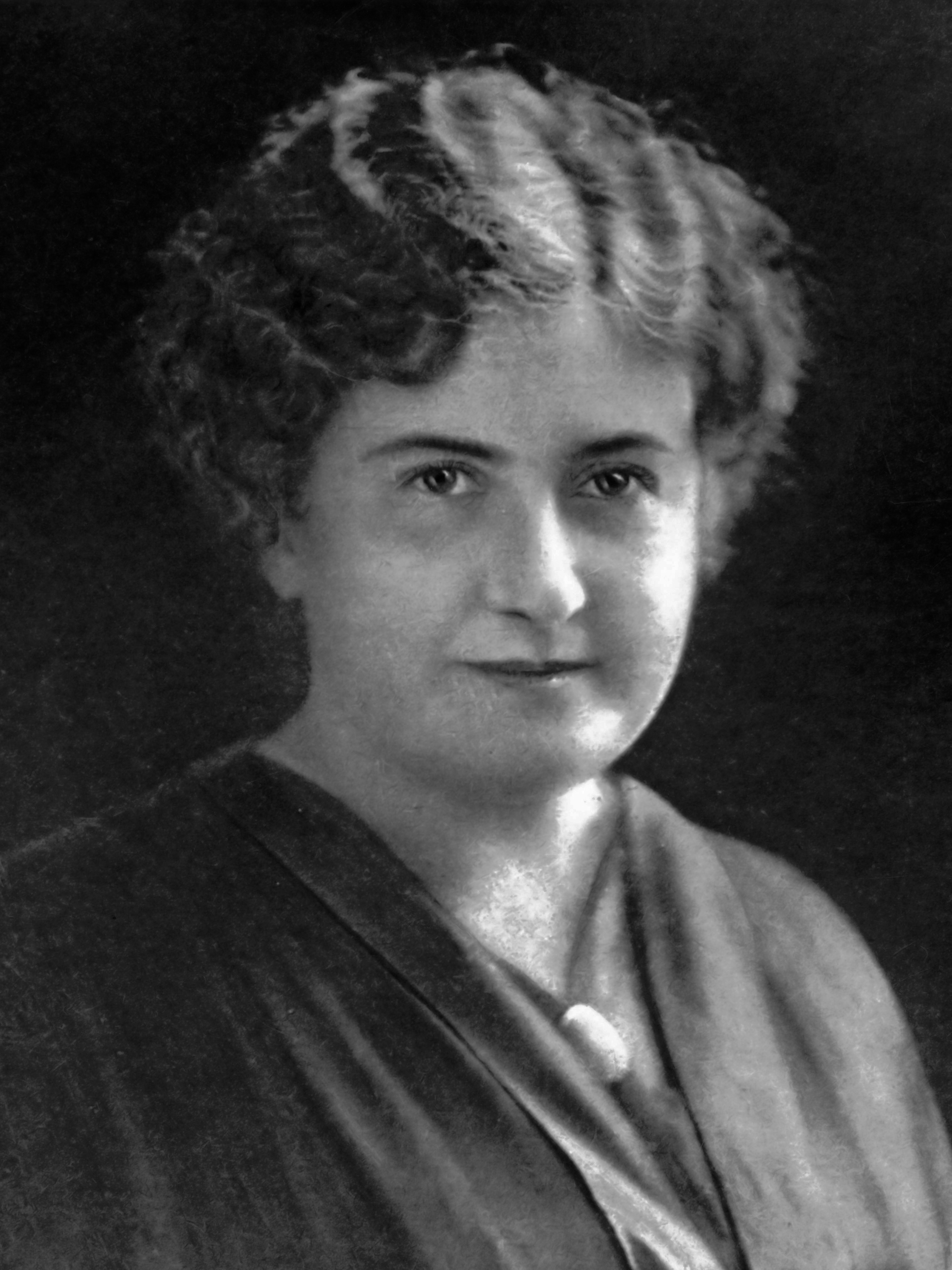
Italian physician and educator Maria Montessori

- 1900: American botanist Anna Murray Vail became the first librarian of the New York Botanical Garden. A key supporter of the institution's establishment, she had earlier donated her entire collection of 3000 botanical specimens to the garden.
- 1900: Physicists Marie Skłodowska–Curie and Isabelle Stone attended the first International Congress of Physics in Paris, France. They were the only two women out of 836 participants.
- 1901: American Florence Bascom became the first female geologist to present a paper before the Geological Survey of Washington.
- 1901: Czech botanist and zoologist Marie Zdeňka Baborová-Čiháková became the first woman in the Czech Republic to receive a PhD.
- 1901: American astronomer Annie Jump Cannon published her first catalog of stellar spectra, which classified stars by temperature. This method was universally and permanently adopted by other astronomers.
- 1903: English microbiologist Grace Coleridge Frankland published her most notable work, Bacteria in Daily Life. She was also one of the nineteen female scientists who wrote the 1904 petition to the Chemical Society to request that they should create some female fellows of the society.
- 1903: Polish-born physicist and chemist Marie Skłodowska–Curie became the first woman to receive a Nobel Prize when she received the Nobel Prize in Physics along with her husband, Pierre Curie, "for their joint researches on the radiation phenomena discovered by Professor Henri Becquerel", and Henri Becquerel, "for his discovery of spontaneous radioactivity".
- 1904: American geographer, geologist and educator Zonia Baber published her article "The Scope of Geography", in which she laid out her educational theories on the teaching of geography. She argued that students required a more interdisciplinary, experiential approach to learning geography: instead of a reliance on textbooks, students needed field-trips, lab work and map-making knowledge. Baber's educational ideas transformed the way schools taught geography.
- 1904: British chemists Ida Smedley, Ida Freund and Martha Whiteley organized a petition asking the Chemical Society to admit women as Fellows. A total of 19 female chemists became signatories, but their petition was denied by the society.
- 1904: Marie Stopes was a British author, palaeobotanist and campaigner for women's rights. She made significant contributions to plant palaeontology and coal classification. She held the post of Lecturer in Palaeobotany at the University of Manchester from 1904 to 1910; in this capacity she became the first female academic of that university. In 1909, she was elected to the Linnean Society of London. She was 26 at the time of her election to Fellowship (the youngest woman admitted at that time).
- 1904: In a December meeting, the Linnean Society of London elected its first women Fellows. These initial women included horticulturalist Ellen Willmott, ornithologist Emma Turner, biologist Lilian Jane Gould, mycologists Gulielma Lister and Annie Lorrain Smith, and botanists Mary Anne Stebbing, Margaret Jane Benson and Ethel Sargant.
- 1905: American geneticist Nettie Stevens discovered sex chromosomes.
- 1906: Following the San Francisco earthquake, American botanist and curator Alice Eastwood rescued almost 1500 rare plant specimens from the burning California Academy of Sciences building. Her curation system of keeping type specimens separate from other collections – unconventional at the time – allowed her to quickly find and retrieve the specimens.
- 1906: Russian chemist Irma Goldberg published a paper on two newly discovered chemical reactions involving the presence of copper and the creation of a nitrogen-carbon bond to an aromatic halide. These reactions were subsequently named the Goldberg reaction and the Jourdan-Ullman-Goldberg reaction.
- 1906: English physicist, mathematician and engineer Hertha Ayrton became the first female recipient of the Hughes Medal from the Royal Society of London. She received the award for her experimental research on electric arcs and sand ripples.
- 1906: After her death, English lepidopterist Emma Hutchinson's collection of 20,000 butterflies and moths was donated to the London Natural History Museum. She had published little during her lifetime, and was barred from joining local scientific societies due to her gender, but was honoured for her work when a variant form of the comma butterfly was named hutchinsoni.
- 1907: Swedish-Norwegian physicist and nutritionist Signe Schmidt-Nielsen became one of the first women in Sweden to receive a doctoral degree. She was also the first woman to become a member of the Royal Norwegian Society of Sciences and Letters.
- 1909: Alice Wilson became the first female geologist hired by the Geological Survey of Canada. She is widely credited as being the first Canadian female geologist.
- 1909: Danish physicist Kirstine Meyer became the first Danish woman to receive a doctorate degree in natural sciences. She wrote her dissertation on the topic of "the development of the temperature concept" within the history of physics.

=== 1910s ===
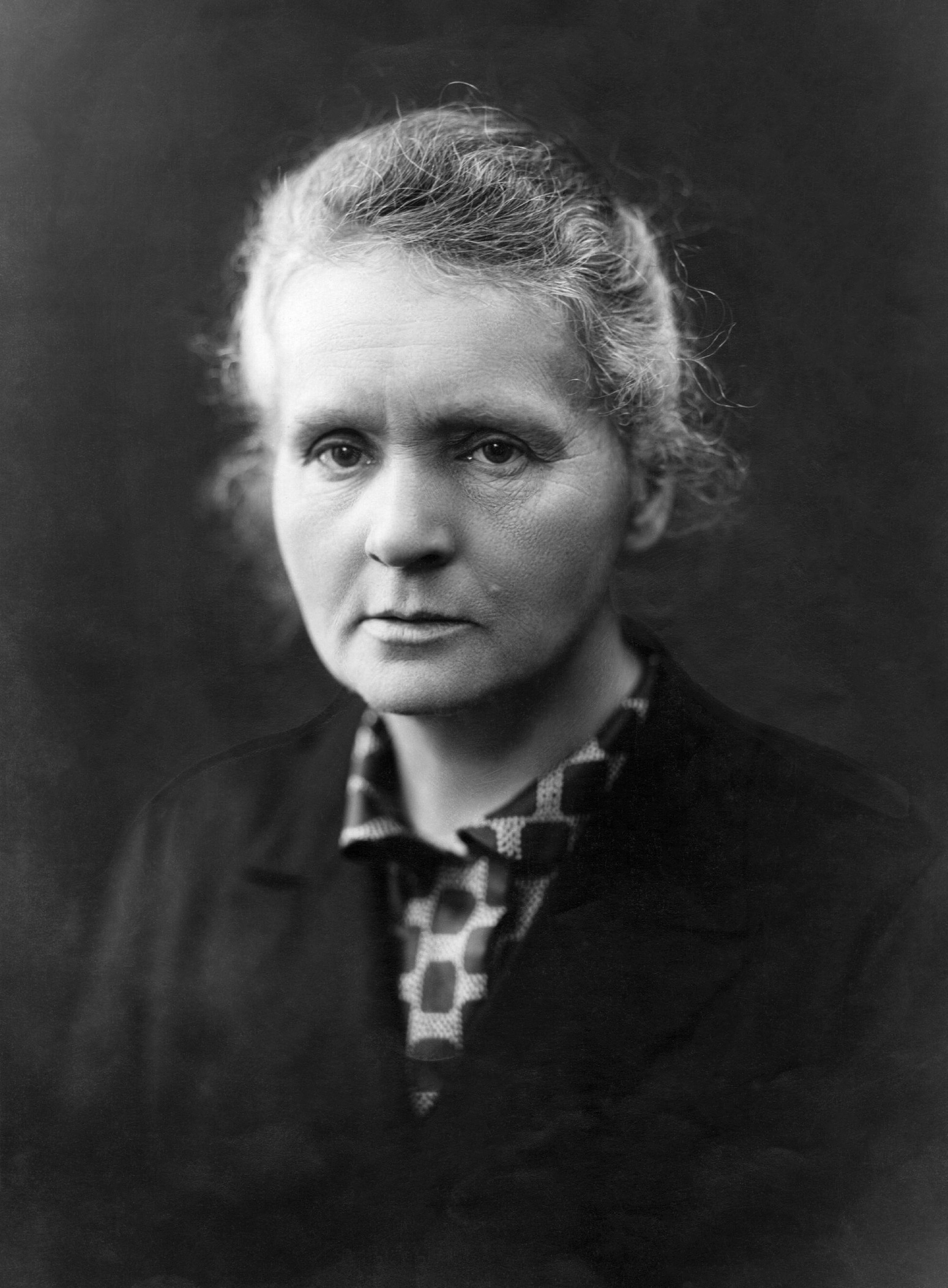
Polish-born physicist and chemist Marie Curie

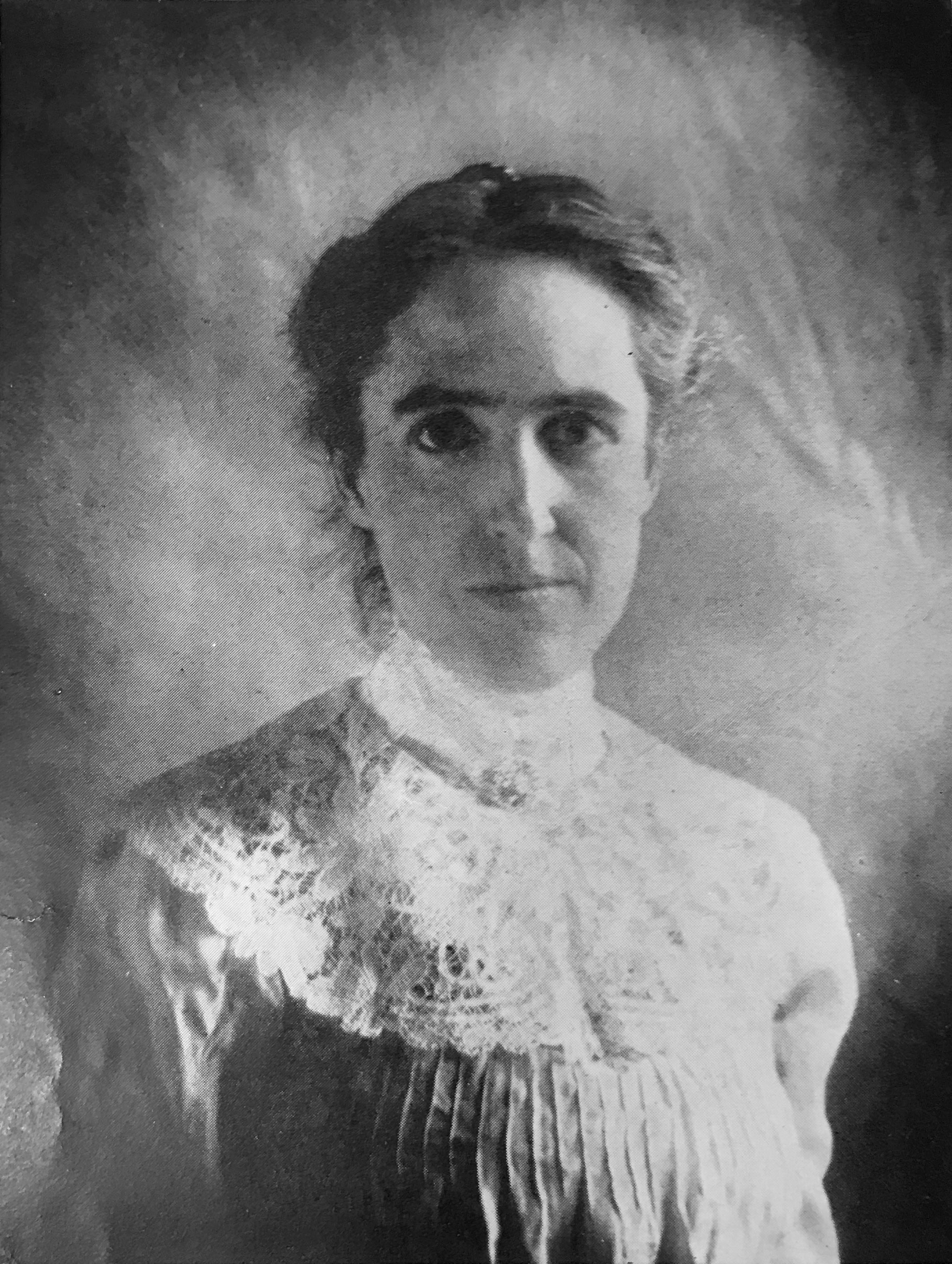
American astronomer Henrietta Swan Leavitt

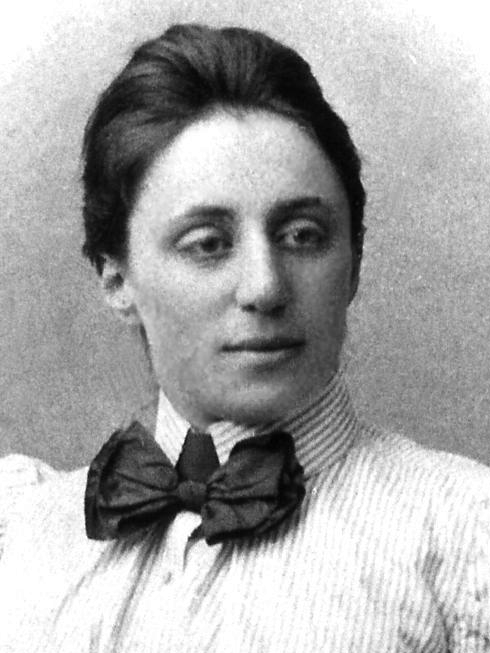
German physicist and mathematician Emmy Noether

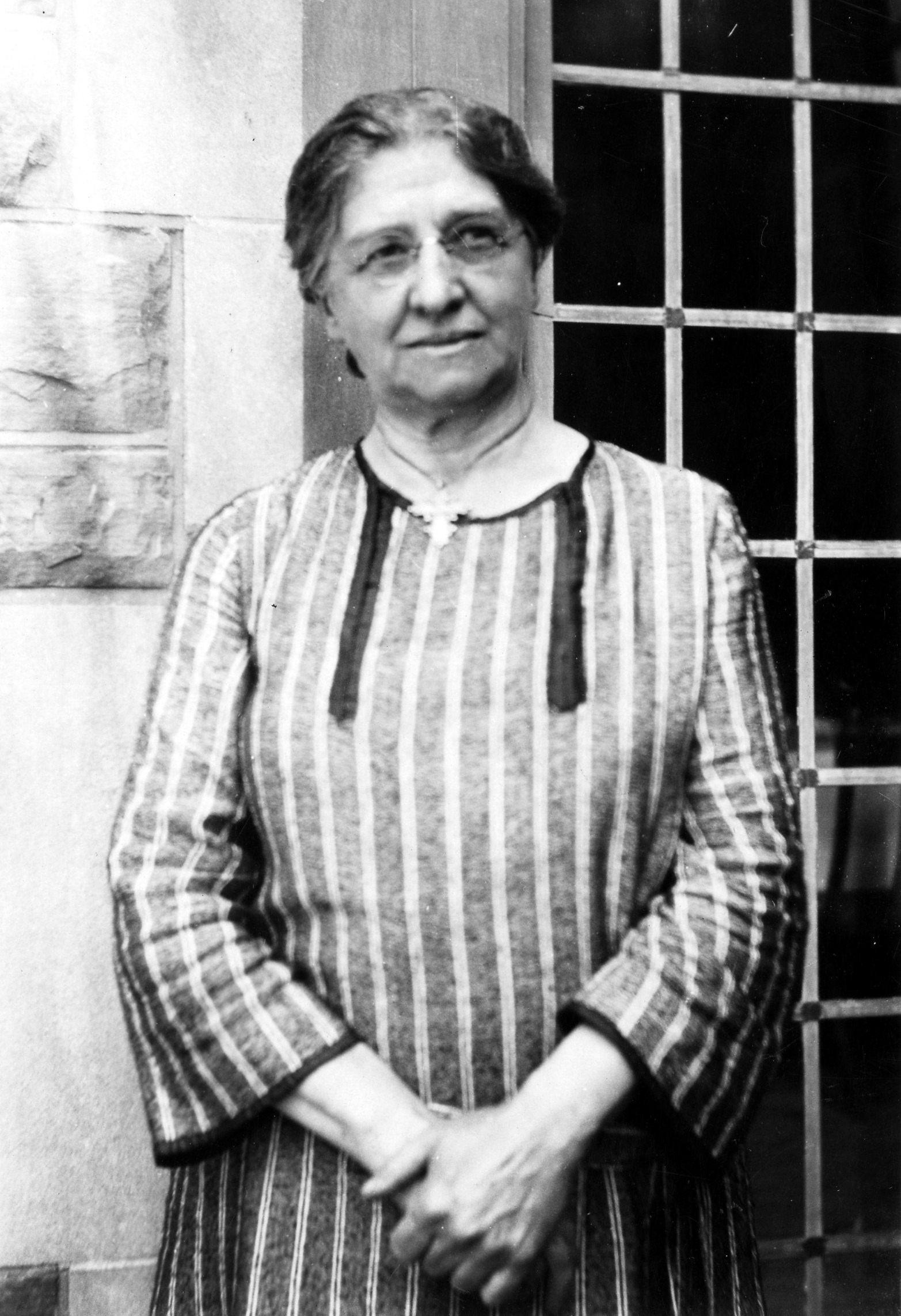
Canadian geneticist Carrie Derick

- 1911: Polish-born physicist and chemist Marie Curie became the first woman to receive the Nobel Prize in Chemistry, which she received "[for] the discovery of the elements radium and polonium, by the isolation of radium and the study of the nature and compounds of this remarkable element". This made her the first person to win the Nobel Prize twice. As of 2022, she is the only woman to win it twice and the only person to win the Nobel Prize in two scientific fields.
- 1911: Norwegian biologist Kristine Bonnevie became the first woman member of the Norwegian Academy of Science and Letters.
- 1912: American astronomer Henrietta Swan Leavitt studied the bright-dim cycle periods of Cepheid stars, then found a way to calculate the distance from such stars to Earth.
- 1912: Canadian botanist and geneticist Carrie Derick was appointed a professor of morphological botany at McGill University. She was the first woman to become a full professor in any department at a Canadian university.
- 1912: Bengali physician Jamini Sen became the first female Fellow of the Royal Faculty of Physicians and Surgeons of Glasgow.
- 1913: Regina Fleszarowa became the first Polish woman to receive a PhD in natural sciences.
- 1913: Izabela Textorisová, the first Slovak female botanist, published "Flora Data from the County of Turiec" in the journal Botanikai Közlemények. Her work uncovered more than 100 previously unknown species of plants from the Turiec area.
- 1913: Canadian physician and chemist Maud Menten co-authored a paper on enzyme kinetics, leading to the development of the Michaelis–Menten kinetics equation.
- 1914–1918: During World War I, a team of seven British women chemists conducted pioneering research on chemical antidotes and weaponized gases. The project leader, Martha Annie Whiteley, was awarded the Order of the British Empire for her wartime contributions.
- 1914-1918: English botanist and mycologist Helen Gwynne-Vaughan was the first woman to be awarded a military DBE for her wartime service in January 1918. She served as Commandant of the Women's Royal Air Force (WRAF) from September 1918 until December 1919.
- 1914: British-born mycologist Ethel Doidge became the first woman in South Africa to receive a doctorate in any subject, receiving her doctorate of science degree from the University of the Good Hope. She wrote her thesis on "A bacterial disease of mango".
- 1916: Canadian horticulturist Isabella Preston became the first female professional plant hybridist in Canada, producing the George C. Creelman trumpet lily. Her lily later received an Award of Merit from the Royal Horticultural Society.
- 1916: Chika Kuroda became the first Japanese woman to earn a bachelor of science degree, studying chemistry at the Tohoku Imperial University. After graduation, she was subsequently appointed an assistant professor at the university.
- 1917: American zoologist Mary J. Rathbun received her PhD from the George Washington University. Despite never having attended college – or any formal schooling beyond high school – Rathbun had authored more than 80 scientific publications, described over 674 new species of crustacean, and developed a system for crustacean-related records at the Smithsonian Museum.
- 1917: Dutch biologist and phytopathologist Johanna Westerdijk became the first female university professor in the Netherlands. She was appointed an extraordinary professor of phytopathology at the University of Utrecht.
- 1918: German physicist and mathematician Emmy Noether created Noether's theorem explaining the connection between symmetry and conservation laws.
- 1919: Dutch biologist and geneticist Jantina Tammes became the university professor in the Netherlands. She was appointed an extraordinary professor of variability and heredity at the University of Groningen. She became the first person in the Netherlands to occupy a chair in genetic. Moreover, she became the second female professor in the country, and the first one at the University of Groningen. She held this position until 1937, when she resigned at the age of sixty-six.
- 1919: Chilean engineer Justicia Espada Acuña graduates from Universidad de Chile, becoming the first woman with degree in civil engineering in South America
- 1919: Kathleen Maisey Curtis became the first New Zealand woman to earn a Doctorate of Science degree (DSc), completing her thesis on Synchytrium endobioticum (potato wart disease) at the Imperial College of Science and Technology. Her research was cited as "the most outstanding result in mycological research that had been presented for ten years".

=== 1920s ===
British-American astronomer Cecilia Payne-Gaposchkin

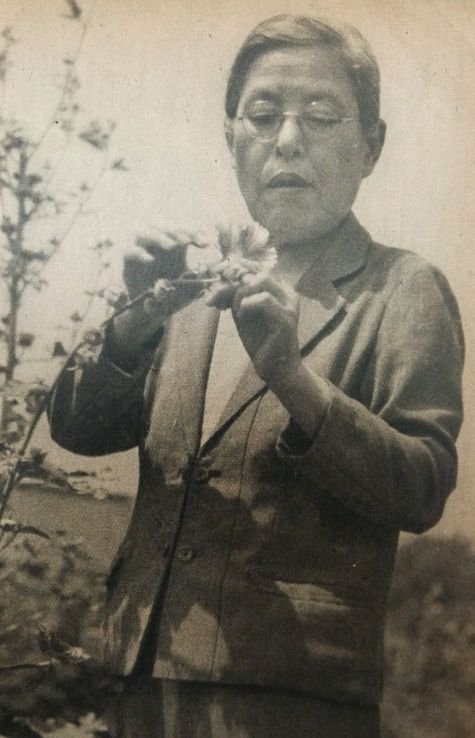
Japanese biologist Kono Yasui

- 1920: South African botanist Louisa Bolus was elected a Fellow of the Royal Society of South Africa for her contributions to botany. Over the course of her lifetime, Bolus identified and named more than 1,700 new South African plant species - more species than any other botanist in South Africa.
- 1921: Edelmira Inés Mórtola, the first woman to become a geologist in Argentina, was awarded her PhD by the University of Buenos Aires, the first woman to received her doctorate there. The university named the Mórtola Mineralogy Museum in her honor.
- 1922: American anatomist, physician and histologist Katharine Bishop and Herbert McLean Evans co-discovered Vitamin E while studying the reproductive cycle of rats.
- 1923: Argentine physician María Teresa Ferrari earned the first diploma awarded to a woman by the Faculty of Medicine at the University of Paris for her studies of the urinary tract.
- 1924: Florence Bascom became the first woman elected to the Council of the Geological Society of America.
- 1925: Mexican-American botanist Ynes Mexia embarked on her first botanical expedition into Mexico, collecting over 1500 plant specimens. Over the course of the next thirteen years, Mexia collected more than 145,000 specimens from Mexico, Alaska, and multiple South American countries. She discovered 500 new species.
- 1925: American medical scientist Florence Sabin became the first woman elected to the National Academy of Sciences.
- 1925: British-American astronomer and astrophysicist Cecilia Payne-Gaposchkin established that hydrogen is the most common element in stars, and thus the most abundant element in the universe.
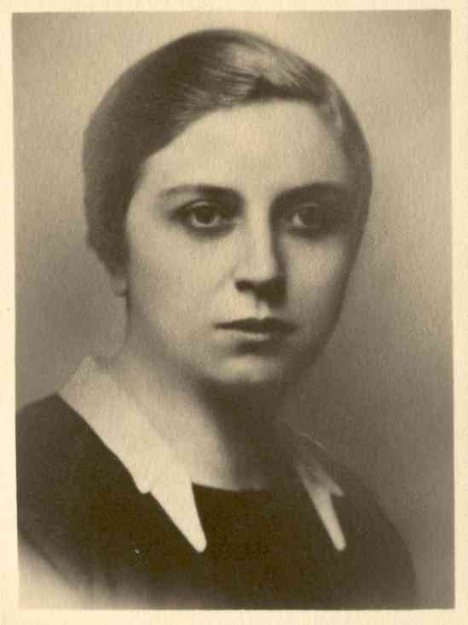
- Czech astronomer Bohumila Bednářová
  1926: American scientist Katharine Burr Blodgett became the first woman to earn a PhD in physics at the University of Cambridge, under the supervision of Sir Ernest Rutherford.
- 1927: Japanese biologist and cytologist Kono Yasui became the first Japanese woman to earn a doctorate in science, studying at the Tokyo Imperial University and completing her thesis on "Studies on the structure of lignite, brown coal, and bituminous coal in Japan".
- 1927: Bohumila Bednářová, the first Czech woman to become professionally involved in astronomy, co-founds the Prague Observatory.
- 1928: American microbiologist Alice Evans became the first woman elected president of the Society of American Bacteriologists.
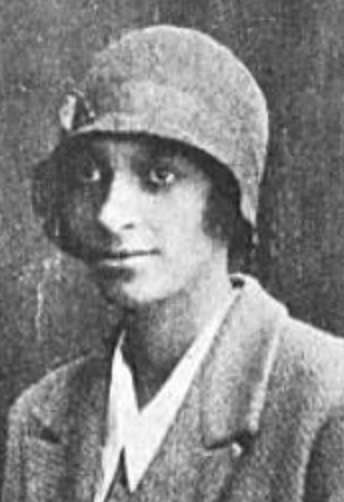
- Scottish-Nigerian physician Agnes Yewande Savage
  1928: Helen Battle became the first woman to earn a PhD in marine biology in Canada.
- 1928: British biologist Kathleen Carpenter published the first English-language textbook devoted to freshwater ecology: Life in Inland Waters.
- 1929: American botanist Margaret Clay Ferguson became the first female president of the Botanical Society of America.
- 1929: Scottish-Nigerian physician Agnes Yewande Savage became the first West African woman to graduate from medical school, obtaining her degree at the University of Edinburgh Medical School.
- 1929: British crystallographer and activist Kathleen Lonsdale proved that the benzene ring is flat by using X-ray diffraction methods to elucidate the structure of hexamethylbenzene. She was also the first to use Fourier spectral methods while solving the structure of hexachlorobenzene in 1931.

=== 1930s ===
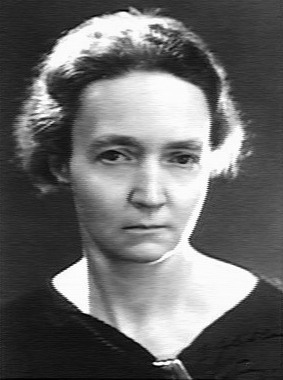
French chemist Irène Joliot-Curie

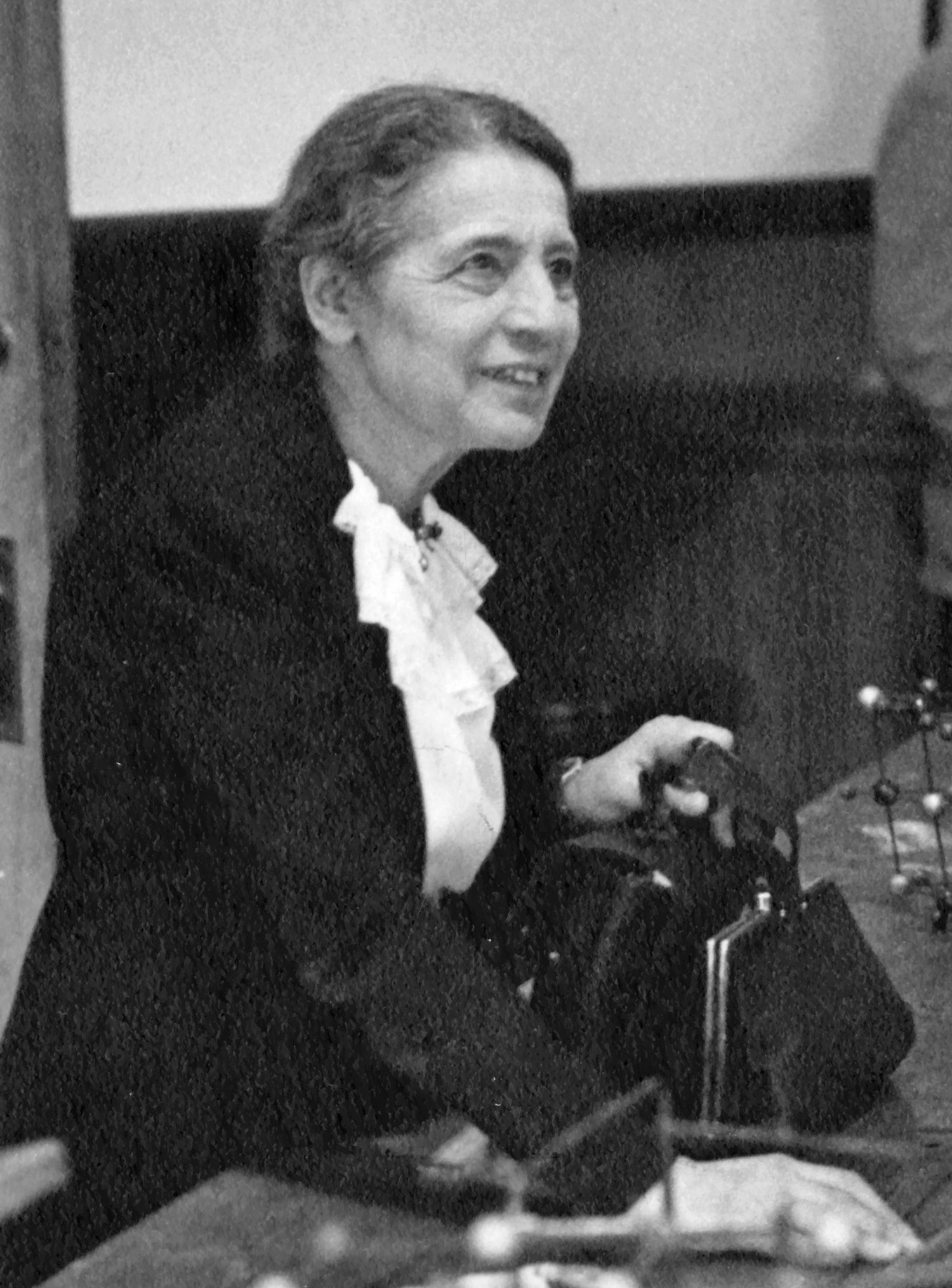
Austrian-Swedish physicist Lise Meitner

- 1930: Mexican civil engineer Concepción Mendizábal Mendoza became the first woman in Mexico to earn a civil engineering degree.
- 1930: Russian botanist and geneticist Elena Barulina published the first map of the international distribution of lentils and their wild relatives, a work that became the standard reference for researchers.
- 1932: Michiyo Tsujimura became the first Japanese woman to earn a doctorate in agriculture. She studied at the Tokyo Imperial University, and her doctoral thesis was entitled "On the Chemical Components of Green Tea".
- 1933: Hungarian scientist Elizabeth Rona received the Haitinger Prize from the Austrian Academy of Sciences for her method of extracting polonium.
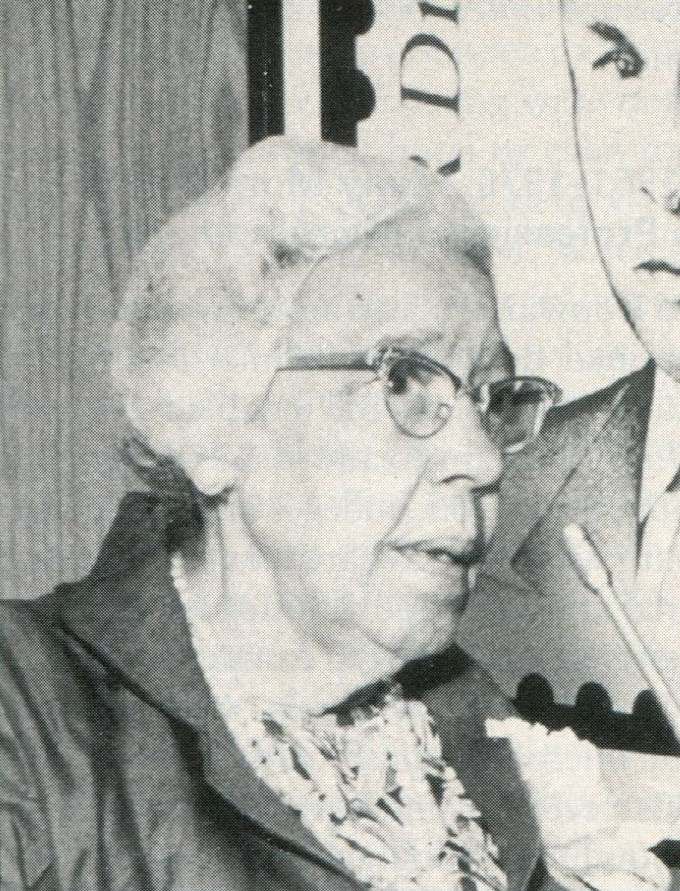
- American bacteriologist Ruth Ella Moore
  1933: American bacteriologist Ruth Ella Moore became the first African-American woman to receive a PhD in the natural sciences, completing her doctorate in bacteriology at Ohio State University.
- 1933: Egyptian medical doctor Tawhida Abdel-Rahman became the first female doctor employed by the Egyptian Government Health Ministry.
- 1935: French chemist Irène Joliot-Curie received the Nobel Prize in Chemistry along with Frédéric Joliot-Curie "for their synthesis of new radioactive elements".
- 1935: American plant hybridist Grace Sturtevant, the "First Lady of Iris", received the American Iris Society's gold medal for her lifetime's work.
- 1936: American entomologist Edith Patch became the first female president of the Entomological Society of America.
- 1936: New Zealand mycologist Kathleen Maisey Curtis was elected the first female Fellow at the Royal Society of New Zealand.
- 1936: Danish seismologist and geophysicist Inge Lehmann discovered that the Earth has a solid inner core distinct from its molten outer core.
- 1937: Canadian forensic pathologist Frances Gertrude McGill assisted the Royal Canadian Mounted Police in establishing their first forensic detection laboratory.
- 1937: Suzanne Comhaire-Sylvain became the first female Haitian anthropologist and the first Haitian person to complete a PhD, receiving her doctoral degree from the University of Paris.
- 1937: Marietta Blau and her student Hertha Wambacher, both Austrian physicists, received the Lieben Prize of the Austrian Academy of Sciences for their work on cosmic ray observations using the technique of nuclear emulsions.
- 1938: Nigerian physician Elizabeth Abimbola Awoliyi became the first woman to be licensed to practise medicine in Nigeria after graduating from Trinity College Dublin and the first West African female medical officer with a license of the Royal Surgeon (Dublin).
- 1938: Canadian geologist Alice Wilson became the first woman appointed as Fellow to the Royal Society of Canada.
- 1938: South African naturalist Marjorie Courtenay-Latimer discovered a living coelacanth fish caught near the Chalumna river. The species had been believed to be extinct for over 60 million years. It was named latimeria chalumnae in her honour.
- 1938: American botanists Elzada U Clover and Lois Jotter were the first women to catalog plant life in the Grand Canyon and the first to raft the entire length of the Colorado River
- 1939: Austrian-Swedish physicist Lise Meitner, along with Otto Hahn, led the small group of scientists who first discovered nuclear fission of uranium when it absorbed an extra neutron; the results were published in early 1939.
- 1939: French physicist Marguerite Perey discovered the chemical element francium.
- 1939: Indian biochemist Kamala Sohonie became the first Indian woman to receive a PhD in a scientific discipline in 1939.

=== 1940s ===
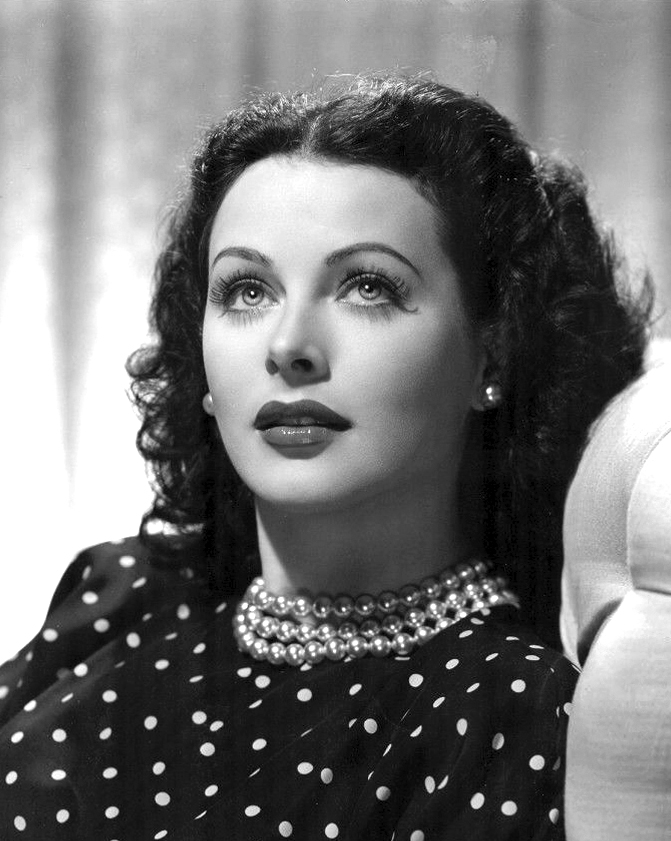
Actress and inventor Hedy Lamarr

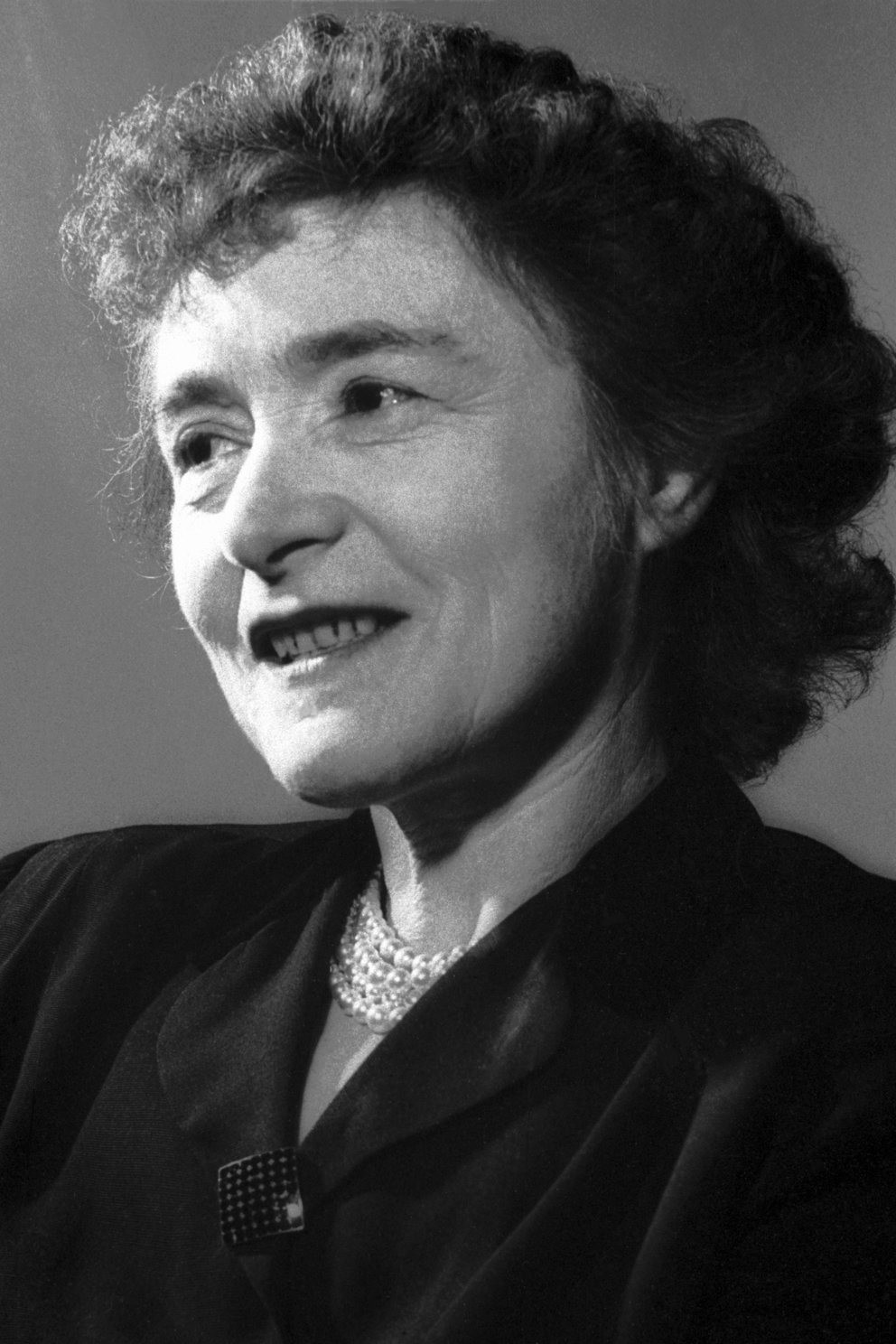
Austrian-American biochemist Gerty Cori

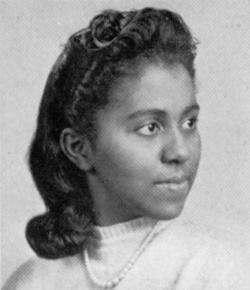
American biochemist Marie Maynard Daly

- 1940: Turkish archaeologist, Sumerologist, Assyriologist, and writer Muazzez İlmiye Çığ received her degree and began a multi-decade career at Museum of the Ancient Orient, one of three such institutions comprising Istanbul Archaeology Museums, as a resident specialist in the field of cuneiform tablets, thousands of which were being stored untranslated and unclassified in the facility's archives. In the intervening years, due to her efforts in the deciphering and publication of the tablets, the museum became a Middle Eastern languages learning center attended by ancient history researchers from every part of the world.
- 1941: American scientist Ruth Smith Lloyd became the first African-American woman to receive a PhD in anatomy.
- 1942: Austrian-American actress and inventor Hedy Lamarr and composer George Antheil developed a radio guidance system for Allied torpedoes that used spread spectrum and frequency hopping technology to defeat the threat of jamming by the Axis powers. Although the US Navy did not adopt the technology until the 1960s, the principles of their work are incorporated into Bluetooth technology and are similar to methods used in legacy versions of CDMA and Wi-Fi. This work led to their induction into the National Inventors Hall of Fame in 2014.
- 1942: American geologist Marguerite Williams became the first African-American woman to receive a PhD in geology in the United States. She completed her doctorate, entitled A History of Erosion in the Anacostia Drainage Basin, at Catholic University.
- 1942: Native American aerospace engineer Mary Golda Ross became employed at Lockheed Aircraft Corporation, where she provided troubleshooting for military aircraft. She went on to work for NASA, developing operational requirements, flight plans, and a Planetary Flight Handbook for spacecraft missions such as the Apollo program.
- 1943: British geologist Eileen Guppy was promoted to the rank of assistant geologist, therefore becoming the first female geology graduate appointed to the scientific staff of the British Geological Survey.
- 1943: American geologist and crystallographer Elizabeth A. Wood became the first female to be hired as a member of the technical staff (MTS) at Bell Telephone Laboratories in Murray Hill, New Jersey.
- 1944: Indian chemist Asima Chatterjee became the first Indian woman to receive a doctorate of science, completing her studies at the University of Calcutta. She went on to establish the Department of Chemistry at Lady Brabourne College.
- 1945: American physicists and mathematicians Frances Spence, Ruth Teitelbaum, Marlyn Meltzer, Betty Holberton, Jean Bartik and Kathleen Antonelli programmed the electronic general-purpose computer ENIAC, becoming some of the world's first computer programmers. (The first were uncredited operators, mostly members of the Women's Royal Naval Service, of the Colossus computer in 1943–1945, but that machine was not a stored-program computer and its existence was a state secret until the 1970s.)
- 1945: British biochemist Marjory Stephenson and British crystallographer Kathleen Lonsdale were elected as the first female Fellows of the Royal Society.
- 1946: British cryptanalyst Joan Clarke was appointed a Member of the Order of the British Empire (MBE) for her work as a code-breaker at Bletchley Park during World War II.
- 1947: Austrian-American biochemist Gerty Cori became the first woman to receive the Nobel Prize in Physiology or Medicine, which she received along with Carl Ferdinand Cori "for their discovery of the course of the catalytic conversion of glycogen", and Bernardo Alberto Houssay "for his discovery of the part played by the hormone of the anterior pituitary lobe in the metabolism of sugar".
- 1947: American biochemist Marie Maynard Daly became the first African-American woman to complete a PhD in chemistry in the United States. She completed her dissertation, entitled "A Study of the Products Formed by the Action of Pancreatic Amylase on Corn Starch" at Columbia University.
- 1947: Austrian physicist Berta Karlik was awarded the Haitinger Prize of the Austrian Academy of Sciences for her discovery of astatine.
- 1947: Susan Ofori-Atta became the first Ghanaian woman to earn a medical degree when she graduated from the University of Edinburgh.
- 1948: Canadian plant pathologist and mycologist Margaret Newton became the first woman to be awarded the Flavelle Medal from the Royal Society of Canada, in recognition of her extensive research in wheat rust fungal disease. Her experiments led to the development of rust-resistant strains of wheat.
- 1948: American limnologist Ruth Patrick of the Academy of Natural Sciences of Philadelphia led a multidisciplinary team of scientists on an extensive pollution survey of the Conestoga River watershed in Pennsylvania. Patrick would become a leading authority on the ecological effects of river pollution, receiving the Tyler Prize for Environmental Achievement in 1975.
- 1949: Botanist Valida Tutayug became the first Azerbaijani woman to receive a PhD in biological studies. She went on to write the first national Azerbaijani-language textbooks on botany and biology.
- 1949: American paleontologist Winifred Goldring became the first female president of the Paleontological Society. Her work included a description of stromatolites, as well as the study of Devonian crinoids. She was the first woman in the US to be appointed as a State Paleontologist.

== Late 20th century ==
=== 1950s ===
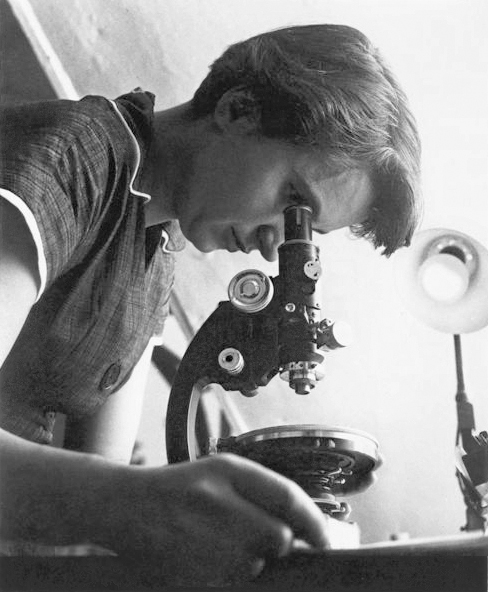
British chemist Rosalind Franklin

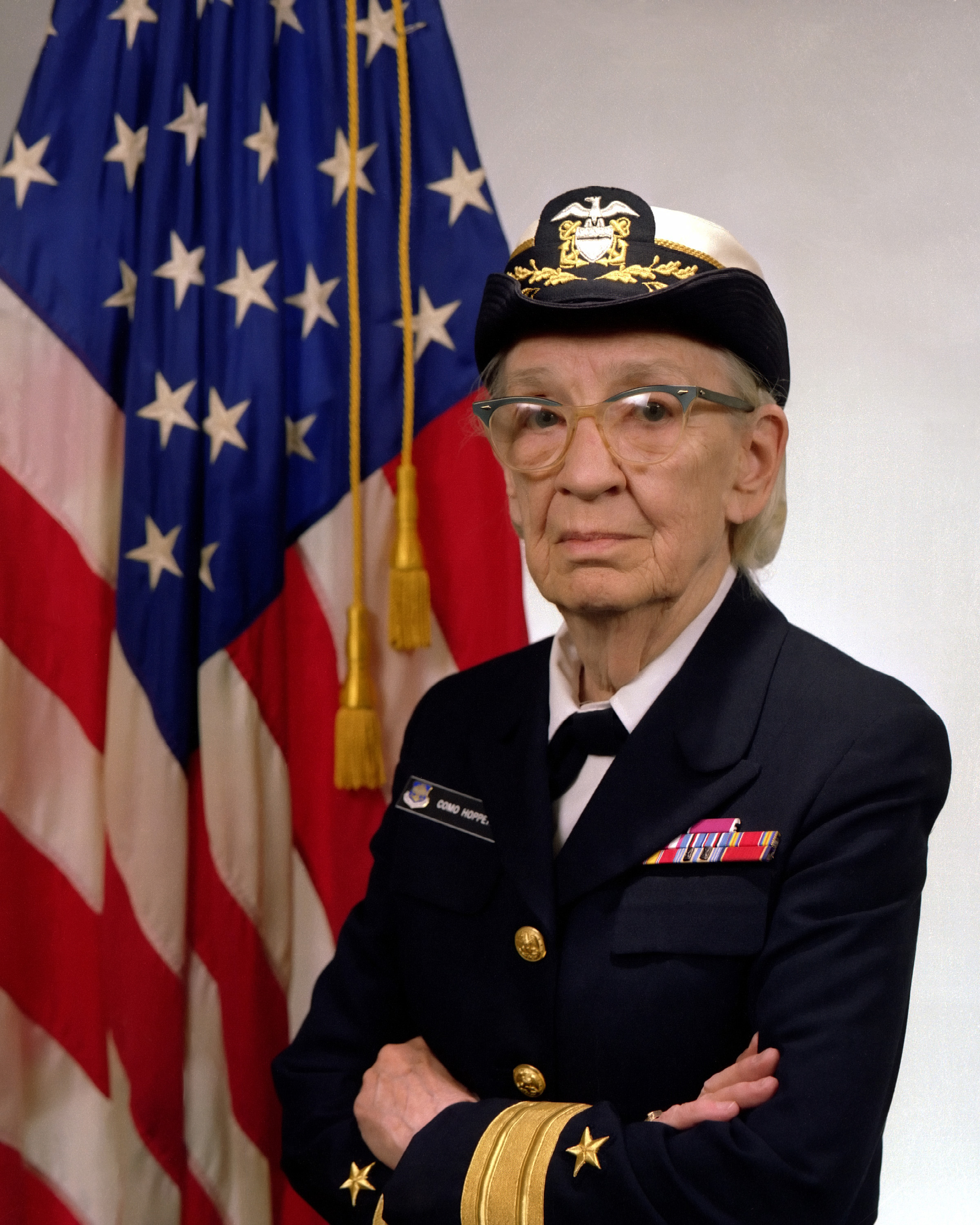
American computer scientist Grace Hopper

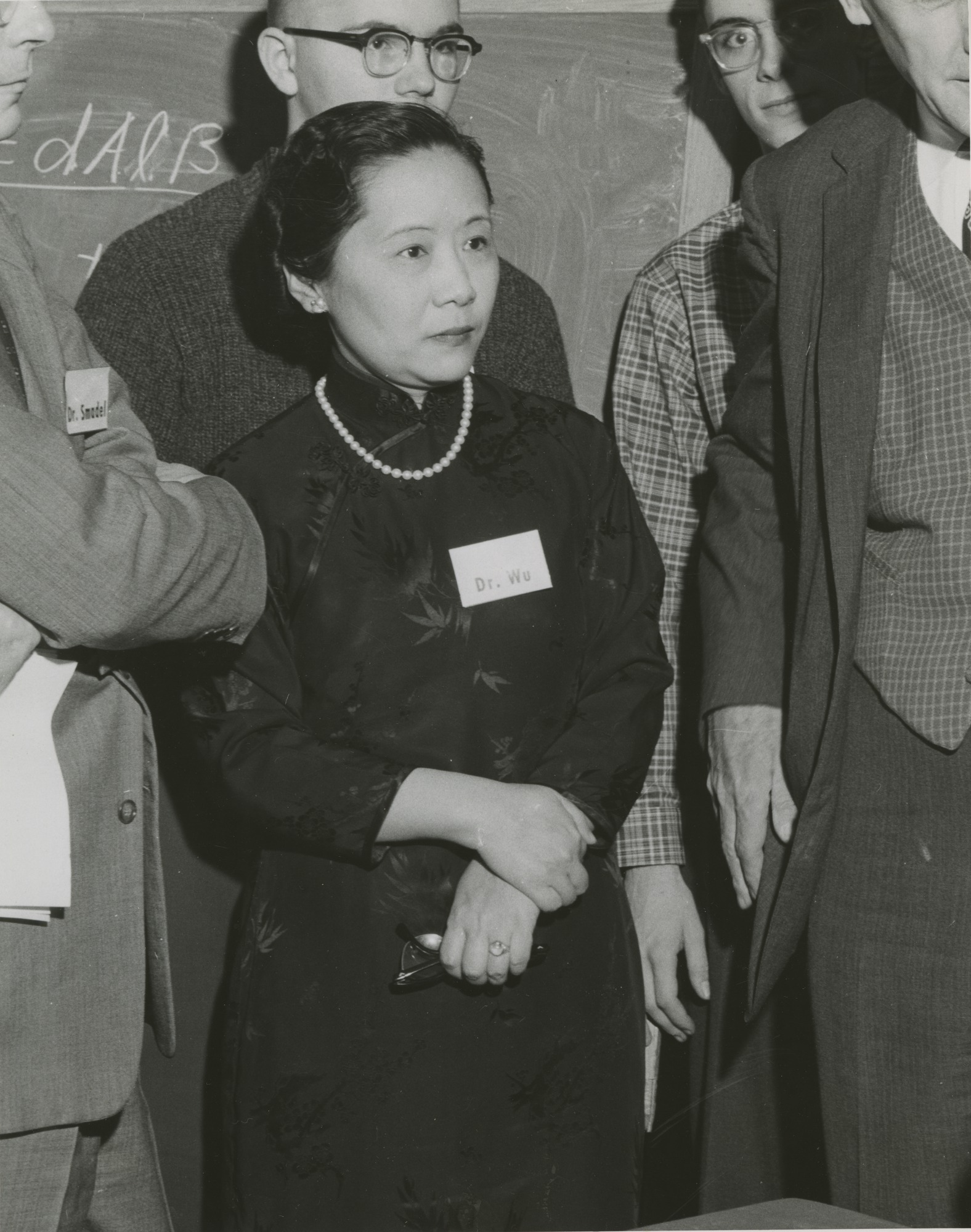
Chinese-American physicist Chien-Shiung Wu

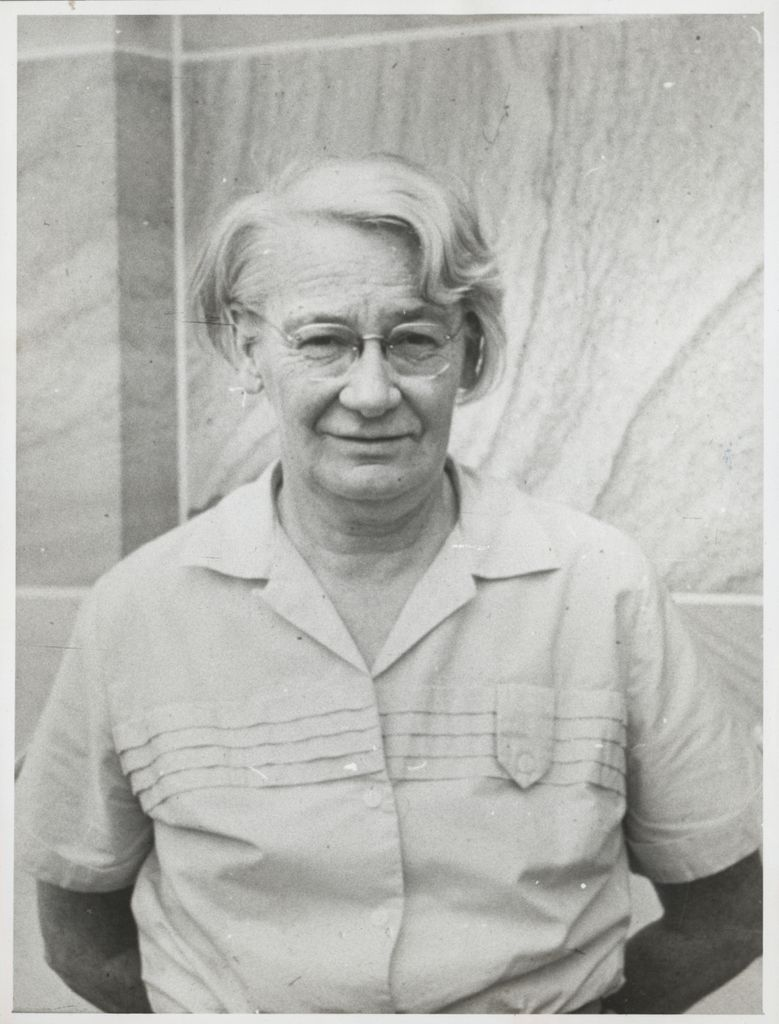
Australian geologist Dorothy Hill

- 1950s: Chinese-American medical scientist Tsai-Fan Yu co-founded a clinic at Mount Sinai Medical Center for the study and treatment of gout. Working with Alexander B. Gutman, Yu established that levels of uric acid were a factor in the pain experienced by gout patients, and subsequently developed multiple effective drugs for the treatment of gout.
- 1950: Chinese-American particle physicist Chien-Shiung Wu proved the validity of Quantum entanglement which counters Albert Einstein's EPR Paradox and published her work on the new year of the new decade. She also proved the validity of beta decay around this time.
- 1950: Ghanaian physician and science educator Matilda J. Clerk became the first woman in Ghana and West Africa to attend graduate school, earning a postgraduate diploma at the London School of Hygiene & Tropical Medicine.
- 1950: Isabella Abbott became the first Native Hawaiian woman to receive a PhD in any science; hers was in botany.
- 1950: American microbiologist Esther Lederberg became the first to isolate lambda bacteriophage, a DNA virus, from Escherichia coli K-12.
- 1951: American oncologist Jane C. Wright was the first to identify methotrexate, one of the foundational chemotherapy drugs, as an effective tool against cancerous tumors.
- 1951: Ghana's Esther Afua Ocloo became the first person of African ancestry to obtain a cooking diploma from the Good Housekeeping Institute in London and to take the post-graduate Food Preservation Course at Long Ashton Research Station, Department of Horticulture, Bristol University.
- 1952: American computer scientist Grace Hopper completed what is considered to be the first compiler, a program that allows a computer user to use a human-readable high-level programming language instead of machine code. It was known as the A-0 compiler.
- 1952: Photograph 51, an X-ray diffraction image of crystallized DNA, was taken by Raymond Gosling in May 1952, working as a PhD student under the supervision of British chemist and biophysicist Rosalind Franklin; it was critical evidence in identifying the structure of DNA.
- 1952: Canadian agriculturalist Mary MacArthur became the first female Fellow of the Agricultural Institute of Canada for her contributions to the science of food dehydration and freezing.
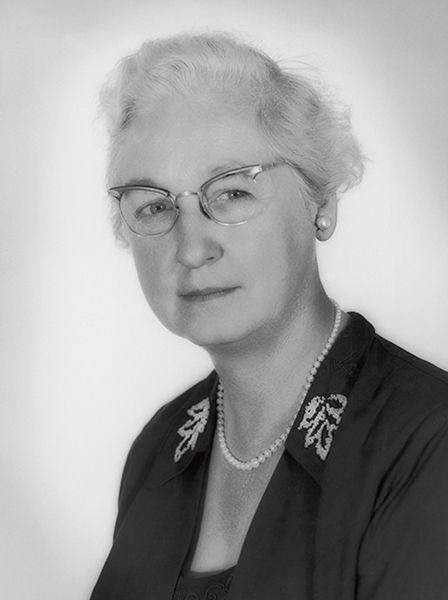
- American physician, obstetrical anaesthesiologist and medical researcher Virginia Apgar
  1952: American physician, obstetrical anesthesiologist and medical researcher Virginia Apgar devised the Apgar score, a way to quickly assess the health of a new-born child immediately after birth in order to combat infant mortality.
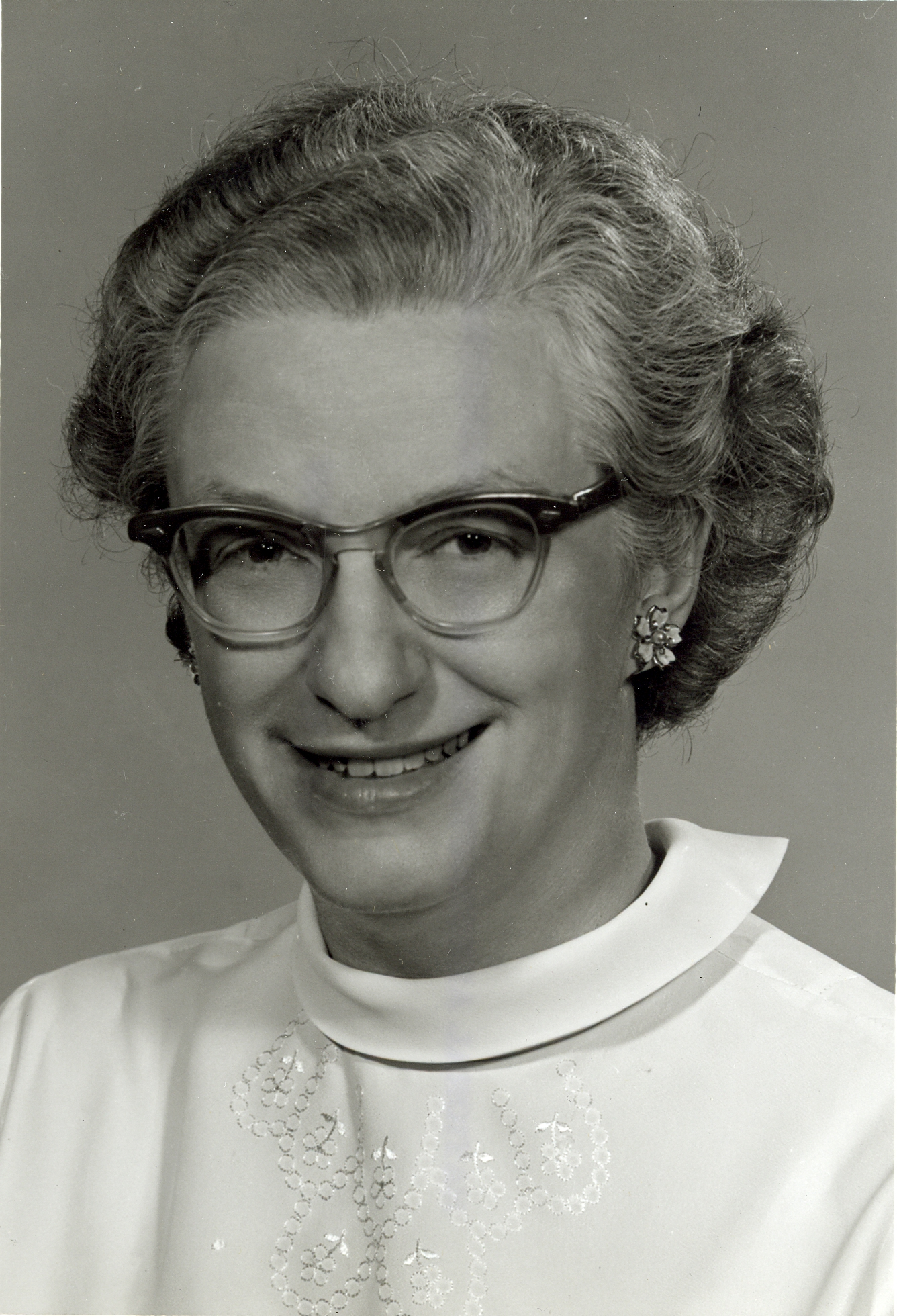
- American astronomer Nancy Roman
  1953: Canadian-British radiobiologist Alma Howard co-authored a paper proposing that cellular life transitions through four distinct periods. This became the first concept of the cell cycle.
- 1954: New Zealand botanist Lucy Cranwell was the first female recipient of the Hector Medal from the Royal Society of New Zealand. She was recognized for her pioneering work with pollen in the emerging field of palynology.
- 1955: Scottish-Canadian Arctic ice researcher Moira Dunbar became the first female glaciologist to study sea ice from a Canadian icebreaker ship.
- 1955: Japanese geochemist Katsuko Saruhashi published her research on measuring carbonic acid levels in seawater. The paper included "Saruhashi's Table", a tool of measurement she had developed that focused on using water temperature, pH level, and chlorinity to determine carbonic acid levels. Her work contributed to global understanding of climate change, and Saruhashi's Table was used by oceanographers for the next 30 years.
- 1955–1956: Soviet marine biologist Maria Klenova became the first female scientist to work in the Antarctic, conducting research and assisting in the establishment of the Mirny Antarctic station.
- 1956: Canadian zoologist and feminist Anne Innis Dagg began pioneering behavioural research on wild giraffes in South Africa in Kruger National Park. She researched and published on feminism and anti-nepotism laws at academic institutions in North America.
- 1956: Chinese-American physicist Chien-Shiung Wu conducted a nuclear physics experiment in collaboration with the Low Temperature Group of the US National Bureau of Standards. It was an important foundation for the Standard Model in particle physics and brought the first answer to the question of the universe's existence by virtue of matter's predominance over antimatter. The experiment, becoming known as the Wu experiment, showed that parity could be violated in weak interaction. The Nobel Prize was given only to her male colleagues soon after the headlines of the discovery were released.
- 1956: Australian geologist and palaeontologist Dorothy Hill became the first Australian woman elected a Fellow of the Australian Academy of Science.
- 1956: English zoologist and geneticist Margaret Bastock published the first evidence that a single gene could change behavior.
- 1957–1958: Chinese scientist Lanying Lin produced China's first germanium and silicon mono-crystals, subsequently pioneering new techniques in semiconductor development.
- 1959: Chinese astronomer Ye Shuhua led the development of the Joint Chinese Universal Time System, which became the Chinese national standard for measuring universal time.
- 1959: Susan Ofori-Atta, the first female Ghanaian physician, became a founding member of the Ghana Academy of Arts and Sciences.
- 1959: American astronomer Nancy Roman, known as "Mother of the Hubble" for her work on the early stages of the Hubble Space Telescope, was recruited by NASA to be its first chief of astronomy.

=== 1960s ===
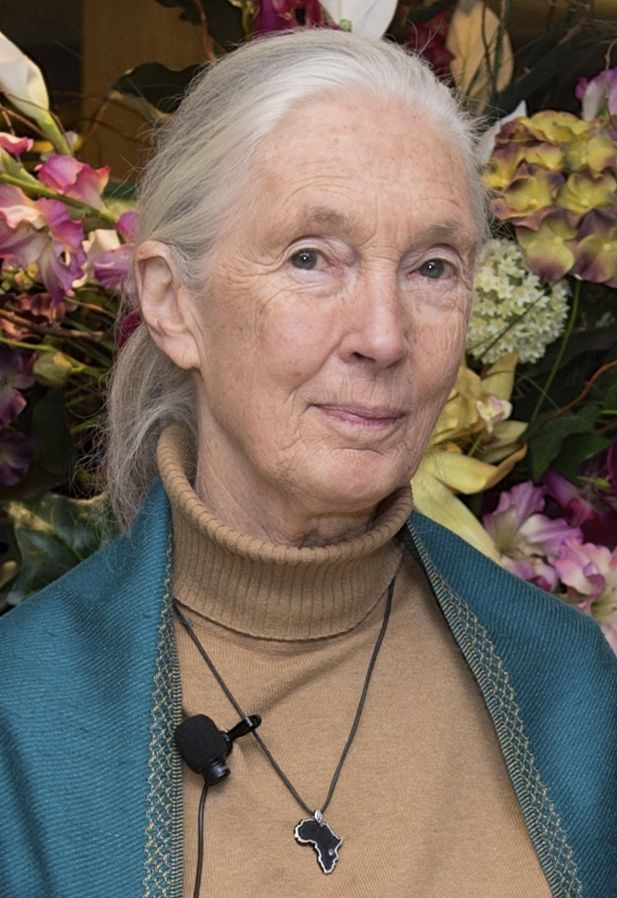
British primatologist Jane Goodall

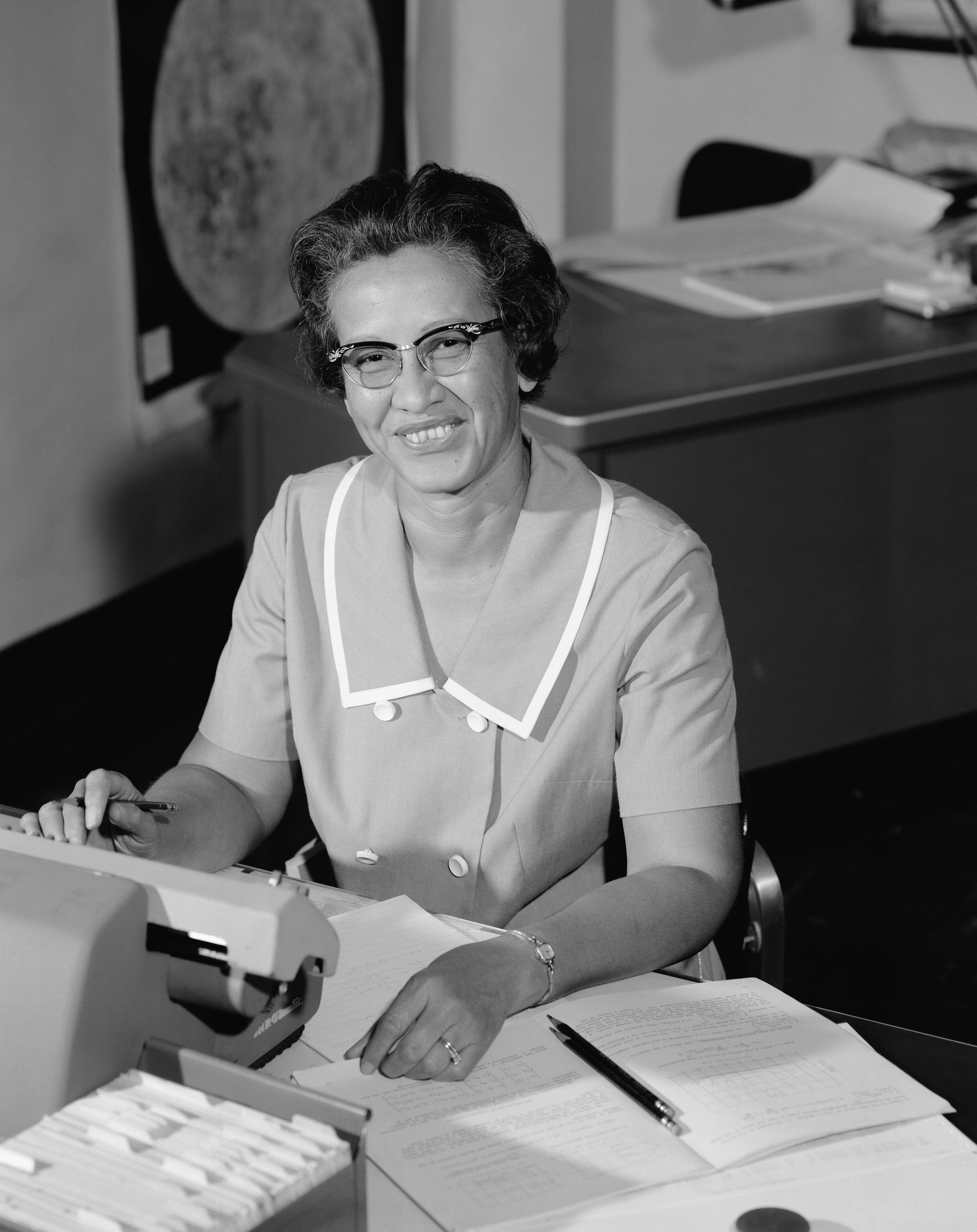
American NASA scientist Katherine Johnson

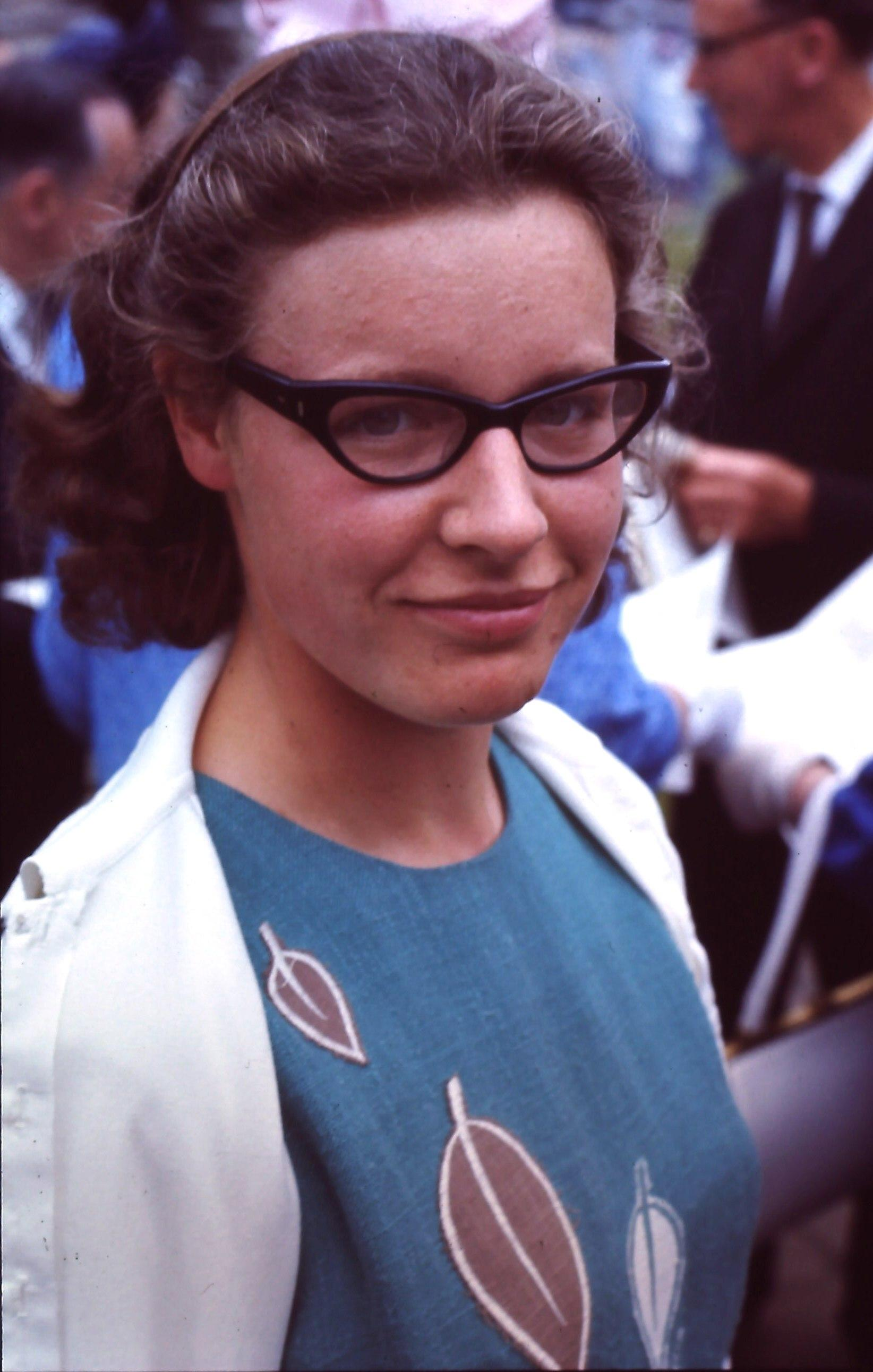
British astrophysicist Jocelyn Bell Burnell

- 1960: British primatologist Jane Goodall began studying chimpanzees in Tanzania; her study of them continued for over 50 years. Her observations challenged previous ideas that only humans made tools and that chimpanzees had a basically vegetarian diet.
- Early 1960s: German-Canadian metallurgist Ursula Franklin studied levels of radioactive isotope strontium-90 that were appearing in the teeth of children as a side effect of nuclear weapons testing fallout. Her research influenced the Partial Nuclear Test Ban Treaty of 1963.
- 1960s: American mathematician Katherine Johnson calculated flight paths at NASA for crewed space flights.
- 1961: Indian chemist Asima Chatterjee became the first female recipient of a Shanti Swarup Bhatnagar Prize. She was recognized in the Chemical Sciences category for her contributions to phytomedicine.
- 1962: Rachel Louise Carson was an American marine biologist, author, and conservationist whose book Silent Spring and other writings are credited with advancing the global environmental movement.
- 1962: South African botanist Margaret Levyns became the first female president of the Royal Society of South Africa.
- 1962: French physicist Marguerite Perey became the first female Fellow elected to the Académie des Sciences.
- 1963: Elsa G. Vilmundardóttir became the first female Icelandic geologist, completing her studies at Stockholm University.
- 1963: Maria Goeppert Mayer became the first American woman to receive a Nobel Prize in Physics; she shared the prize with J. Hans D. Jensen "for their discoveries concerning nuclear shell structure" and Eugene Paul Wigner "for his contributions to the theory of the atomic nucleus and the elementary particles, particularly through the discovery and application of fundamental symmetry principles".
- 1964: American mathematician Irene Stegun completed the work which led to the publication of Handbook of Mathematical Functions, a widely used and widely cited reference work in applied mathematics.
- English chemist Dorothy Mary Hodgkin
  1964: British chemist Dorothy Crowfoot Hodgkin received the Nobel Prize in Chemistry "for her determinations by X-ray techniques of the structures of important biochemical substances".
- 1964: Egyptian physician and medical geneticist Nemat Hashem established the first medical genetics clinic in the Arab world at Ain Shams University in Cairo.
- 1964: Scottish virologist June Almeida made the first identification of a human coronavirus.
- 1965: Sister Mary Kenneth Keller became the first American woman to receive a Ph.D. in computer science. Her thesis was titled "Inductive Inference on Computer Generated Patterns".
- 1966: Japanese immunologist Teruko Ishizaka, working with Kimishige Ishizaka, discovered the antibody class Immunoglobulin E (IgE).
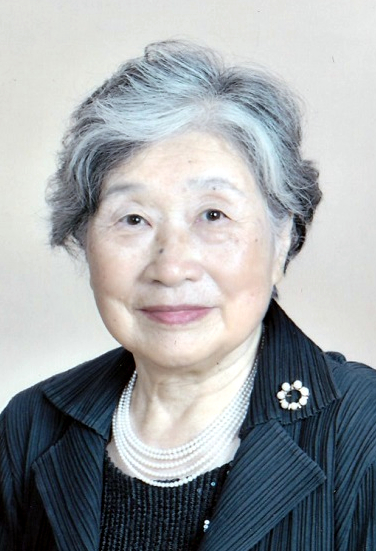
- Japanese molecular biologist Tsuneko Okazaki
  1966: Serbian astrophysicist Mirjana Vukićević-Karabin founded the School of Astrophysics at the University of Belgrade
- 1966: Irish chemist Eva Philbin became the first woman president of the Institute of Chemistry of Ireland.
- 1967: British astrophysicist Jocelyn Bell Burnell co-discovered the first radio pulsars.
- 1967: Sue Arnold became the first female British Geological Survey person to go to sea on a research vessel.
- 1967: South African radiobiologist Tikvah Alper discovered that scrapie, an infectious brain disease affecting sheep, did not spread via DNA or RNA like a viral or bacterial disease. The discovery enabled scientists to better understand diseases caused by prions.
- 1967: Yvonne Brill, a Canadian-American rocket and jet propulsion engineer, invented the hydrazine resistojet propulsion system.
- 1968: Japanese pioneer of molecular biology Tsuneko Okazaki studied DNA replication and discovered Okazaki fragments.
- 1969: British biostratigrapher Beris Cox became the first female paleontologist in the British Geological Survey.
- 1969: British botanist Irene Manton became the first woman president of the British Pteridological Society.
- 1969: Ukrainian-born astronomer Svetlana Gerasimenko co-discovered the 67P/Churyumov–Gerasimenko comet.
- 1969: A group of women scientists from the United States (Lois Jones, Terry Tickhill, Kay Lindsay, Eileen McSaveney, and Jean Pearson) and New Zealand (Pamela Young) become the first women to visit and work at the South Pole.

=== 1970s ===
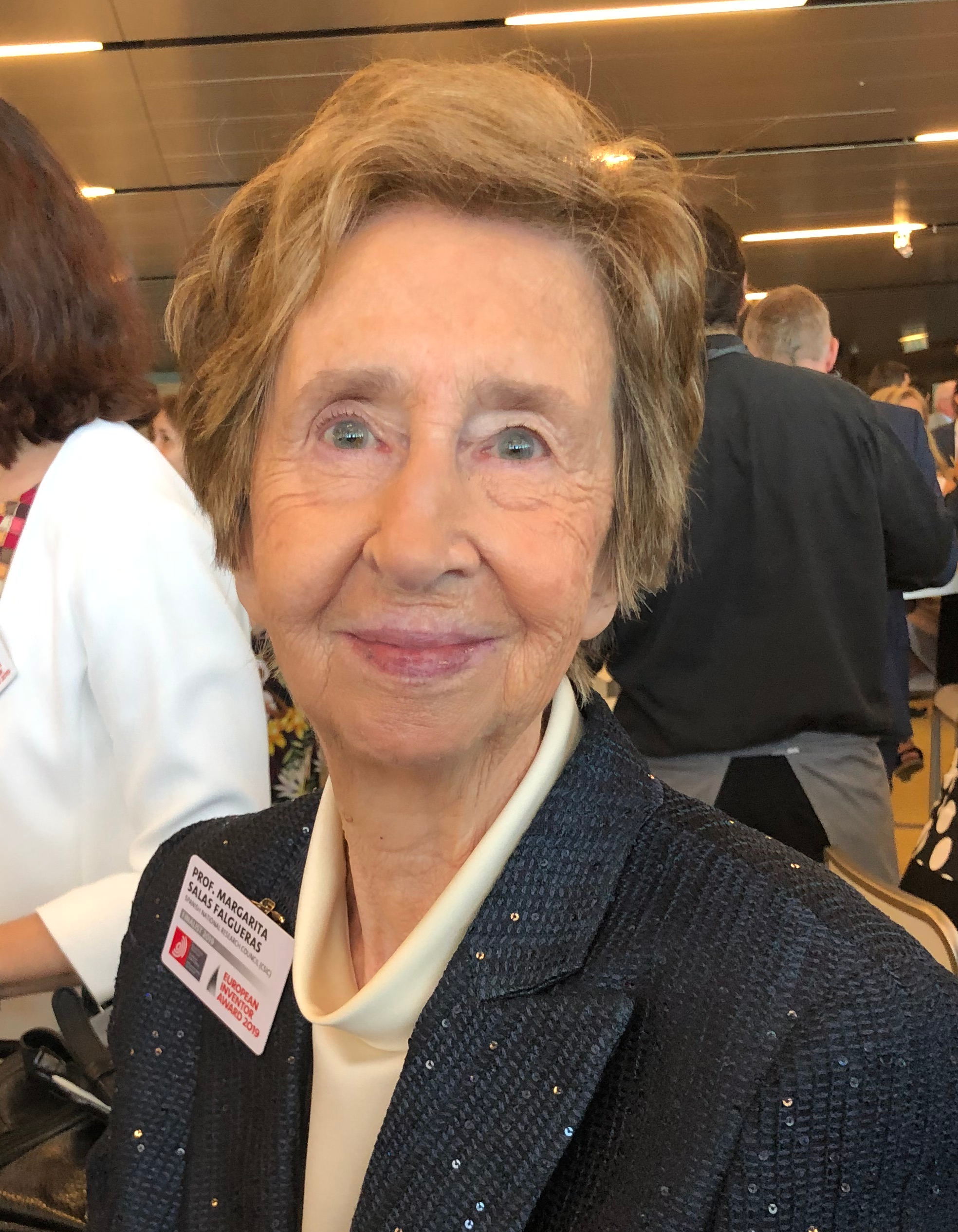
- Spanish biochemist Margarita Salas
  1970: Australian geologist and palaeontologist Dorothy Hill became the first female president of the Australian Academy of Science.
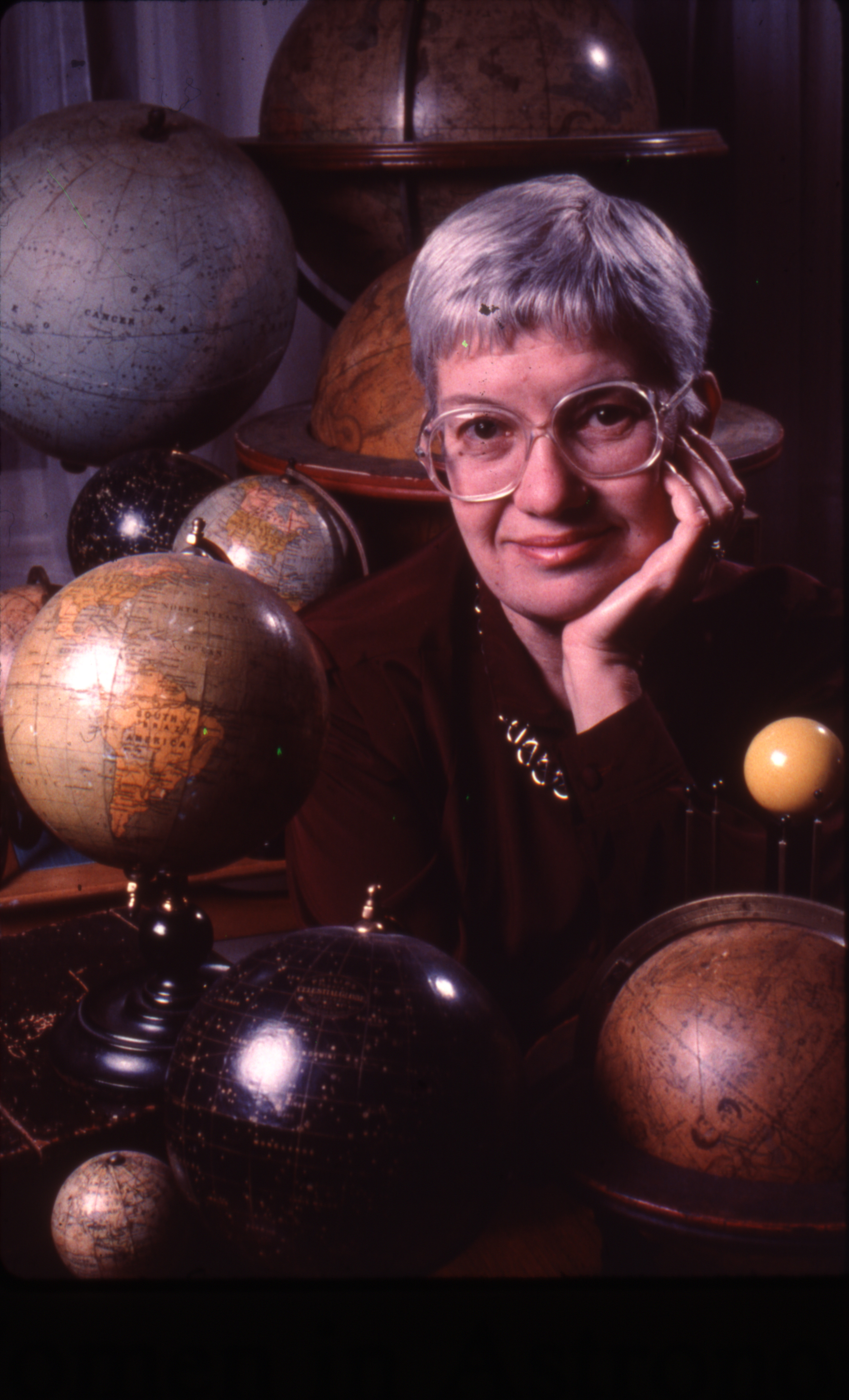
- American astronomer Vera Rubin
  1970: New Zealand geologist and palynologist Rosemary Askin the first New Zealand woman to undertake her own research programme in Antarctica.
- 1970: Spanish biochemist Margarita Salas discovered and characterized the Φ29 phage DNA polymerase. She was also the first scientific woman elected to the Royal Spanish Academy and was the first woman recipient of the Carlos J. Finlay Prize for Microbiology.
- 1970: Samira Islam became the first Saudi Arabian person to earn a PhD in pharmacology.
- 1970: American astronomer Vera Rubin published the first evidence for dark matter.
- 1970: Polish geologist Franciszka Szymakowska became widely known because of her unique and detailed geological drawings that are still used today.
- 1971: Romanian chemist Ecaterina Ciorănescu-Nenițescu became a member of the New York Chemical Society. She was noted for developing synthesis processes for antituberculosis drugs and insecticides and creating new substances using cytostatic grafting.
- 1973: American physicist Anna Coble became the first African-American woman to receive a PhD in biophysics, completing her dissertation at University of Illinois.
- 1974: Dominican marine biologist Idelisa Bonnelly founded the Dominican Republic Academy of Science.
- 1975: Indian chemist Asima Chatterjee was elected the General President of the Indian Science Congress Association. She simultaneously became the first female scientist ever elected a member of the congress.
- 1975: Indian geneticist Archana Sharma received the Shanti Swarup Bhatnagar Prize, the first female recipient in the Biological Sciences category.
- 1975: Female officers of the British Geological Survey no longer had to resign upon getting married.
- 1975: Chien-Shiung Wu became the first female president of the American Physical Society.
- 1976: Filipino-American microbiologist Roseli Ocampo-Friedmann traveled to the Antarctic with Imre Friedmann and discovered micro-organisms living within the porous rock of the Ross Desert. These organisms – cryptoendoliths – were observed surviving extremely low temperatures and humidity, assisting scientific research into the possibility of life on Mars.
- 1976: Margaret Burbidge was named the first female president of the American Astronomical Society.
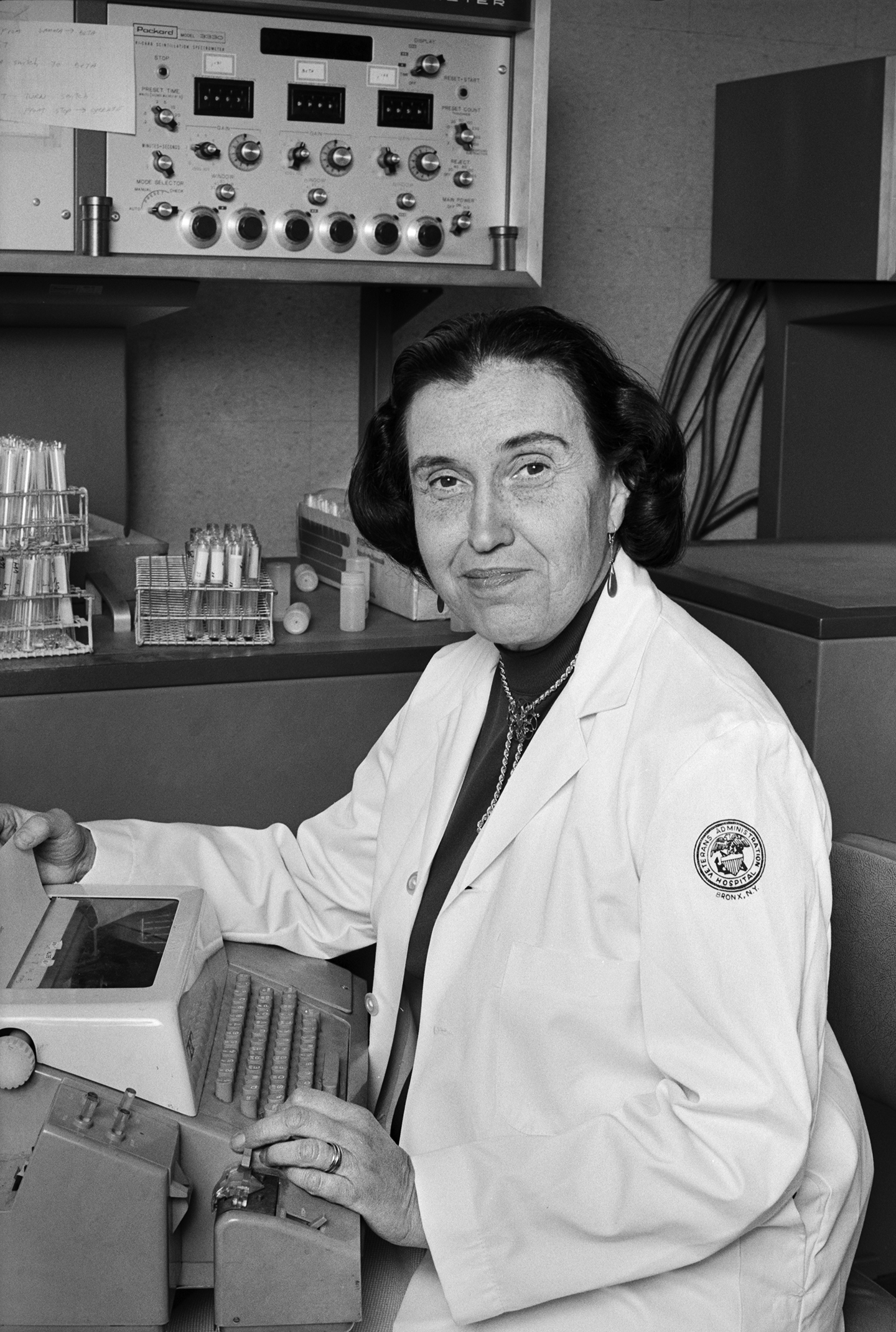
- American medical physicist Rosalyn Yalow
  1977: American medical physicist Rosalyn Yalow received the Nobel Prize in Physiology or Medicine "for the development of radioimmunoassays of peptide hormones" along with Roger Guillemin and Andrew V. Schally who received it "for their discoveries concerning the peptide hormone production of the brain".
- 1977: Austrian naturalist, artist and author Joy Adamson was awarded the Austrian Cross of Honour for Science and Art. Her book, Born Free, an international bestseller, describes her experiences raising a lion cub named Elsa. It was made into an Academy Award-winning film of the same name.
- 1977: The Association for Women Geoscientists was founded.
- 1977: Argentine-Canadian scientist Veronica Dahl became the first graduate at Université d'Aix-Marseille II (and one of the first women in the world) to earn a PhD in artificial intelligence.
- 1977: Canadian-American Elizabeth Stern published her research on the link between birth control pills – which contained high levels of estrogen at the time – and the increased risk of cervical cancer development in women. Her data helped pressure the pharmaceutical industry into providing safer contraceptive pills with lower hormone doses.
- 1977: Janina Oszast is among the first Polish palaeobotanists attempting biogeographic synthesis of Miocene land sediments. She was also the first person in Poland to identify pollen from a range of herbaceous plants and the first to find pollen grains of Ephedra in glaciation period deposits.
- 1978: Anna Jane Harrison became the first female president of the American Chemical Society.
- 1978: American biochemist Mildred Cohn served as the first female president of the American Society for Biochemistry and Molecular Biology, then called the American Society of Biological Chemists.

=== 1980s ===
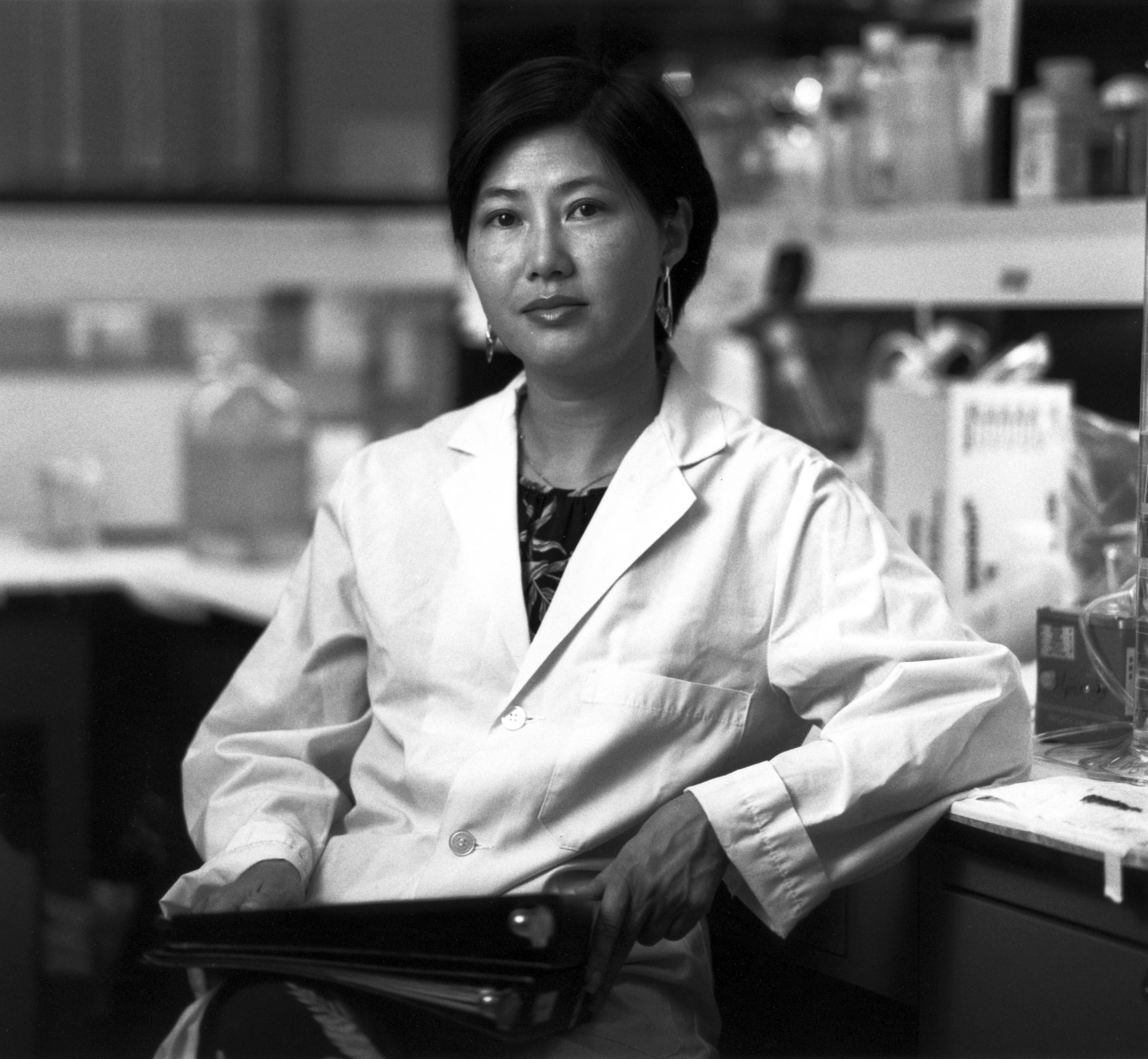
Chinese-American virologist and molecular biologist Flossie Wong-Staal

- 1980: Japanese geochemist Katsuko Saruhashi became the first woman elected to the Science Council of Japan.
- 1980: Nigerian geophysicist Deborah Ajakaiye became the first woman in any West African country to be appointed a full professor of physics. Over the course of her scientific career, she became the first female Fellow elected to the Nigerian Academy of Science, and the first female dean of science in Nigeria.
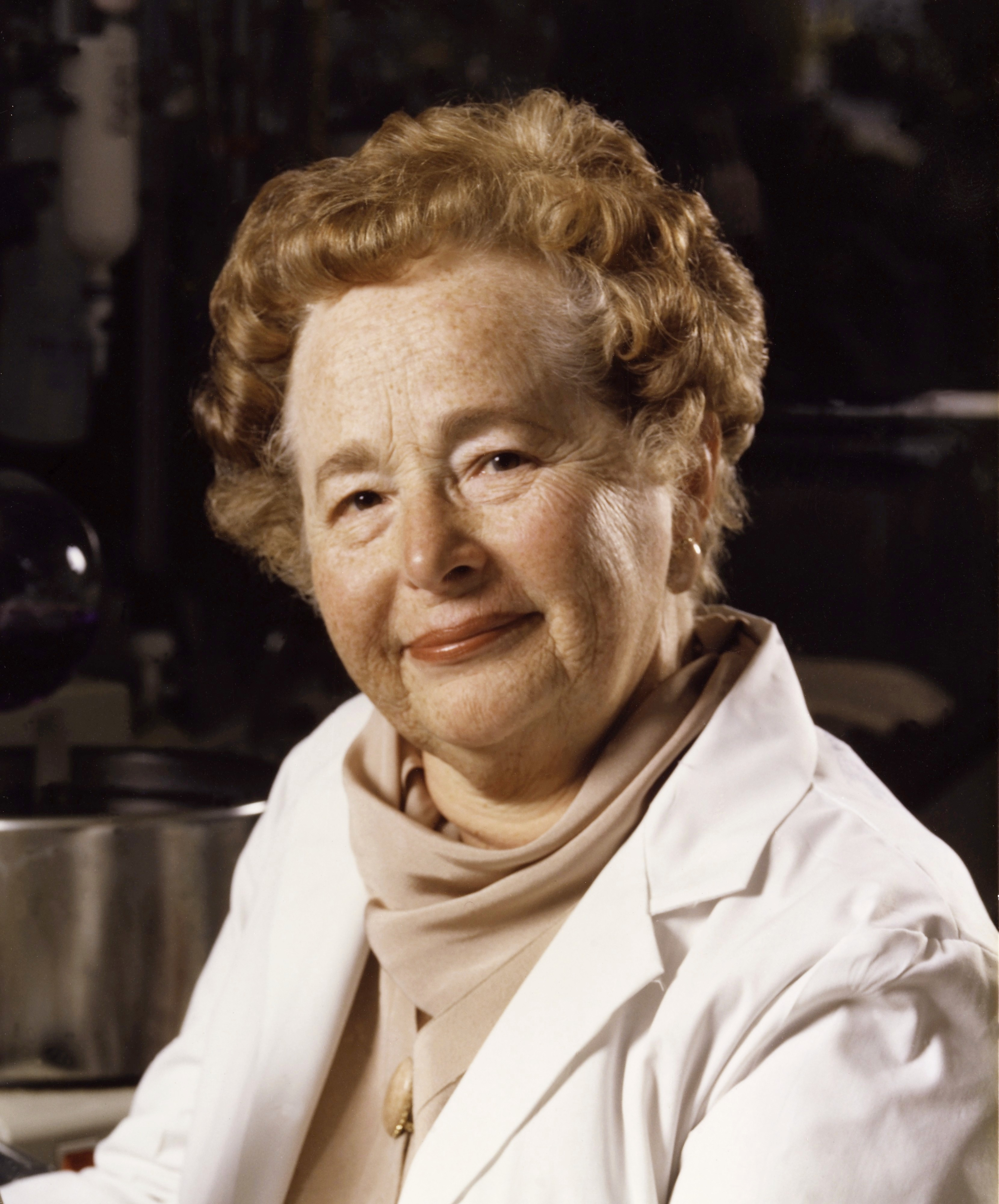
- American biochemist and pharmacologist Gertrude Elion
  1981: Vera Rubin was the second female astronomer elected to the National Academy of Science. Beginning her academic career as the sole undergraduate in astronomy at Vassar College, Rubin went on to graduate studies at Cornell University and Georgetown University, where she observed deviations from Hubble flow in galaxies and provided evidence for the existence of galactic superclusters.
- 1982: Nephrologist Leah Lowenstein became the first female dean of a co-educational medical school in the United States.
- 1982: British geologist Janet Vida Watson FRS was elected president of the Geological Society of London, the first woman to occupy that position.
- 1983: American cytogeneticist Barbara McClintock received the Nobel Prize in Physiology or Medicine for her discovery of genetic transposition; she was the first woman to receive that prize without sharing it, and the first American woman to receive any unshared Nobel Prize.
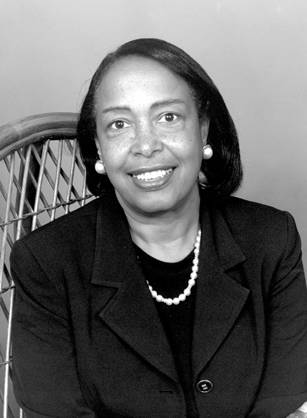
- American ophthalmologist and inventor Patricia Bath
  1983: Brazilian agronomist Johanna Döbereiner became a founding Fellow of the World Academy of Sciences.
- 1983: Indian immunologist Indira Nath became the first female scientist to receive the Shanti Swaroop Bhatnagar Award in the Medical Sciences category.
- 1983: Geologist Sudipta Sengupta and marine biologist Aditi Pant became the first Indian women to visit the Antarctic.
- 1984: American computer scientist and engineer Thelma Estrin, one of the first scientists to apply computer technology to healthcare and medical research, is awarded the IEEE Centennial Medal.
- 1985: After identifying HIV as the cause of AIDS, Chinese-American virologist Flossie Wong-Staal became the first scientist to clone and genetically map the HIV virus, enabling the development of the first HIV blood screening tests.
- 1986: Italian neurologist Rita Levi-Montalcini received the Nobel Prize in Physiology or Medicine, shared with Stanley Cohen, "for their discoveries of growth factors".
- 1988: American biochemist and pharmacologist Gertrude B. Elion received the Nobel Prize in Physiology or Medicine along with James W. Black and George H. Hitchings "for their discoveries of important principles for drug treatment".
- 1988: American scientist and inventor Patricia Bath (born 1942) became the first African-American to patent a medical device, namely the Laserphaco Probe for improving the use of lasers to remove cataracts.

=== 1990s ===
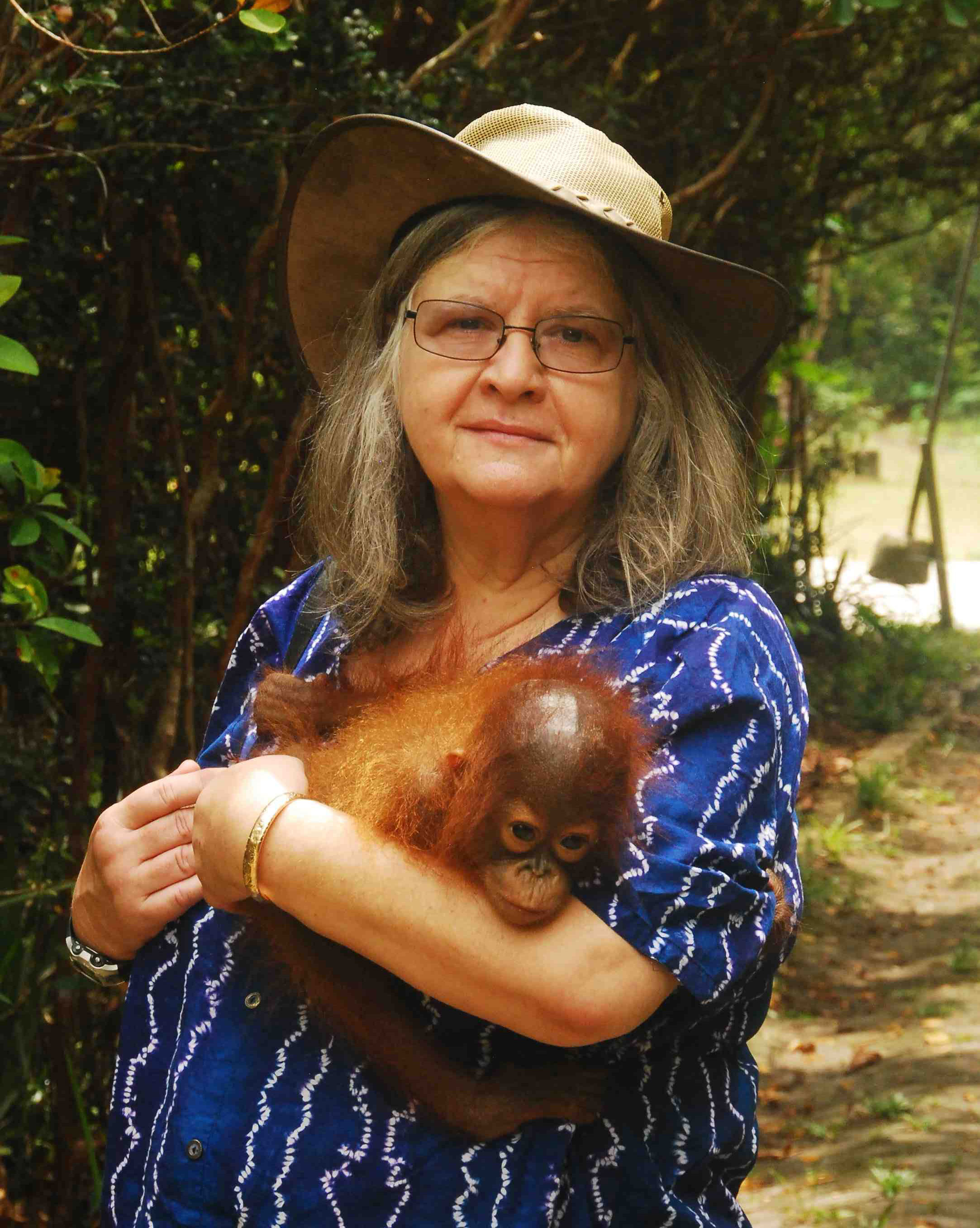
Lithuanian-Canadian primatologist Birutė Galdikas

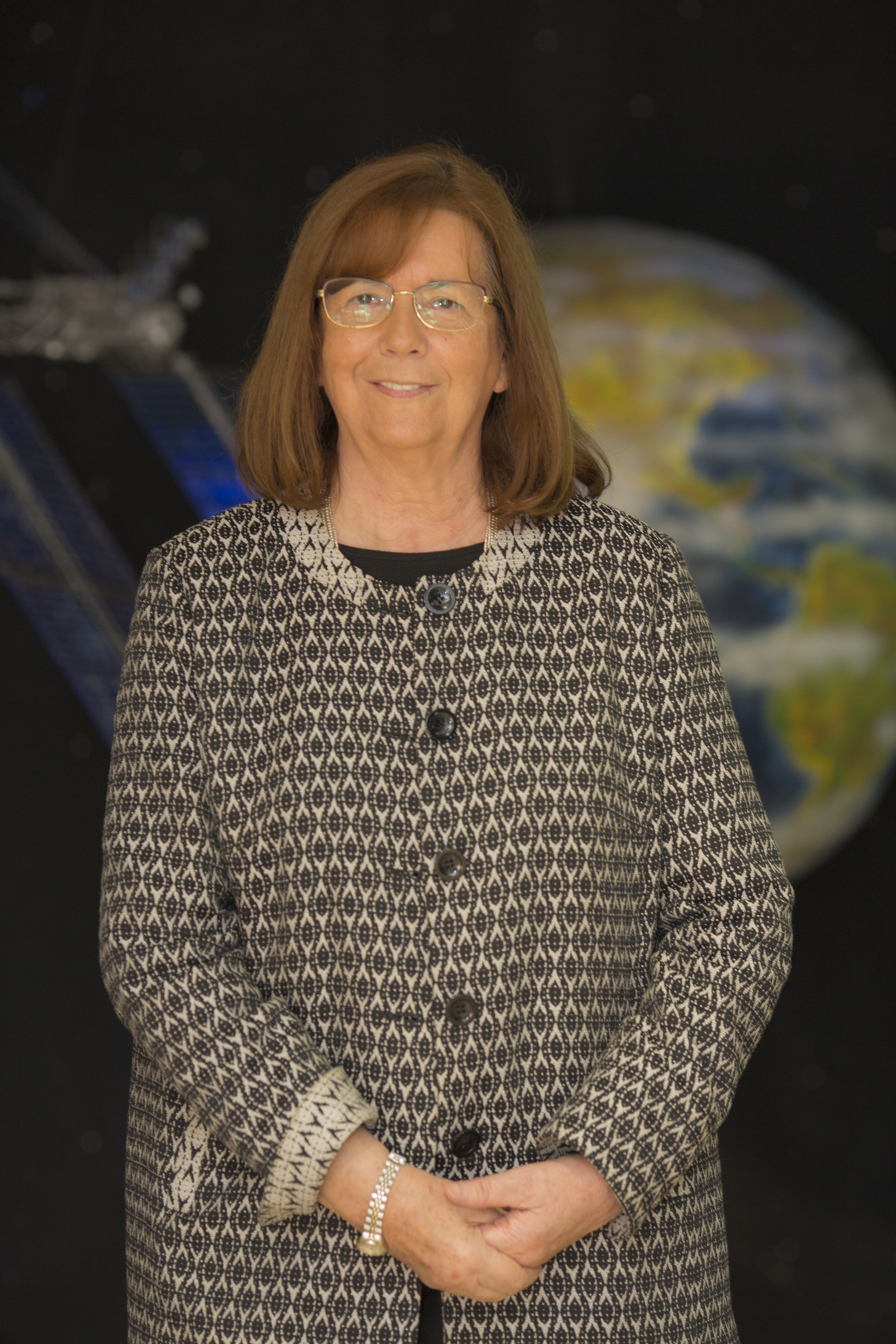
Chilean astronomer María Teresa Ruiz

- 1991: Doris Malkin Curtis became the first female president of the Geological Society of America.
- 1991: Indian geologist Sudipta Sengupta became the first female scientist to receive the Shanti Swaroop Bhatnagar Award in the Earth Sciences category.
- 1991; British chemist and cosmonaut Helen Patricia Sharman became the first woman to visit the Mir space station in May 1991.
- 1992: American engineer, physician, and NASA astronaut Mae Carol Jemison became the first black woman to travel into space when she served as a mission specialist aboard the Space Shuttle Endeavour. Jemison joined NASA's astronaut corps in 1987 and was selected to serve for the STS-47 mission, during which she orbited the Earth for nearly eight days on September 12–20, 1992.
- 1992: American chemist Edith M. Flanigen became the first woman awarded the Perkin Medal (widely considered the highest honor in American industrial chemistry) for her outstanding achievements in applied chemistry. The medal especially recognized her syntheses of aluminophosphate and silicoaluminophosphate molecular sieves as new classes of materials.
- 1993: American molecular biologist and biogerontologist Cynthia Kenyon discovered that a single-gene mutation (Daf-2) could double the lifespan of C. elegans, and that this could be reversed by a second mutation in daf-16m.
- 1995: German biologist Christiane Nüsslein-Volhard received the Nobel Prize in Physiology or Medicine, shared with Edward B. Lewis and Eric F. Wieschaus, "for their discoveries concerning the genetic control of early embryonic development".
- 1995: British geomorphologist Marjorie Sweeting published the first comprehensive Western account of China's karst, entitled Karst in China: its Geomorphology and Environment.
- 1995: Israeli-Canadian mathematical biologist Leah Keshet became the first female president of the international Society for Mathematical Biology.
- 1995: British geochemist Jane Plant became the first female deputy director of the British Geological Survey.
- 1995: Inspectors from the United Nations Special Commission discovered that Iraqi microbiologist Rihab Taha, nicknamed "Dr. Germ", had been overseeing a secret 10-year biological warfare development program in Iraq.
- 1996: American planetary scientist Margaret G. Kivelson led a team that discovered the first subsurface, saltwater ocean on an alien world, on the Jovian moon Europa.
- 1997: Lithuanian-Canadian primatologist Birutė Galdikas received the Tyler Prize for Environmental Achievement for her research and rehabilitation work with orangutans. Her work with orangutans, eventually spanning over 30 years, was later recognized in 2014 as one of the longest continuous scientific studies of wild animals in history.
- 1997: Chilean astronomer María Teresa Ruiz discovered Kelu 1, one of the first observed brown dwarfs. In recognition of her discovery, she became the first woman to receive the Chilean National Prize for Exact Sciences.
- 1998: Nurse Fannie Gaston-Johansson became the first African-American woman tenured full professor at Johns Hopkins University.
- Late 1990s: Ethiopian-American chemist Sossina M. Haile developed the first solid acid fuel cell.

== 21st century ==
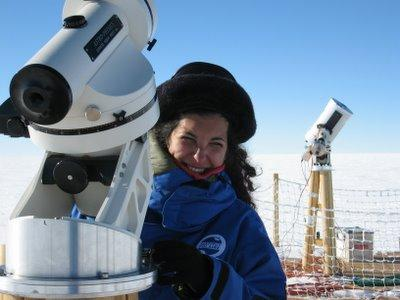
Moroccan astronomer Merieme Chadid

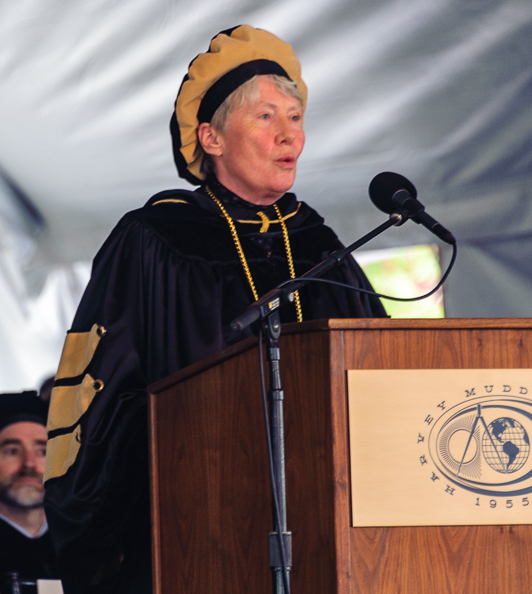
Canadian-American computer scientist Maria Klawe

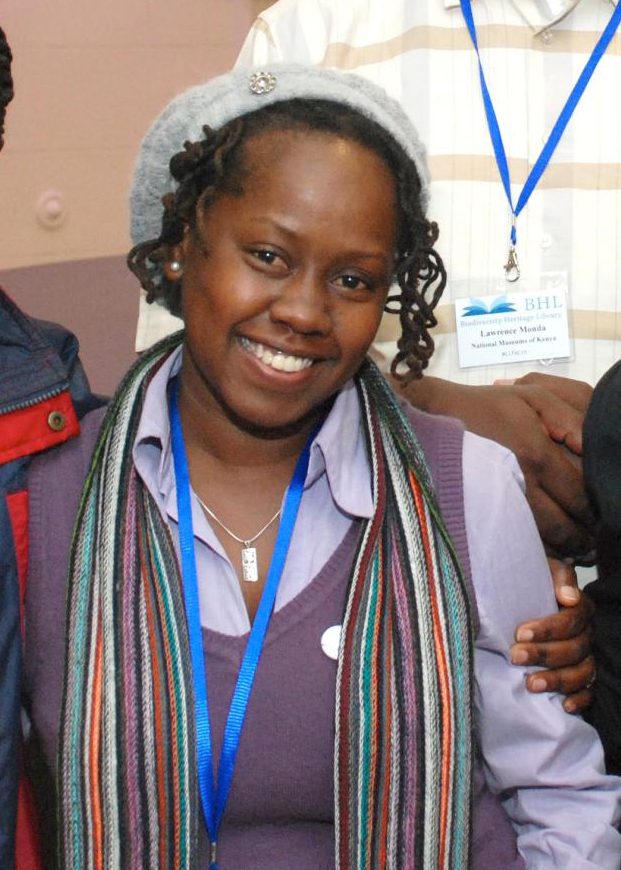
Kenyan ichthyologist Dorothy Wanja Nyingi

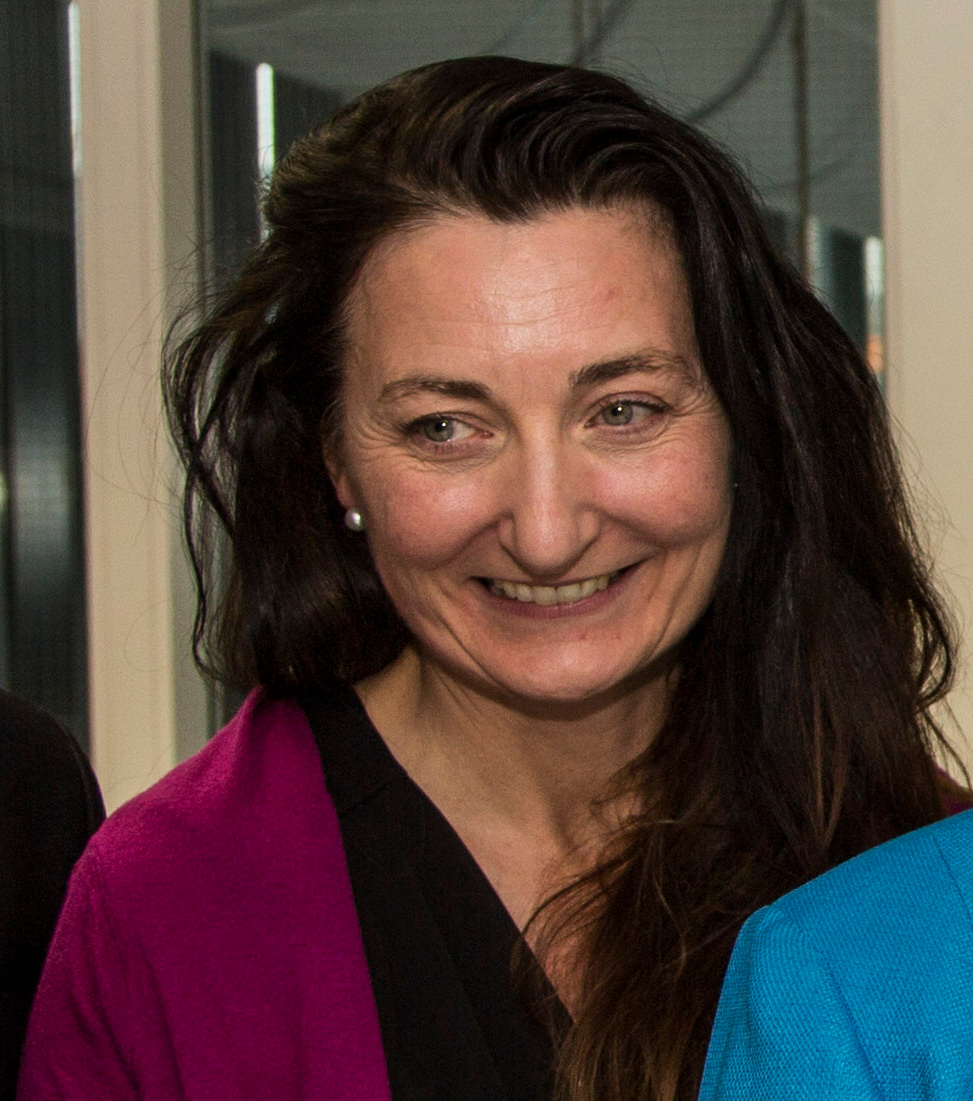
Norwegian neuroscientist May-Britt Moser

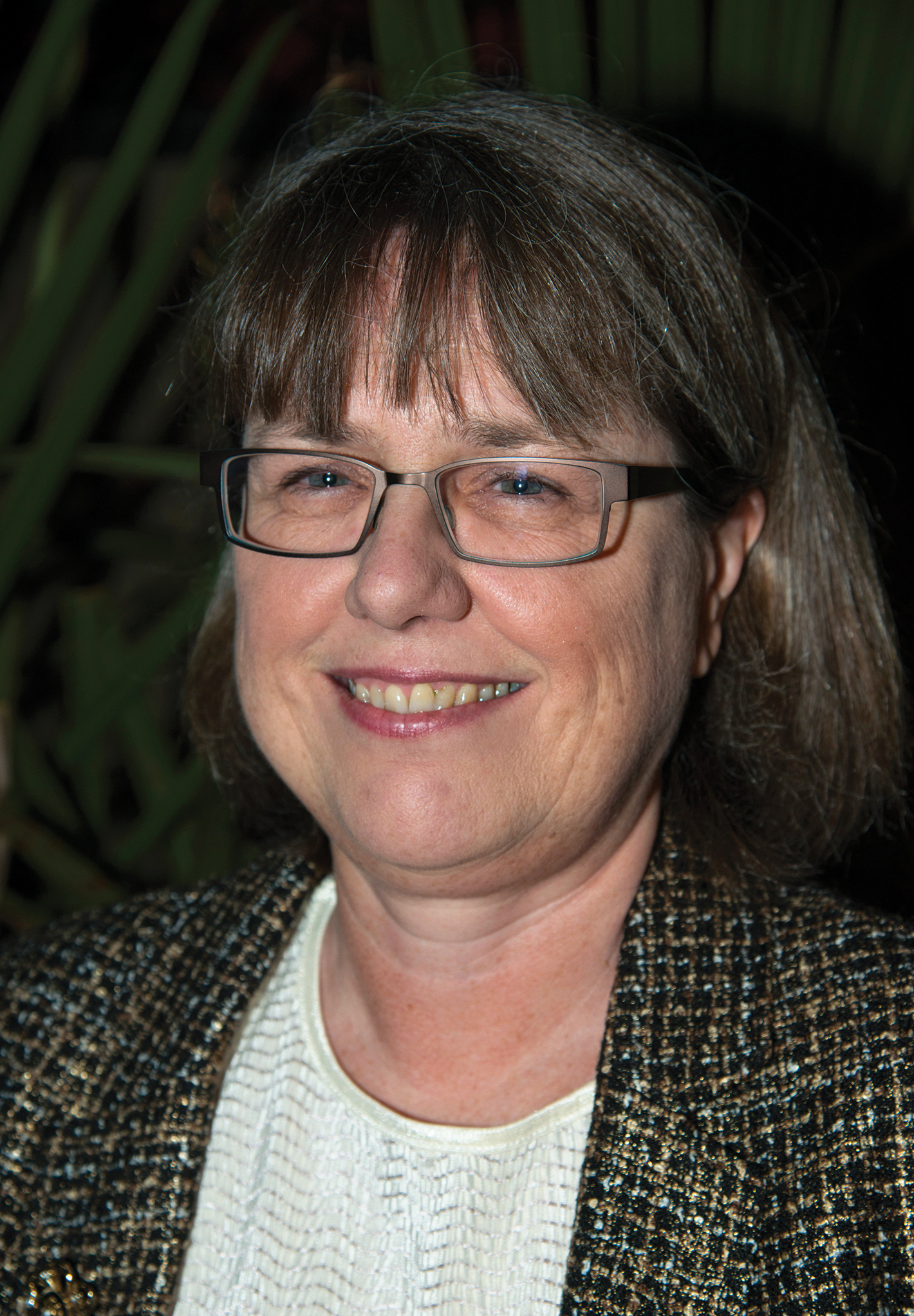
Canadian physicist Donna Strickland

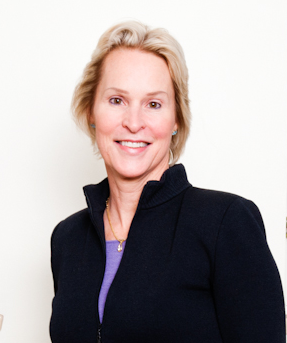
American chemical engineer Frances Arnold

=== 2000s ===
- 2000: Venezuelan astrophysicist Kathy Vivas presented her discovery of approximately 100 "new and very distant" RR Lyrae stars, providing insight into the structure and history of the Milky Way galaxy.
- 2000: Russian gynaecologist Galina Savelyeva founded the Department of Obstetrics and Gynaecology at Moscow State University. Savelyeva was one of the first scientists in the world to demonstrate the feasibility of using craniocerebral hypothermia in the treatment of babies born with asphyxia, which formed the basis for the Russian Ministry of Health's order on the primary resuscitation of babies born with asphyxia.
- 2001: Danish physicist Lene Hau led a Harvard University team who used a Bose–Einstein condensate to slow down a beam of light to about 17 metres per second, then were able to stop a beam completely.
- 2003: Danish structural chemist and crystallographer Sine Larsen became the first female scientific research director at the European Synchrotron Radiation Facility (ESRF), where she was responsible for research in the fields of structural biology and structural chemistry.
- 2003: American geophysicist Claudia Alexander oversaw the final stages of Project Galileo, a space exploration mission that ended at the planet Jupiter.
- 2004: American biologist Linda B. Buck received the Nobel Prize in Physiology or Medicine along with Richard Axel "for their discoveries of odorant receptors and the organization of the olfactory system".
- 2004: American astrophysicist and radio astronomer Naomi McClure-Griffiths identified a new spiral arm of the Milky Way galaxy.
- 2006: Chilean biochemist Cecilia Hidalgo Tapia became the first woman to receive the Chilean National Prize for Natural Sciences.
- 2006: Chinese-American biochemist Yizhi Jane Tao led a team of researchers to become the first to map the atomic structure of Influenza A, contributing to antiviral research.
- 2006: Parasitologist Susan Lim became the first Malaysian scientist elected to the International Commission on Zoological Nomenclature.
- 2006: Merieme Chadid became the first Moroccan person and the first female astronomer to travel to Antarctica, leading an international team of scientists in the installation of a major observatory in the South Pole.
- 2006: American computer scientist Frances E. Allen won the Turing Award for "pioneering contributions to the theory and practice of optimizing compiler techniques that laid the foundation for modern optimizing compilers and automatic parallel execution". She was the first woman to win the award.
- 2006: Israeli crystallographer Ada E. Yonath became the first woman awarded the Wolf Prize in Chemistry for "ingenious structural discoveries of the ribosomal machinery of peptide-bond formation and the light-driven primary processes in photosynthesis."
- 2006: Canadian-American computer scientist Maria Klawe became the president of Harvey Mudd College.
- 2007: Using satellite imagery, Egyptian geomorphologist Eman Ghoneim discovered traces of an 11,000-year-old mega lake in the Sahara Desert. The discovery shed light on the origins of the largest modern groundwater reservoir in the world.
- 2007: Physicist Ibtesam Badhrees was the first Saudi Arabian woman to become a member of the European Organization for Nuclear Research (CERN).
- 2008: French virologist Françoise Barré-Sinoussi received the Nobel Prize in Physiology or Medicine, shared with Harald zur Hausen and Luc Montagnier, "for their discovery of HIV, human immunodeficiency virus".
- 2008: American-born Australian Penny Sackett became Australia's first female chief scientist.
- 2008: American computer scientist Barbara Liskov won the Turing Award for "contributions to practical and theoretical foundations of programming language and system design, especially related to data abstraction, fault tolerance, and distributed computing".
- 2009: American molecular biologist Carol W. Greider received the Nobel Prize in Physiology or Medicine along with Elizabeth H. Blackburn and Jack W. Szostak "for the discovery of how chromosomes are protected by telomeres and the enzyme telomerase".
- 2009: After 20 years working on the project, British microscopist Pratibha Gai created the in-situ atomic-resolution environmental transmission electron microscope (ETEM) which allows for visualisation of chemical reactions at the atomic scale.
- 2009: Israeli crystallographer Ada E. Yonath, along with Venkatraman Ramakrishnan and Thomas A. Steitz, received the Nobel Prize in Chemistry "for studies of the structure and function of the ribosome".
- 2009: Chinese geneticist Zeng Fanyi and her research team published their experiment results proving that induced pluripotent stem cells can be used to generate whole mammalian bodies – in this case, live mice.

=== 2010s ===
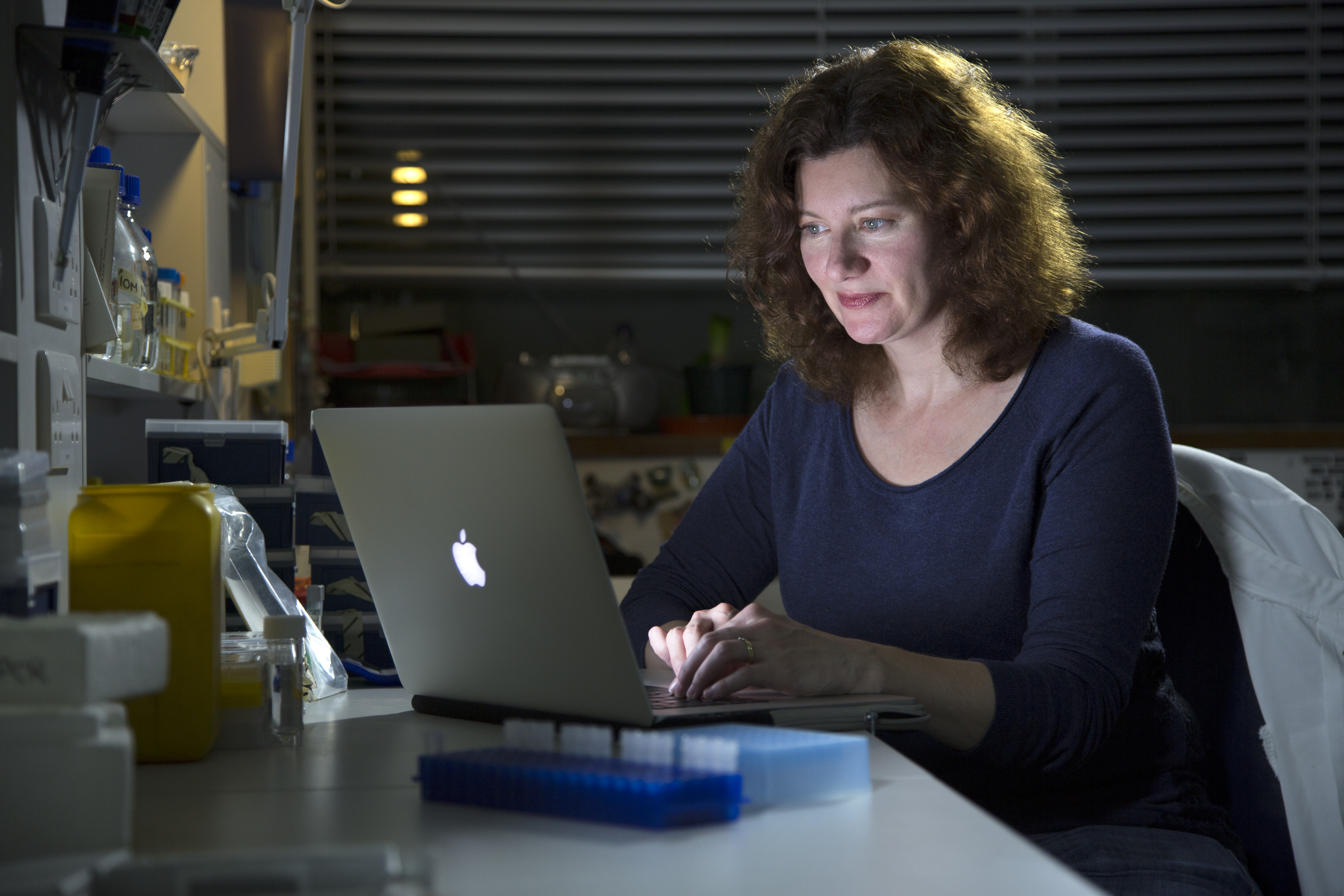
Canadian-British geneticist Turi King

- 2010: Marcia McNutt became the first female director of the United States Geological Survey.
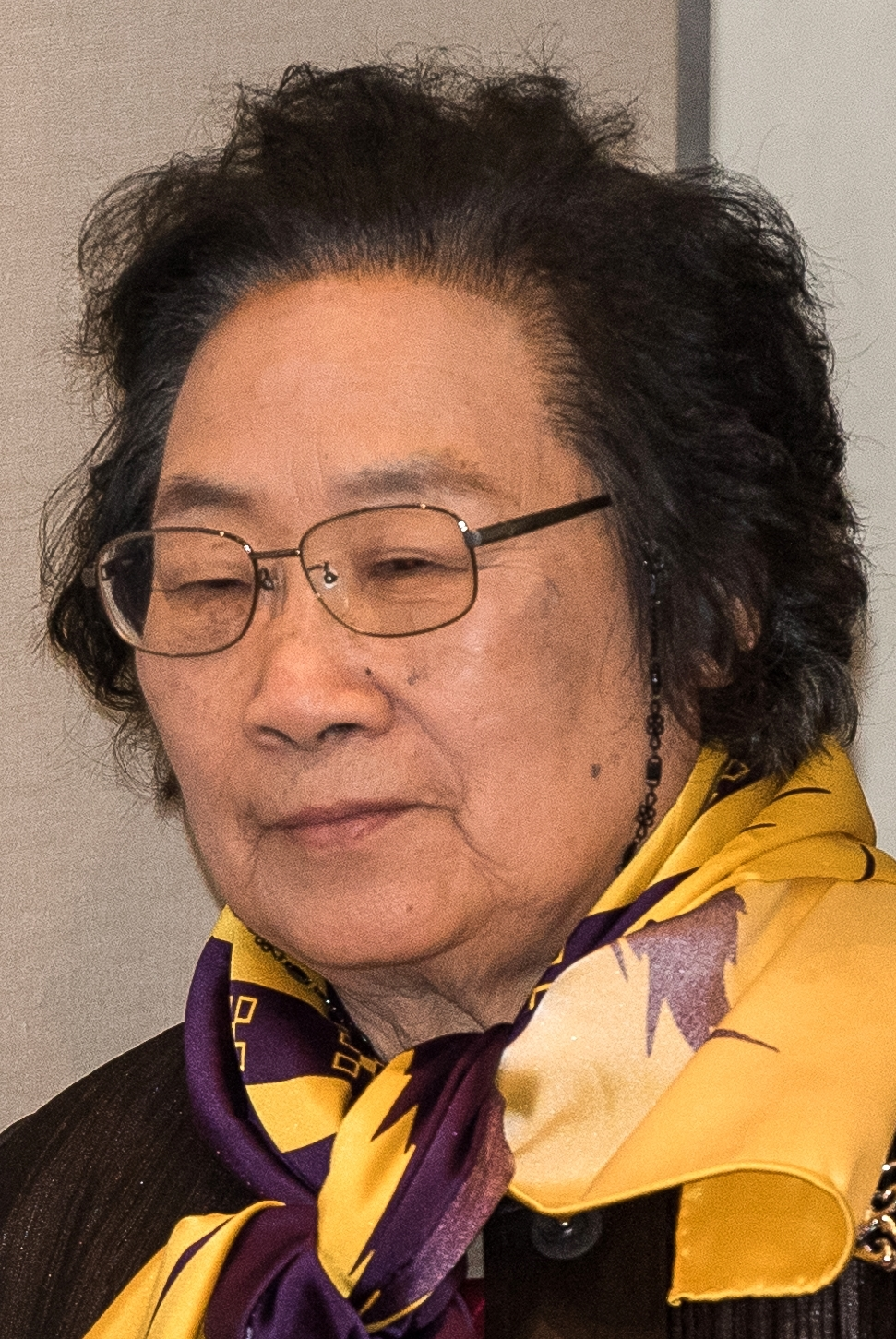
- Chinese pharmaceutical chemist Tu Youyou
  2011: Kazakhstani neuroscience student and computer hacker Alexandra Elbakyan launched Sci-Hub, a website that provides users with pirated copies of scholarly scientific papers. Within five years, Sci-Hub grew to contain 60 million papers and recorded over 42 million annual downloads by users. Elbakyan was finally sued by major academic publishing company Elsevier, and Sci-Hub was subsequently taken down, but it reappeared under different domain names.
- 2011: Taiwanese-American astrophysicist Chung-Pei Ma led a team of scientists in discovering two of the largest black holes ever observed.
- 2012: Israeli-American computer scientist and cryptographer Shafi Goldwasser won the Turing award for her contributions to cryptography and complexity theory.
- 2013: Canadian-British genetic specialist Turi King identified the 500-year-old skeletal remains of King Richard III.
- 2013: Kenyan ichthyologist Dorothy Wanja Nyingi published the first guide to freshwater fish species of Kenya.
- 2013: Canadian teenagers Miranda Wang and Jeanny Yao jointly identify a bacteria in British Columbia's Fraser River that breaks down phthalates.
- 2014: Norwegian psychologist and neuroscientist May-Britt Moser received the Nobel Prize in Physiology or Medicine, shared with Edvard Moser and John O'Keefe, "for their discoveries of cells that constitute a positioning system in the brain".
- 2014: American paleoclimatologist and marine geologist Maureen Raymo became the first woman to be awarded the Wollaston Medal, the highest award of the Geological Society of London.
- 2014: American theoretical physicist Shirley Ann Jackson was awarded the National Medal of Science. Jackson had been the first African-American woman to receive a PhD from the Massachusetts Institute of Technology (MIT) during the early 1970s, and the first woman to chair the U.S. Nuclear Regulatory Commission.
- 2014: Australian paediatric neurologist Ingrid Scheffer is elected a Fellow of the Australian Academy of Science. She is credited with finding the first gene implicated in epilepsy.
- 2014: Iranian mathematician Maryam Mirzakhani became the first woman to receive the Fields Medal, for her work in "the dynamics and geometry of Riemann surfaces and their moduli spaces".
- 2015: The International Day of Women and Girls in Science is an annual observance adopted by the United Nations General Assembly to promote the full and equal access and participation of women in Science, Technology, Engineering and Mathematics (STEM) fields; the United Nations General Assembly passed resolution 70/212 on 22 December 2015, which proclaimed the 11th day of February as the annual commemoration of the observance. The resolution had been presented by Iraqi geneticist and activist Nisreen El-Hashemite.
- 2015: Chinese medical scientist Tu Youyou received the Nobel Prize in Physiology or Medicine, shared with William C. Campbell and Satoshi Ōmura; she received it "for her discoveries concerning a novel therapy against Malaria".
- 2015: American inventor and clean water advocate Deepika Kurup invented a photocatalytic composite material that removes 100% of faecal coliform bacteria from contaminated water. Deepika won the Discovery Education 3M Young Scientist Challenge award and The US Stockholm Junior Water Prize for her work.
- 2015: Asha de Vos became the first Sri Lankan person to receive a PhD in marine mammal research, completing her thesis on "Factors influencing blue whale aggregations off southern Sri Lanka" at the University of Western Australia.
- 2016: American geophysicist Marcia McNutt became the first female president of the American National Academy of Sciences.
- 2016: French-Algerian particle physicist Yasmine Amhis was awarded the Jacques Herbrand Prize given by the French Academy of Sciences
- 2018: British astrophysicists Hiranya Peiris and Joanna Dunkley and Italian cosmologist Licia Verde were among 27 scientists awarded the Breakthrough Prize in Fundamental Physics for their contributions to "detailed maps of the early universe that greatly improved our knowledge of the evolution of the cosmos and the fluctuations that seeded the formation of galaxies".
- 2018: British astrophysicist Jocelyn Bell Burnell received the special Breakthrough Prize in Fundamental Physics for her scientific achievements and "inspiring leadership", worth $3 million. She donated the entirety of the prize money towards the creation of scholarships to assist women, underrepresented minorities and refugees who are pursuing the study of physics.
- 2018: Canadian physicist Donna Strickland received the Nobel Prize in Physics "for groundbreaking inventions in the field of laser physics"; she shared it with Arthur Ashkin and Gérard Mourou.
- 2018: New Zealand chemist Juliet Gerrard was appointed as the Prime Minister's Chief Science Advisor in the administration of Jacinda Ardern, the first time a woman was appointed to the role.
- 2018: American chemist Frances Arnold received the Nobel Prize in Chemistry "for the directed evolution of enzymes"; she shared it with George Smith and Gregory Winter, who received it "for the phage display of peptides and antibodies". This made Frances the first American woman to receive the Nobel Prize in Chemistry.
- 2018: For the first time in history, women received the Nobel Prize in Chemistry and the Nobel Prize in Physics in the same year.
- 2019: NASA astronauts Christina Koch and Jessica Meir complete the first ever all-female spacewalk outside the International Space Station (ISS) replacing a failed power control unit.
- 2019: American Mathematician Karen Uhlenbeck became the first woman to win the Abel Prize for "her pioneering achievements in geometric partial differential equations, gauge theory, and integrable systems, and for the fundamental impact of her work on analysis, geometry and mathematical physics".
- 2019: New Zealand chemist Margaret Brimble is the first New Zealand woman to be inducted into the Division of Medicinal Chemistry of the American Chemical Society’s Hall of Fame.
- 2019: Malawian nurse and educator Address Malata is appointed as Vice-Chancellor of the Malawi University of Science and Technology (MUST), becoming the first Malawian women university Vice-Chancellor.
- 2019: American imaging scientist Katie Bouman developed an algorithm that made the first visualization of a black hole possible using the Event Horizon Telescope. She was part of the team of over 200 people who implemented the project.

=== 2020s ===
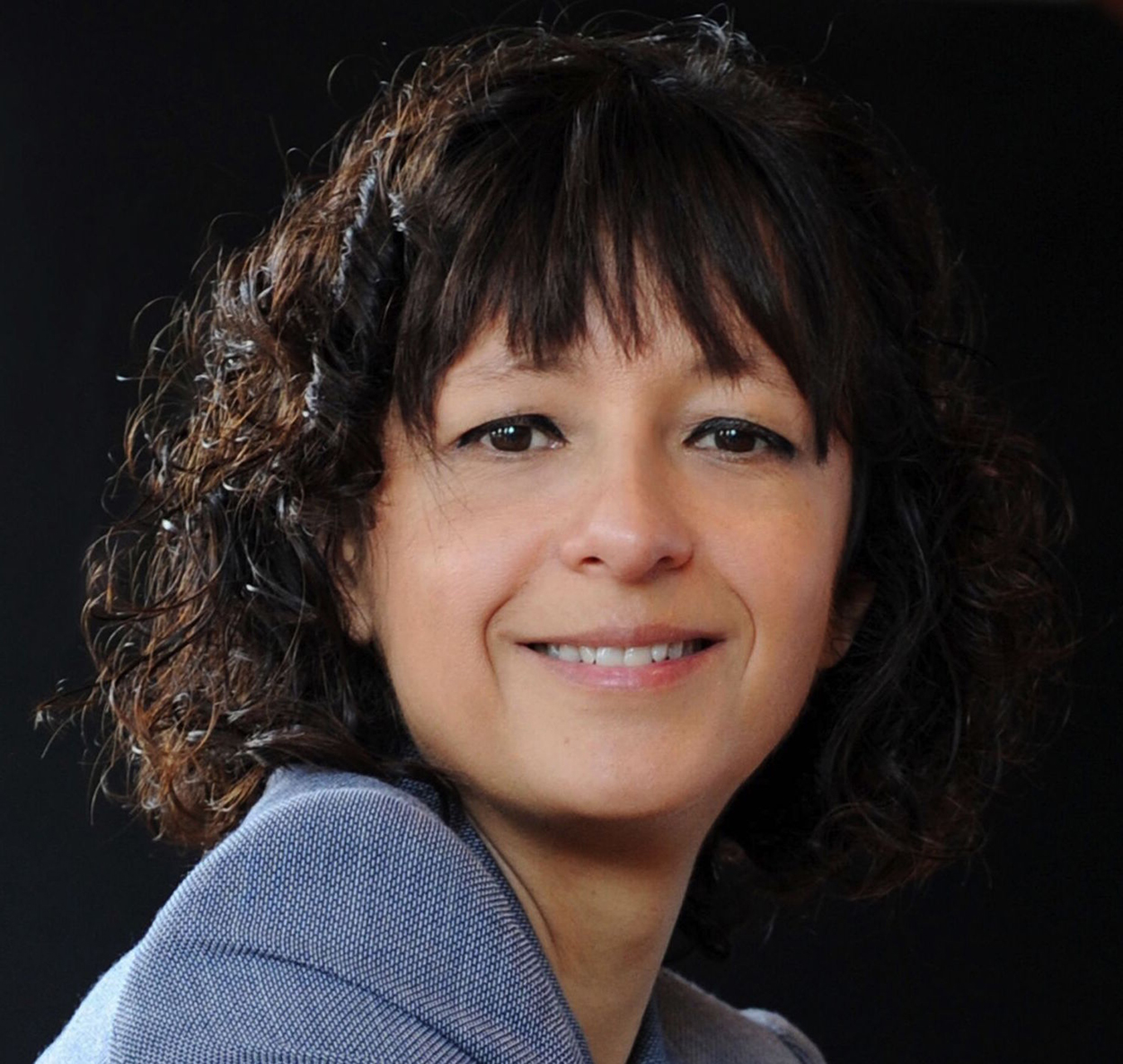
- French microbiologist Emmanuelle Charpentier
  2020: The Nigerian Academy of Science elected epidemiologist/parasitologist Ekanem Braide as its first female president.
- 2020: Brazilian Scientist and Researcher Jaqueline Goes de Jesus, sequenced COVID-19 genome in 12 hours.
- 2020: Biochemists Jennifer Doudna (American) and Emmanuelle Charpentier (French) received the Nobel Prize in Chemistry for their work on CRISPR genome editing tool.
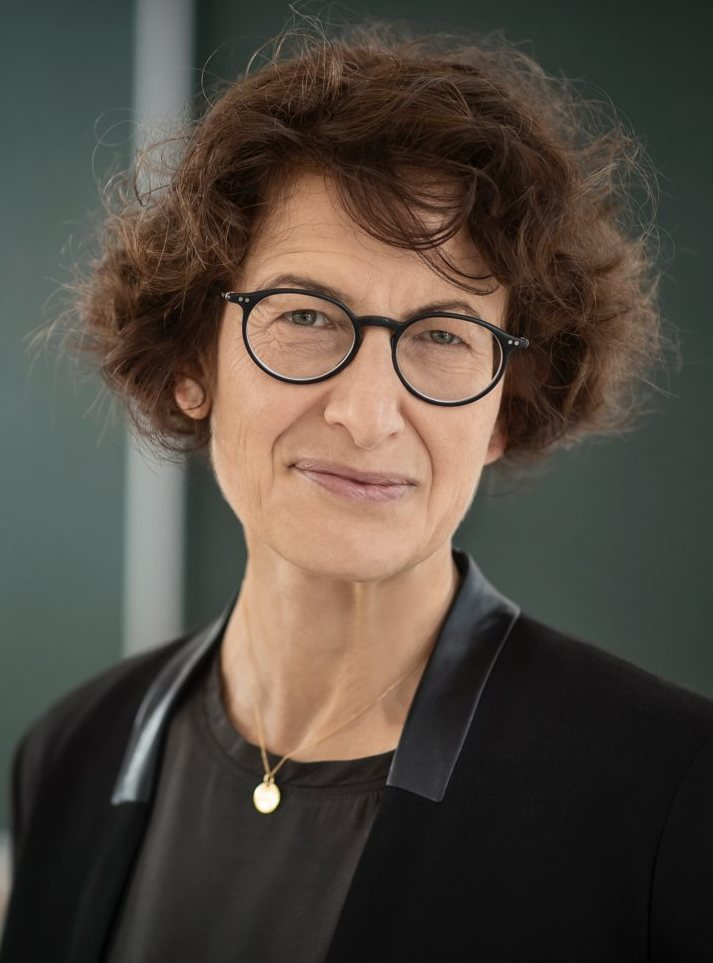
  German-Turkish scientist Özlem Türeci
- 2020: American astronomer Andrea M. Ghez received the Nobel Prize in Physics for the discovery of a supermassive compact object.
- 2020: German-Turkish scientist Özlem Türeci is the co-founder and chief medical officer of BioNTech. Her team developed BNT162b2 (tozinameran (INN)), commonly known as the Pfizer–BioNTech COVID-19 vaccine.
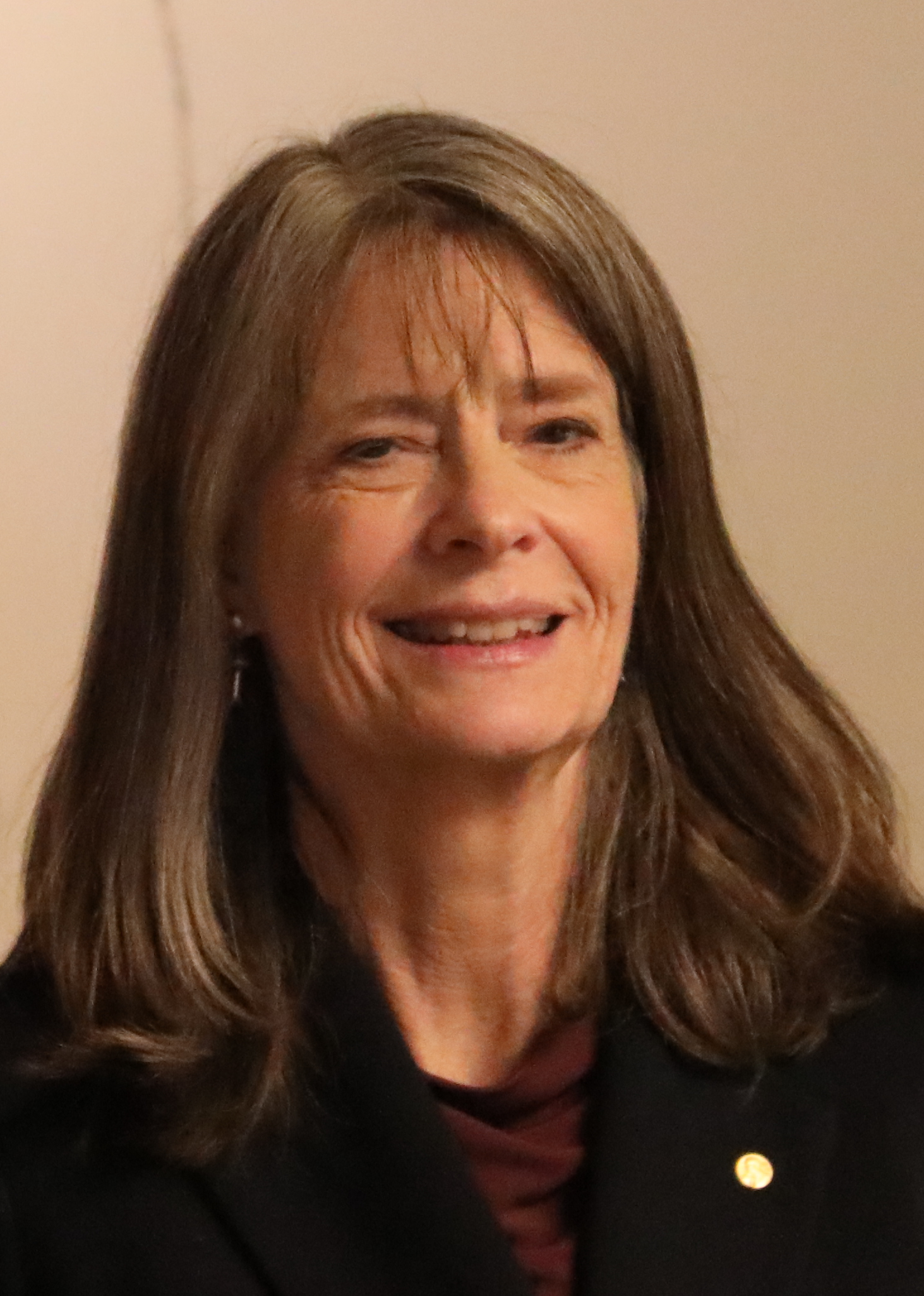
- American molecular biologist and immunologist Mary E. Brunkow
  2020: British vaccinologist Sarah Gilbert leads the development and testing of a vaccine which becomes the Oxford–AstraZeneca COVID-19 vaccine.
- 2021: Catherine Heymans was appointed as the first female Astronomer Royal for Scotland.
- 2022: American chemist Carolyn R. Bertozzi received the Nobel Prize in Chemistry for her development of Bioorthogonal chemistry.
- 2023: Australian geomicrobiologist Jillian Banfield became the first female recipient of the van Leeuwenhoek Medal, which she received for her studies of complex microbial communities and their interaction with the environment.
- 2023: Hungarian American scientist Katalin Kariko receives Noble prize in Physiology or Medicine with Drew Weissman for their discoveries on nucleoside base modifications that enabled the development of effective mRNA vaccines. https://www.nobelprize.org/prizes/medicine/2023/press-release/
- 2025: South African-born physicist and space scientist Michele Dougherty is appointed Astronomer Royal for the United Kingdom, becoming the first woman appointed to the role in its 350-year history.
- 2025: American biologist Mary E. Brunkow receives the Nobel Prize in Physiology or Medicine for her studies of the FOXP3 gene, which was significant to future studies of peripheral immune tolerance. She shared this award with immunologists Fred Ramsdell and Shimon Sakaguchi.
- 2026: Kazakhstan launches its first all female Space Isolation Experiment, SANA-1, at the National Space Center.

== See also ==
- List of female scientists before the 20th century
- Lists of women in science
- Timeline of women in geology
- Timeline of women's education
- Timeline of women in computing
- Timeline of women in library science
- Timeline of women in mathematics in the United States
- Timeline of women in mathematics
- Timeline of women in science in the United States
- Women in physics
