= List of women scientists before the 20th century =

This is a historical list, intended to deal with the time period where it is believed that women working in science were rare. For this reason, this list ends with the 20th century.

== Antiquity ==
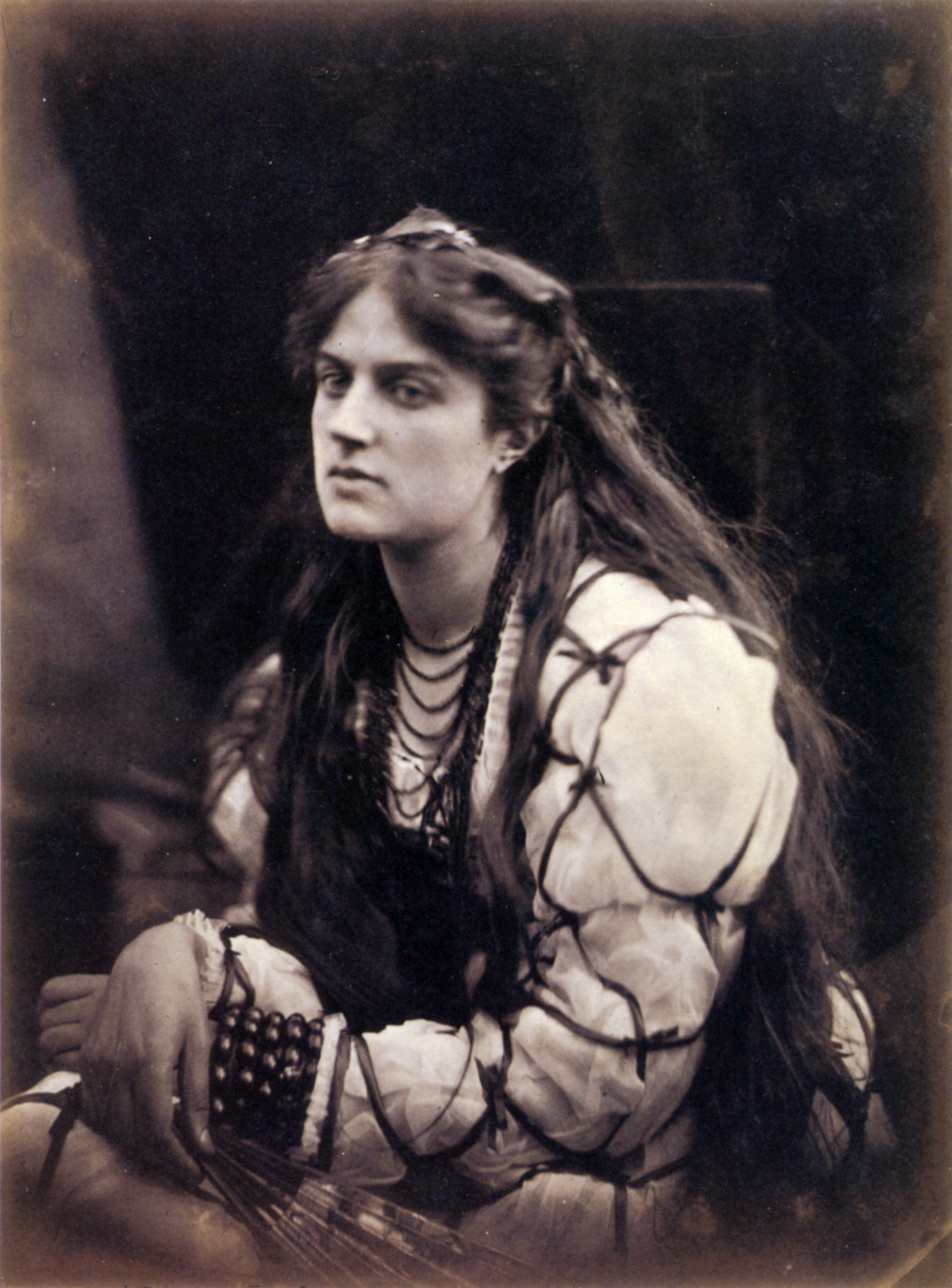
Marie Spartali as Hypatia by Julia Margaret Cameron

- Aemilia (c. 300 CE–363 CE), Gallo-Roman physician
- Aglaonike (2nd century BCE), woman astronomer in Ancient Greece
- Agnodike (4th century BCE), first woman physician to practice legally in Athens
- Andromache (mid-6th century), Egyptian physician
- Arete of Cyrene (5th–4th centuries BCE), Greek natural and moral philosopher
- Artemisia of Caria (c. 300 BCE), botanist
- Aspasia the Physician (fl. 1st century CE), Greek physician
- Aurelia Alexandria Zosime, Ancient Roman physician
- Chun Yuyan (1st century BCE), Chinese obstetrician and gynecologist
- Cleopatra the Alchemist (c. 3rd century CE), wrote the alchemical book, Chrysopoeia, or "gold-making"
- Damo (6th century BCE), Greek natural philosopher
- Diotima of Mantinea (4th century BCE), philosopher and scientist, ancient Greece
- Echecratia the Philiasian (5th century BCE), Greek/Italian mathematician and natural philosopher
- Elephantis (1st century BCE), Greek physician
- Enheduanna (c. 2285–2250 BCE), Sumerian/Akkadian astronomer and poet
- Fabiola (died 399 CE), Roman physician
- Fang (first century BCE), Chinese chemist
- Favilla (2nd century), Roman physician
- Gargi Vachaknavi (7th century BCE), Indian philosopher
- Gu Bao (4th century), Chinese physician
- Hypatia (370–415 CE), mathematician and astronomer, Egypt
- Laïs (c. 1st/2nd century BCE), midwife
- Leoparda (4th century CE), gynecologist
- Macrina (4th century CE), Greek physician and nun
- Marcella (4th century CE), Roman healer
- Mary the Jewess (1st or 2nd century CE), alchemist
- Melissa (3rd century BCE), Greek philosopher
- Metrodora (c. 200–400 CE), Greek physician and author
- Minucia Asste, Ancient Roman physician
- Myia (5th century BCE), Greek philosopher
- Nicerata (c. 5th century), physician and healer
- Olympias of Thebes (1st century BCE), Greek midwife
- Origenia (2nd century CE), Greek healer
- Pao Ku Ko (3rd century CE), Chinese chemist
- Paphnutia the Virgin (c. 300), Egyptian alchemist
- Paula of Rome (347–404 CE), Roman healer
- Perictione (5th century BCE), Greek philosopher, mother of Plato
- Panthea, Ancient Greek physician, wife and colleague of Glycon
- Philinna of Thessaly, Ancient Greek physician
- Peseshet, Egyptian physician (Fourth Dynasty)
- Pythias of Assos (4th century BCE), marine zoologist
- Restituta (1st century), Ancient Roman physician
- Salpe (1st century BCE), Greek midwife
- Sotira (1st century BCE), Greek physician
- Tapputi-Belatekallim (First mentioned in a clay tablet dating to 2000 BCE), Babylonian perfumer, the first person in history recorded as using a chemical process
- Terentia Prima, Ancient Roman physician
- Theano (6th century BCE), philosopher, mathematician and physician
- Thelka, Iranian
- Theosebeia, correspondent of the alchemist Zosimus of Panopolis
- Yi Jia (2nd century BCE), Chinese physician

== Middle Ages ==
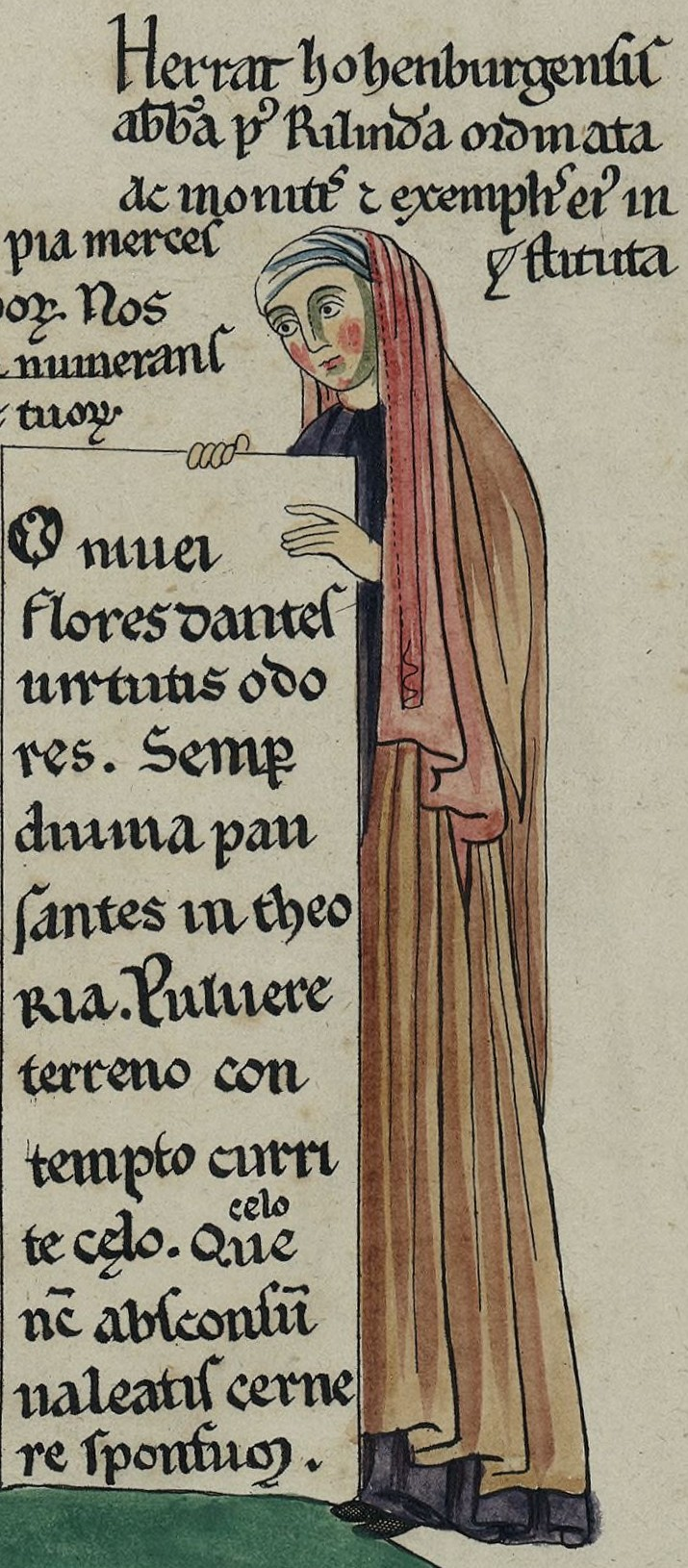
Herrad of Landsbert

- Abella (14th century), Italian physician
- Adelle of the Saracens (12th century), Italian physician
- Adelmota of Carrara (14th century), Italian physician
- Rufaida Al-Aslamia (7th century), Muslim nurse
- Maesta Antonia (1386–1408), Florentine physician
- Ameline la Miresse (fl. 1313–1325), French physician
- Jeanne d'Ausshure (d. 1366), French surgeon
- Brunetta de Siena (fl. 15th century), Italian-Jewish physician
- Hildegard of Bingen (1099–1179), German natural philosopher
- Sibyl of Benevento, Napolitan physician specializing in the plague buboes
- Gentile Budrioli (?–1498), Italian astrologer and herbalist
- Constanza, Italian surgeon.
- Denice (fl. 1292), French barber-surgeon
- Demud (fl. ca. 13th century), German physician
- Dobrodeia of Kiev (fl. 1122), Byzantine physician
- Dorotea Bucca (fl. 1390), Italian professor of medicine
- Constance Calenda (15th century), Italian surgeon specializing in diseases of the eye
- Virdimura of Catania (fl. 1376), Jewish-Sicilian physician
- Caterina of Florence (fl. 1400s), Florentine physician
- Jeanne de Cusey (fl. 1438), French barber-surgeon
- Antonia Daniello (fl. 1400), Florentine-Jewish physician
- Clarice di Durisio (15th century), Italian physician
- Fava of Manosque (fl. 1322), French-Jewish physician
- Jacobina Félicie (fl. 1322), Italian physician
- Francesca, muller de Berenguer Satorra (15th century), Catalan physician
- Katherine Briçonnet (c. 1494–1526) French architect
- Maria Gallicia (fl. 1309), licensed surgeon
- Bellayne Gallipapa (fl. 1380), Zaragoza, Spanish-Jewish physician
- Dolcich Gallipapa (fl. 1384), Leyda, Spanish-Jewish physician
- Na Pla Gallipapa (fl. 1387), Zaragoza, Spanish-Jewish physician
- Sarah de St Giles (fl. 1326), French-Jewish physician and medical teacher
- Rebecca de Guarna (fl. 1200), Italian physician
- Magistra Hersend (fl. 1249–1259), French surgeon
- Maria Incarnata, Italian surgeon, mentioned in Pope Sixtus IV edict regarding physicians and surgeons.
- Isabiau la Mergesse (fl. 1292), French-Jewish physician
- Floreta La-Noga (fl. 1374), Aragonese physician
- Helvidis (fl. 1176), French physician
- Keng Hsien-Seng (10th century), Chinese chemist
- Li Shao Yun (11th century), Chinese chemist
- Stephanie de Lyon (fl. 1265), French physician
- Guillemette du Luys (fl. 1479), French royal surgeon
- Thomasia de Mattio, Italian physician, mentioned in Pope Sixtus IV edict regarding physicians and surgeons.
- Margherita di Napoli (late 14th century), Napolitan oculist active in Frankfurt-am-Main
- Mercuriade (14th century), Italian physician and surgeon
- Gilette de Narbonne (fl. 1300), French physician. Giovanni Boccaccio wrote of her in ‘’The Decameron’’, calling her ‘Donna Medica’; Alfred Duru and Henri Chivot wrote a comic opera about her called Gillette de Narbonne.
- Isabella da Ocre, Napolitan surgeon
- Francisca da Romana, Napolitan physician
- Dame Péronelle (1292–1319), French herbalist
- Peretta Peronne, also called Perretta Petone (fl. 1411), French surgeon
- Lauretta Ponte da Saracena Calabria, Napolitan physician
- Trota of Salerno (fl. 1090), Italian physician
- Marguerite Saluzzi (fl. 1460), Napolitan licensed herbalist physician
- Sara de Sancto Aegidio (fl. 1326), French physician
- Juana Sarrovia (fl. 1384), Barcelona, Spanish physician
- Shen Yu Hsiu (15th century), Chinese chemist
- Sun Pu-Eh (12th century), Chinese chemist
- Raymunda da Taberna, licensed Napolitan surgeon
- Théophanie (fl. 1291), French barber surgeon
- Trotta da Toya (f. 1307), Napolitan physician
- Polisena da Troya (fl. 1335), licensed Napolitan surgeon
- Margarita da Venosa (fl. 1333), licensed Napolitan surgeon, who studied at the University of Salerno She was considered a noteworthy practitioner and counted Ladislaus, king of Naples, as a patient.
- Francisca di Vestis (fl. 1308), Napolian physician
- Zhang Xiaoniang (11th century), Chinese physician

== 16th century ==
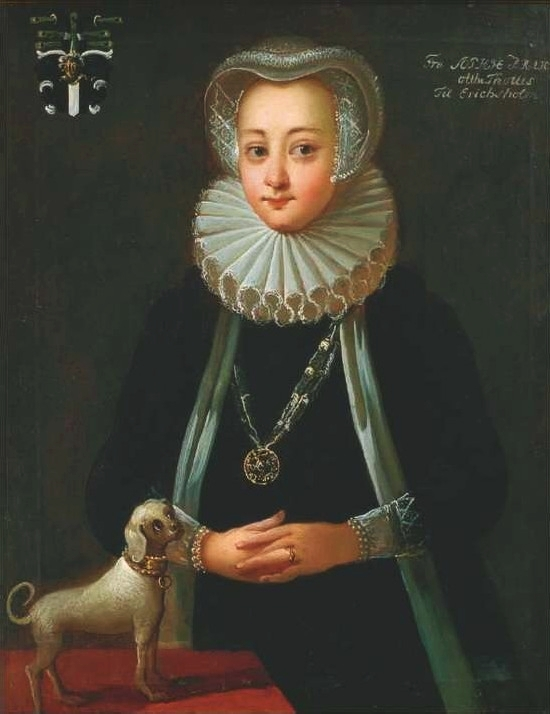
Sophie Brahe portrait

- Maria Andreae (1550–1632), German pharmacist
- Marie de Brimeu (1550–1605), Flemish botanist
- Sophia Brahe (1556–1643), Danish astronomer and chemist
- Plautilla Bricci (1616–1690) Italian architect
- Isabella Cortese (fl. 1561), Italian alchemist
- Anna Hebrea (fl. 1508), Italian cosmetologist-chemist
- Helena Magenbuch (1523–1597), German pharmacist
- Loredana Marcello (died 1572), Venetian botanist
- Elizabeth Moulthorne (fl. 1593), English barber-surgeon
- Tarquinia Molza (1542–1617), Italian natural philosopher
- Catherine de Parthenay (1554–1631), French mathematician
- Elinor Sneshell (fl. 1593), English surgeon
- Agatha Streicher (1520–1581), German physician
- Caterina Vitale (1566–1619), Maltese pharmacist and chemist
- Tan Yunxian (1461–1554), Chinese physician

== 17th century ==
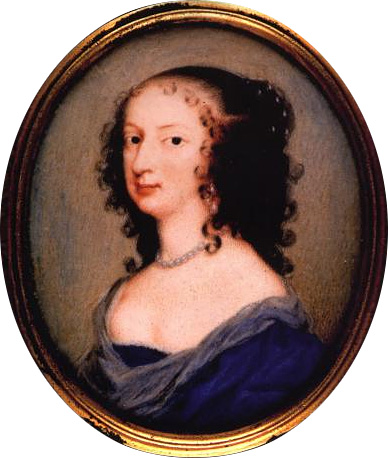
Margaret Cavendish

- Anna Åkerhjelm (1647–1693), Swedish traveler and archaeologist
- Ann Baynard (1672–1697), British Natural philosopher
- Aphra Behn (1640–1689), British translator of an astronomical work
- Martine Bertereau (1600–fl.1642), French mineralogist
- Agnes Block (1629–1704), Dutch horticulturalist
- Elisabeth of Bohemia, Princess Palatine (1618–1680), German natural philosopher
- Louise Bourgeois Boursier (1563–1636), French obstetrician
- Titia Brongersma (1650–1700), Frisian archaeologist, poet
- Margaret Cavendish (1623–1673), natural philosopher
- Marie Crous (fl. 1640), French mathematician
- Maria Cunitz (1610–1664), Silesian astronomer
- Jeanne Dumée (1660–1706), French astronomer
- Maria Clara Eimmart (1676–1707), German astronomer
- Marie Fouquet (1590–1681), French medical writer
- Eleanor Glanville (1654–1709), English entomologist
- Elisabeth Hevelius (1647–1693), Polish astronomer
- Maria Sibylla Merian (1647–1717), naturalist
- Marie Meurdrac (c. 1610–1680), French chemist and alchemist
- Elena Cornaro Piscopia (1646–1684), Italian mathematician and the first female PhD
- Marguerite de la Sablière (c. 1640–1693), French natural philosopher
- Jane Sharp (fl. 1671), British obstetrician
- Justine Siegemund (1636–1705), German obstetrician
- Mary Somerset, Duchess of Beaufort (1630–1715), English botanist
- Elizabeth Walker (1623–1690), British pharmacist
- Lady Elizabeth Wilbraham (1632–1705) British architect

== 18th century ==
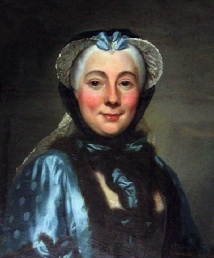
Geneviève Charlotte d'Arconville

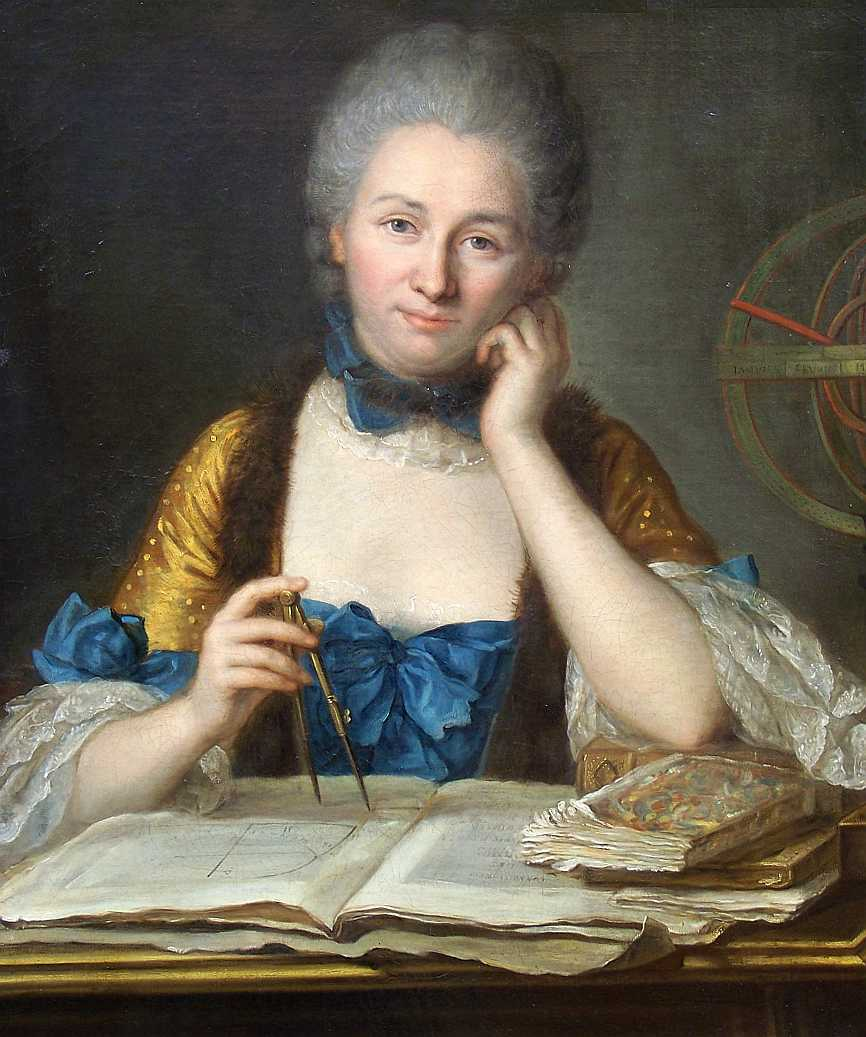
Portrait of Émilie du Châtelet by Maurice Quentin de La Tour

- Maria Gaetana Agnesi (1718–1799), Italian mathematician
- Geneviève Charlotte d'Arconville (1720–1805), French anatomist
- Madeleine-Françoise Calais (circa 1713– fl. 1740) French dentist
- Princess Charlotte of Saxe-Meiningen (1751–1827), German astronomer
- Maria Angela Ardinghelli (1728–1825), Italian mathematician and physicist
- Sarah Sophia Banks (1744–1818), British natural history collector
- Giuseppa Barbapiccola (c. 1702–1740), natural philosopher, translator
- Jeanne Baret (1740–1807), French circumnavigator and botanist
- Laura Bassi (1711–1778), Italian physicist
- Marie Marguerite Bihéron (1719–1795), French anatomist
- Celia Grillo Borromeo (1684–1777), Italian natural philosopher
- Jacoba van den Brande (1735–1794), Dutch founder of first all-female science academy
- Maria Christina Bruhn (1732–1808), Swedish inventor
- Margaret Bryan (c. 1760–1815), British natural philosopher
- Elsa Beata Bunge (1734–1819), Swedish botanist
- Lydia Byam (fl. 1797–1800), naturalist
- Madeleine-Françoise Calais (1713 or 1714–fl. 1740) was a French dentist
- María Andrea Casamayor (1700–1780), Spanish mathematician
- Émilie du Châtelet (1706–1749), French mathematician and physicist
- Maria Medina Coeli (1764–1846), Italian physician
- Jane Colden (1724–1766), American biologist
- Rosalie de Constant (1758–1834), Swiss naturalist
- Angélique du Coudray (1712–1794), French midwife
- Maria Dalle Donne (1778–1842), Italian physician
- Catharina Helena Dörrien (1717 – 1795), German botanist
- Eva Ekeblad (1724–1786), Swedish agronomist
- Hannah English Williams (died 1722), collector of natural history in the American British Colonies
- Dorothea Erxleben (1715–1762), German physician
- Charlotta Frölich (1698–1770), Swedish agronomist and historian
- Elizabeth Fulhame (fl. 1794), British chemist
- Lucia Galeazzi Galvani (1743–1788), Italian physician
- Sophie Germain (1776–1831), elasticity theory, number theory
- Clelia Durazzo Grimaldi (1760–1830), Italian botanist
- Catherine Littlefield Greene (1755–1814), American inventor
- Salomée Halpir (1718-fl. 1763), Lithuanian oculist
- Caroline Herschel (1750–1848), German-British astronomer
- Catherine Jérémie (1664–1744), French-Canadian botanist
- Christine Kirch (1696–1782), German astronomer
- Margaretha Kirch (1703–1744), German astronomer
- Maria Margarethe Kirch (1670–1720), German astronomer
- Marie Lachapelle (1769–1821), French midwife
- Marie-Jeanne de Lalande (1760–1832), French astronomer
- Marie Paulze Lavoisier (1758–1836), French chemist and illustrator
- Cornélie Lebon-de Brambilla (1767–1812), French engineer involved in gas lighting
- Nicole-Reine Lepaute (1723–1792), French astronomer
- Elisabeth Christina von Linné (1743–1782), Swedish botanist
- Martha Daniell Logan (1704–1779), American horticulturalist
- Eliza Lucas (1722–1793), American agronomist and indigo dye pioneer
- Maria Lullin (1750–1831), Swiss entomologist
- Catharine Macaulay (1731–1791), British social scientist
- Anna Morandi Manzolini (1716–1774), Italian physician and anatomist
- Marie Le Masson Le Golft (1750–1826), French naturalist
- Sybilla Masters (1675–1720), patent for a corn mill
- Lady Anne Monson (1726–1776), English botanist
- Elizabeth Carrington Morris (1795–1865), American botanist
- Maria Petraccini (1759–1791), Italian anatomist and physician
- Zaffira Peretti (fl. 1780), Italian anatomist and physician
- Claudine Picardet (1735–1820) French chemist, mineralogist and meteorologist
- Louise du Pierry (1746–1807), French astronomer
- Marie Anne Victoire Pigeon (1724–1767), French mathematician
- Faustina Pignatelli (1705–1785), Italian physicist
- Anna Barbara Reinhart (1730–1796), Swiss mathematician
- Cristina Roccati (1732–1797), Italian physics teacher
- Jane Squire (bap. 1686 – 1743), English mathematician
- Clotilde Tambroni (1758–1817), Italian philologist and linguistic
- Petronella Johanna de Timmerman (1723–1786), Dutch scientist
- Wang Zhenyi (1768–1797), Chinese astronomer

== 19th century ==
=== Anthropology ===
- Maria Czaplicka (1884–1921), Polish cultural anthropologist
- Alice Cunningham Fletcher (1838–1923), American ethnologist
- Johanna Mestorf (1828–1909), German prehistoric archaeologist
- Margaret Murray (1863–1963), British anthropologist
- Clémence Royer (1830–1902), French anthropologist
- Ellen Churchill Semple (1863–1932), American geographer
- Praskovja Uvarova (1840–1924), Russian archaeologist

=== Archaeology ===
- Cornelia Horsford (1861– c. 1941), American archaeologist
- Lady Hester Stanhope (1776–1839), British archaeologist
- Zsófia Torma (1832–1899), Hungarian archaeologist, paleologist, anthropologist

=== Astronomy ===
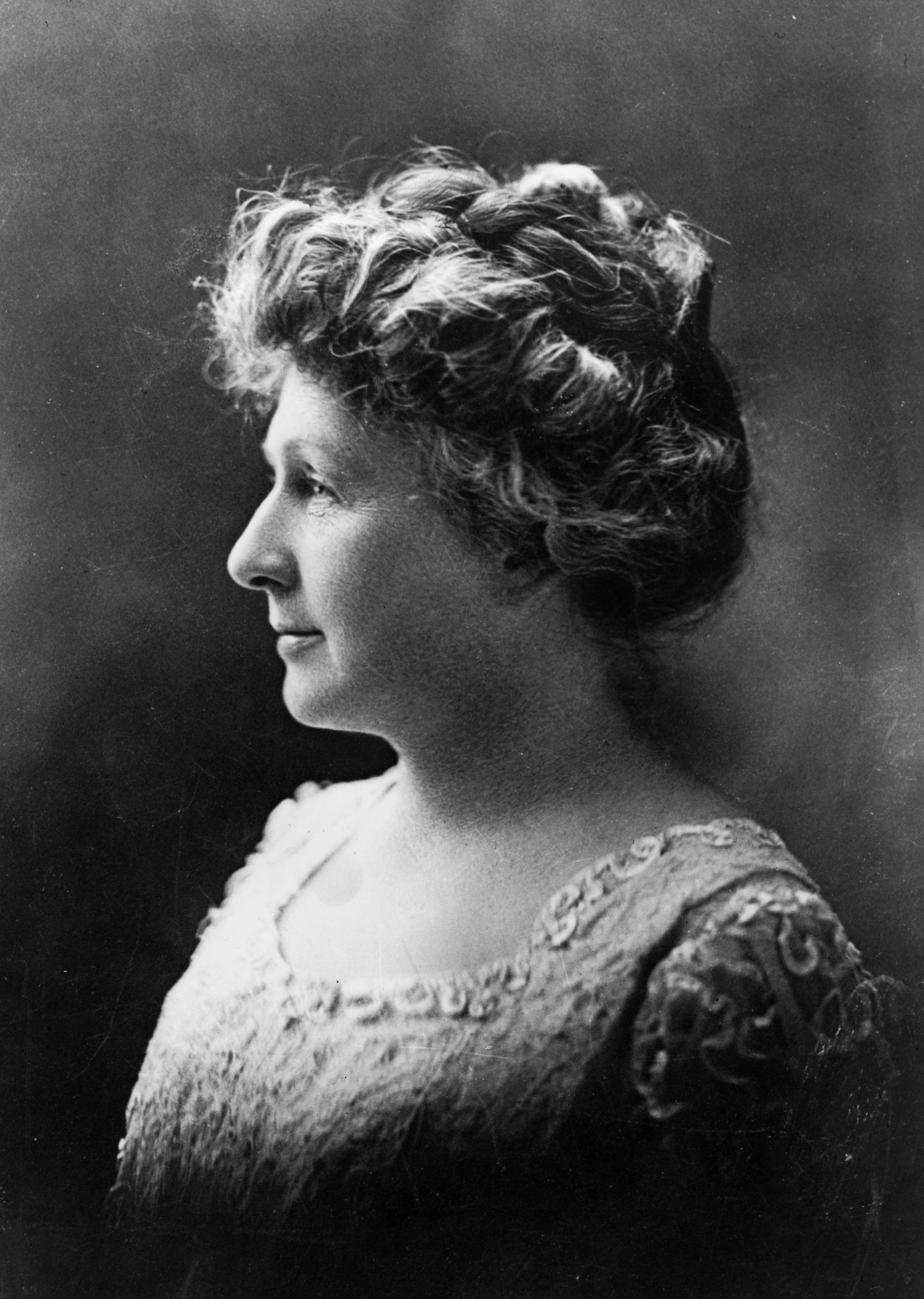
Annie Jump Cannon, 1922 Portrait

- Mary Albertson (1838–1914), American botanist and astronomer
- Annie Jump Cannon (1863–1941), American astronomer
- Agnes Mary Clerke (1842–1907), British astronomer
- Florence Cushman (1860–1940), American astronomer
- Williamina Fleming (1857–1911), Scottish/American astronomer
- Caroline Herschel (1750–1848), German astronomer active in England
- Margaret Lindsay Murray Huggins (1848–1915), British astronomer
- Henrietta Swan Leavitt (1868–1921), American astronomer
- Annie Russell Maunder (1868–1947), Irish astronomer
- Antonia Caetana Maury (1866–1952), American astronomer
- Maria Mitchell (1818–1889), American astronomer
- Isis Pogson (1852–1945), British astronomer
- Caterina Scarpellini (1808–1873), Italian astronomer
- Sarah Frances Whiting (1846–1927), American astronomer and physicist
- Mary Watson Whitney (1847–1921), American astronomer
- Anna Winlock (1857–1904), American astronomer

=== Biology or natural history ===
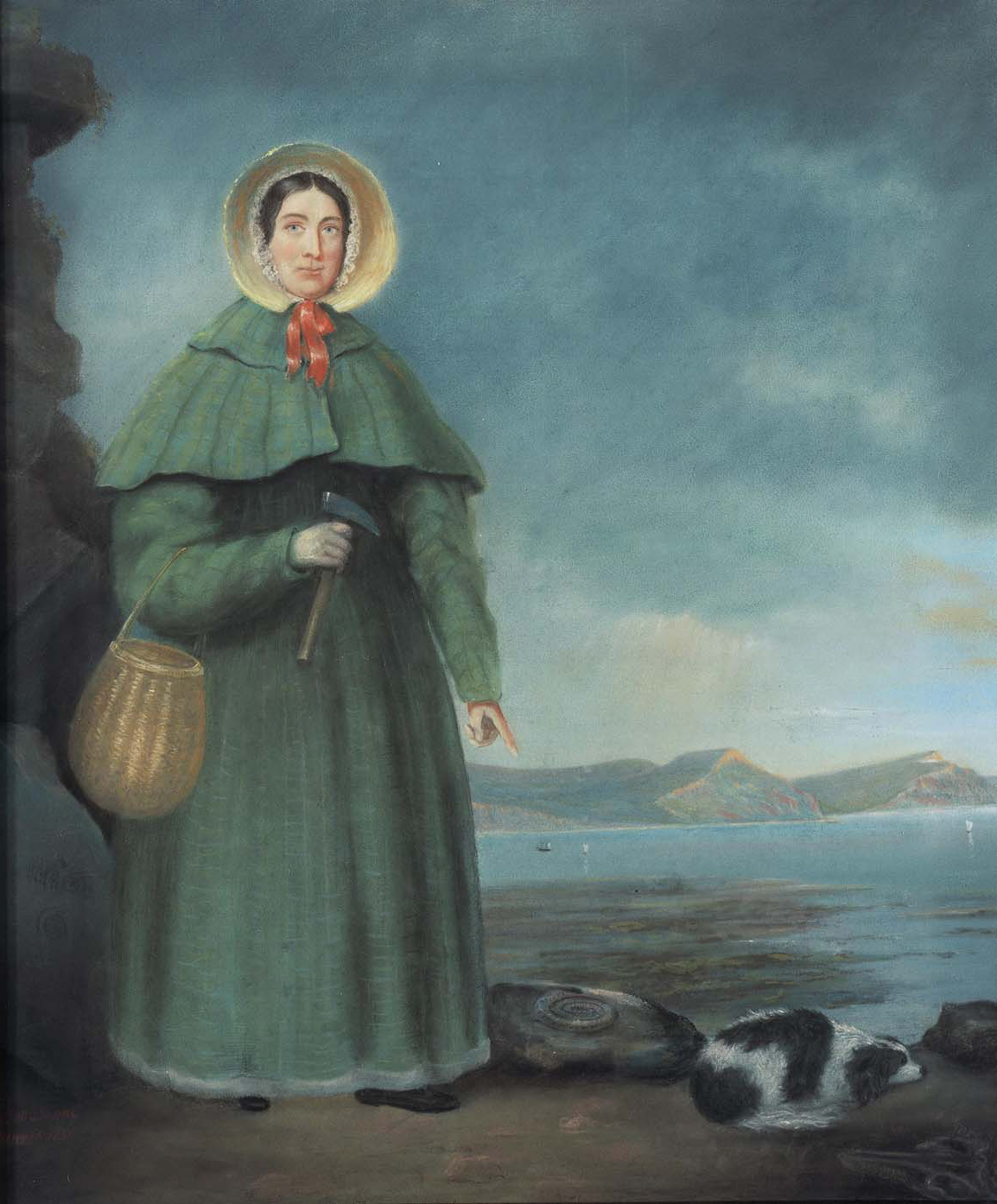
Mary Anning

- Frances Acton (1793–1881), British botanist
- Elizabeth Cary Agassiz (1822–1907), American natural historian
- Mary Albertson (1838–1914), American botanist and astronomer
- Mary Anning (1799–1847), British natural historian
- Emily Arnesen (1876–1928), Norwegian zoologist
- Anna Atkins (1799–1871), British botanist
- Harriet Henrietta Beaufort (1778–1865), British botanist
- Isabella Bird Bishop (1831–1904), British natural historian
- Priscilla Susan Bury (1799–1872), English botanist
- Albertina Carlsson (1848–1930), Swedish zoologist
- Mary Agnes Meara Chase (1869–1963), American biologist
- Cornelia Clapp (1849–1934), American zoologist
- Anna Botsford Comstock (1854–1930), American natural historian
- Clara Eaton Cummings (1855–1906), American botanist
- Eunice P. Cutter (1819–1898), American author of anatomy textbooks
- Lydia Maria Adams DeWitt (1859–1928), American pathologist
- Mary Cynthia Dickerson (1866–1923), American herpetologist, museum curator and writer
- Amalie Dietrich (1821–1891), German natural historian
- Alice Eastwood (1859–1953), American biologist
- Rosa Smith Eigenmann (1858–1947), American biologist
- Olga Fedtschenko (1845–1921), Russian botanist
- Maria Elizabeth Fernald (1839–1919), American entomologist
- Elisabetta Fiorini Mazzanti (1799–1879), Italian botanist
- Susanna Phelps Gage (1857–1915), American embryologist and comparative anatomist
- Lilian Jane Gould (1861–1936), British biologist
- Amelia Griffiths (1768–1858), British phycologist
- Marian E. Hubbard (1868–1956), American zoologist
- Agnes Ibbetson (1757–1823), English vegetable physiologist
- Susan Hallowell (1835–1911), American botanist
- Gabrielle Howard (1876–1930), British plant physiologist
- Ellen Hutchins (1785–1815), Irish botanist
- Ida Henrietta Hyde (1857–1945), American biologist
- Maria Elizabetha Jacson (1755–1829), English botanist
- Alice Johnson (1860–1940), English zoologist
- Józefa Joteyko (1866–1928), physiologist, psychologist, pedagogist
- Josephine Kablick (1787–1863), botanist
- Helen Dean King (1869–1955), American biologist
- Phoebe Lankester (1825–1900), British botanist
- Marie-Anne Libert (1782–1865), Belgian botanist and mycologist
- Friederike Lienig (1790–1855), German-Baltic entomologist
- Beatrice Lindsay (1858–1917), English zoologist, writer, and editor
- Elizabeth Eaton Morse (1864–1955), American mycologist/cryptogamist
- Katharine Murray Lyell (1817–1915), British botanist
- Helen Abbott Michael (1857–1904), American botanist and chemist
- Olive Thorne Miller (1831–1918), American natural historian
- Maria Gugelberg von Moos (1836–1918), Swiss botanist
- Margaretta Morris (1797–1867), American entomologist
- Mary Murtfeldt (1848–1913), American biologist
- Eleanor Anne Ormerod (1828–1901), British biologist
- Edith Marion Patch (1876–1954), American biologist
- Maria Louisa Pike (d. 1892), American naturalist
- Beatrix Potter (1866–1943), British mycologist
- Mary Jane Rathbun (1860–1943), American marine biologist
- Margaretta Riley (1804–1899), British botanic
- Caroline Rosenberg (1810–1902), Danish botanist
- Ethel Sargant (1863–1918), British biologist
- Hazel Schmoll (1890–1990), American botanist working on plant life in Colorado
- Lilian Sheldon (1862–1942), English zoologist
- Alexandra Smirnoff (1838–1913), Finnish pomologist
- Annie Lorrain Smith (1854–1937), British lichenologist and mycologist
- Emilie Snethlage (1868–1929), German-Brazilian naturalist and ornithologist
- Nettie Stevens (1861–1912), American geneticist
- Jantina Tammes (1871–1947), Dutch botanist and geneticist
- Charlotte De Bernier Taylor (1806–1863), American entomologist
- Mary Treat (1830–1923), American naturalist
- Anna Vickers (1852–1906), marine algologist
- Jeanne Villepreux-Power (1794–1871), French marine biologist
- Anna Maria Walker (c. 1778–1852), Scottish botanist
- Elizabeth Andrew Warren (1786–1864), Cornish botanist
- Mary Anne Whitby (1784–1850), English breeder of silkworms
- Mary Pirie (1822–1885), Scottish botanist

=== Chemistry ===
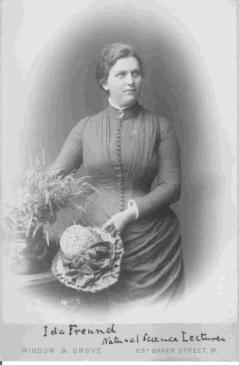
Ida Freund

- Vera Bogdanovskaia (1868–1897), Russian chemist
- Ida Freund (1863–1914), first woman to be a university chemistry lecturer in the United Kingdom
- Louise Hammarström (1849–1917), Swedish chemist
- Edith Humphrey (1875–1978), probably the first British woman to gain a doctorate in chemistry
- Julia Lermontova (1846–1919), Russian chemist
- Laura Linton (1853–1915), American chemist
- Rachel Lloyd (1839–1900), American chemist
- Adelaida Lukanina (1843–1908), Russian physician and chemist
- Helen Abbott Michael (1857–1904), American botanist and chemist
- Frances Micklethwait (1867–1950), British research chemist
- Muriel Wheldale Onslow (1880–1932), British biochemist
- Marie Pasteur (1826–1910), French chemist and bacteriologist
- Mary Engle Pennington (1872–1952), American chemist
- Agnes Pockels (1862–1935), German chemist
- Vera Popova (1867–1896), Russian chemist
- Anna Sundström (1785–1871), Swedish chemist
- Ellen Swallow Richards (1842–1911), American industrial and environmental chemist
- Margarete Traube (1856–1912), German-born chemist who lived in Italy
- Anna Volkova (1800–1876), Russian chemist
- Martha Annie Whiteley (1866–1956), English chemist and mathematician
- Nadezhda Olimpievna Ziber-Shumova (died 1914), Russian chemist

=== Engineers ===
- Mary Dicas (fl. 1800–1815), maker of scientific instruments
- Emily Roebling (1844–1903), American civil engineer

=== Geology ===
- Florence Bascom (1862–1945), American geologist
- Etheldred Benett (1776–1845), British geologist
- Mary Buckland (1797–1857), British paleontologist and marine biologist
- Margaret Crosfield (1859–1952), British paleontologist and geologist
- Maria Gordon (1896–1939), Scottish geologist
- Mary Emilie Holmes (1850–1906), American geologist and educator
- Charlotte Murchison (1788–1869), Scottish geologist
- Elizabeth Philpot (1780–1857), British paleontologist

=== Inventors ===
- Tabitha Babbitt (1779–1853), American inventor and tool maker
- Mary Brush (fl. 1815), American inventor
- Martha Coston (1826–1904), American inventor
- Ellen Eglin (1849–fl. 1890), American inventor
- Caroline Eichler (1809–1843), German inventor, instrument maker and prostheses designer.
- Hanna Hammarström (1829–1909), Swedish inventor
- Mary Kies (1752–1837), American inventor
- Margaret E. Knight (1838–1914), American inventor, first woman awarded a U.S. patent
- Huang Lü (died 1829), Chinese optic inventor

=== Mathematics ===
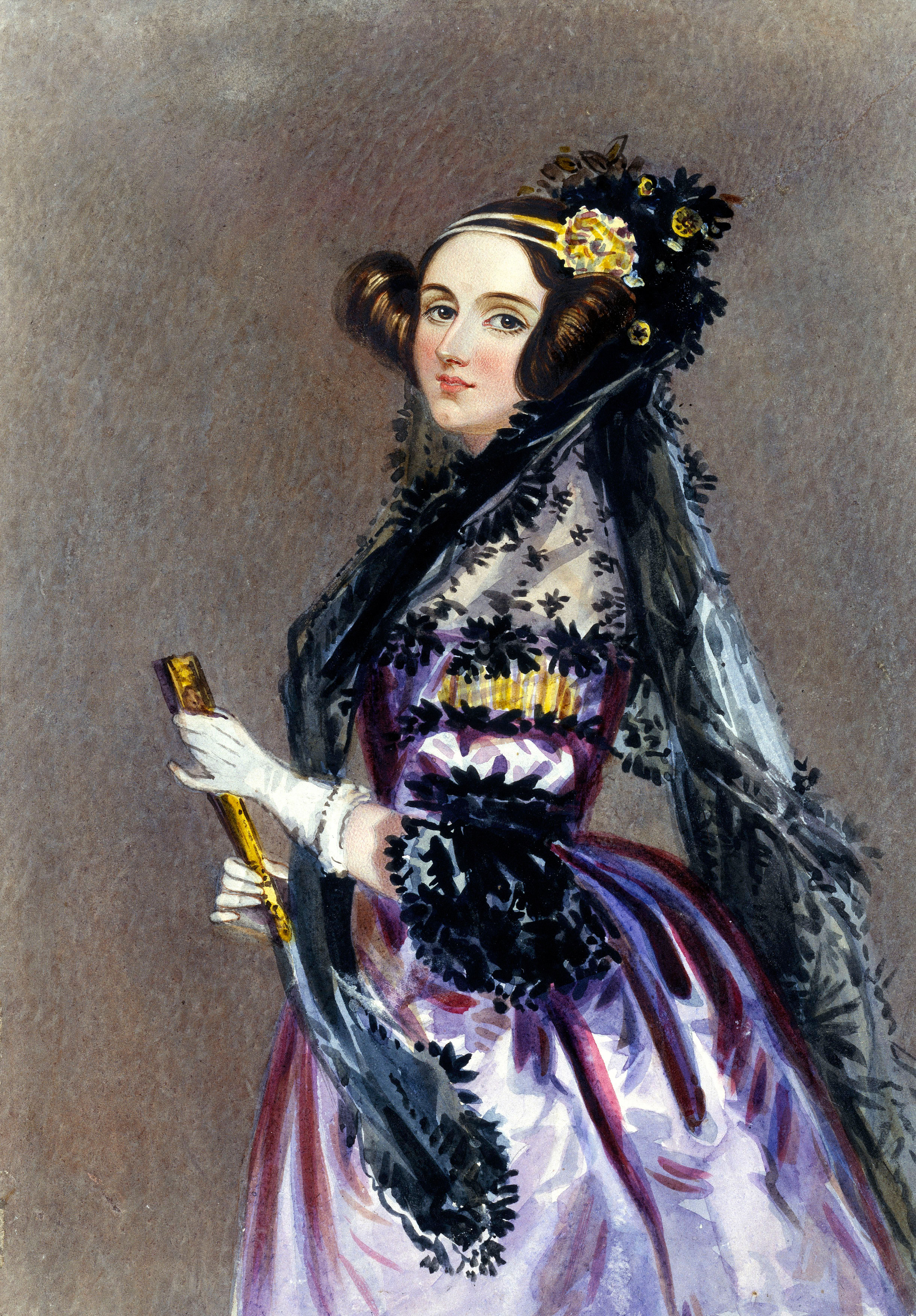
Ada King, Countess of Lovelace (Ada Lovelace)

- Sofia Kovalevskaya (1850–1891), Russian mathematician (partial differential equations, rotating solids, Abelian functions)
- Augusta Ada Byron Lovelace (1815–1851), British mathematician
- Emilie Martin (1869–1936), American mathematician
- Florence Nightingale (1820–1910), British statistician and nurse
- Emmy Noether (1882–1935), German mathematician

=== Microbiology ===
- Alice Catherine Evans (1881–1975), American microbiologist

=== Medicine ===
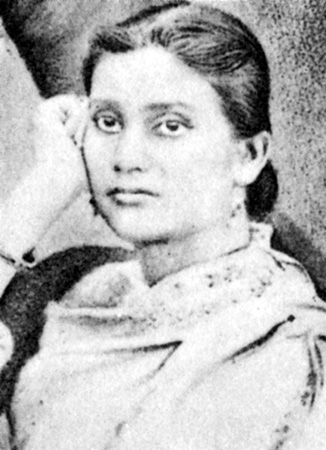
Kadambini Ganguly

- Rachel Alcock (1862–1939), British physiologist
- Elizabeth Garrett Anderson (1836–1917), British physician
- Hedda Andersson (1861–1950), Swedish physician
- Lovisa Årberg (1801–1881), first woman doctor and surgeon in Sweden
- Amalia Assur (1803–1889), Swedish dentist
- Sara Josephine Baker (1873–1945), American doctor (child hygiene pioneer)
- Chandramukhi Basu (1860–1944), Indian physician
- Elizabeth Blackwell (1821–1910), American physician
- Emily Blackwell (1826–1910), American physician
- Marie Boivin (1773–1841), French writer on obstetrics
- Elizabeth D. A. Cohen (1820–1921), American physician, first female physician in the state of Louisiana
- Rebecca Cole (1846–1922) American physician, by 1867 she was the second African-American woman to become a doctor in the United States
- Rebecca Lee Crumpler (1831–1895) American physician, by 1864 she was the first African-American woman to become a doctor in the United States
- Maria Dalle Donne (1778–1842), Italian physician
- Marie Durocher (1809–1893), Brazilian obstetrician, midwife and physician
- Enriqueta Favez (c. 1791–1856), Swiss physician and surgeon
- Rosalie Fougelberg (1841–1911), Swedish dentist
- Rupa Bai Furdoonji, Indian physician who was the world's first female anesthetist
- Kadambini Ganguly (1861–1923), Indian physician
- Johanna Hedén (1837–1912), Swedish midwife, feldsher and barber
- Aletta Jacobs (1854–1929), Dutch physician
- Maria Jansson (1788–1842), known as Kisamor, Swedish physician
- Sophia Jex-Blake (1840–1912), British physician
- Anandi Gopal Joshi (1865–1887), Indian physician
- Mary Poonen Lukose (1886–1976), Indian gynecologist
- Emmy Rappe (1835–1896), Swedish nurse
- Martha Ripley (1843–1912), American physician and suffragist
- Varvara Kashevarova Rudneva (1844–1899), Russian physician
- Florence R. Sabin (1871–1953), American medical scientist
- Ellen Sandelin (1862–1907), Swedish physician and teacher of physiology
- Regina von Siebold (1771–1849), German physician and obstetrician
- Charlotte von Siebold (1788–1859), German physician and gynecologist
- Anna Stecksén (1870–1904), Swedish pathologist
- Lucy Hobbs Taylor (1833–1910), American dentist
- Isala Van Diest (1842–1916), first female medical doctor and female university graduate in Belgium
- Catharine van Tussenbroek (1852–1925), Dutch gynecologist
- Mary Walker (1832–1919), American surgeon
- Karolina Widerström (1856–1949), Swedish physician
- Thora Wigardh (1860–1933), Swedish physician
- Marie Elisabeth Zakrzewska (1829–1902), Polish-American physician

=== Nuclear physics ===
- Lise Meitner (1878–1968), Austrian, Swedish, nuclear physicist

=== Physics ===
- Hertha Marks Ayrton (1854–1923), British physicist
- Margaret Eliza Maltby (1860–1944), American physicist
- Mileva Einstein-Maric (1875–1948), Serbian/Swiss physicist
- Alice Scouvart (1885-1932), Belgian scientist, student of Marie Curie
- Mary Somerville (1780–1872), British physicist, polymath
- Eunice Newton Foote (1819–1888), American inventor and physicist who first discovered rising carbon dioxide (CO_{2}) levels could impact climate

=== Psychology ===
- Mary Whiton Calkins (1863–1930), American psychologist
- Christine Ladd-Franklin (1847–1930), American psychologist
- Margaret Floy Washburn (1871–1939), American psychologist
- Anna Freud (1895–1982), Austrian-British psychoanalyst

=== Science education ===
- Jane Webb Loudon (1807–1858), Writer of introductory gardening books
- Jane Marcet (1769–1858), Writer of introductory science books
- Almira Hart Lincoln Phelps (1793–1884), American science educator
- Josephine Silone Yates (died 1912), American chemistry professor

=== Sociology ===
- Jane Addams (1860–1935), American sociologist
- Charlotte Perkins Gilman (1860–1935), American sociologist
- Beatrice Webb (1858–1943), English sociologist and economist

== See also ==
- List of scientists
- Lists of women
- Timeline of women in science
