= Péronelle =

Péronelle can refer to:

- Dame Péronelle (fl. 1292–1319), French herbalist physician
- Peronnelle L'Espicière (fl. 1292–1307), French spice merchant
- Péronelle, Countess of Dreux (1330-1397)
