= Luys =

Luys may refer to:

== People ==
- Guillemette du Luys
- Jules Bernard Luys (1828–1897), French neurologist
- Luys Ycart
- Luys d'Averçó (1350–1412), Catalan politician, naval financier, and man of letters

== Other ==
- Luys Alliance
- Luys foundation

== See also ==
- Luis
