= Susan Minns =

American philanthropist, benefactor, and collector

Susan Minns FAAAS FRSA
- Born: August 21, 1839; Lincoln, Massachusetts, US
- Died: August 2, 1938
- Burial place: Mount Auburn Cemetery
- Other name: Susan
- Education: Massachusetts Institute of Technology, Wellesley College
- Occupations: biologist, philanthropist, and collector

Susan Minns (born Susanna Minns, August 21, 1839 – August 2, 1938) was an American biologist, philanthropist, and collector. She was one of the first women to study at the Massachusetts Institute of Technology. She created a notable and extensive collection of art and literature relating Danse Macabre, a portion of which is now held by the University of Louvain. Minns helped establish the Marine Biological Laboratory and donated generously to numerous scientists, institutions and to her home state of Massachusetts.

== Early life ==
Minns was born to Frances Ann Parker and her husband Constant Freeman Minns on August 21, 1839 in Lincoln, Massachusetts. She began her education at private schools including the Cambridge School for Girls run by the naturalist Louis Agassiz. She also attended the Anderson School of Natural History set up by Agassiz on Penikese Island. She went on to graduate from Wellesley College. Minns was one of the first women to study at the Massachusetts Institute of Technology (MIT). She was a graduate of the class of 1881.

== Collecting ==
Minns created several collections over her lifetime. Her most notable was the collection she created from the age of 14 of art and literature relating to death and the Danse Macabre. Much of this collection was purchased by the University of Louvain through the generosity of Minns. Minns also created a collection of juvenile texts that she bequeathed to the Clapp Library of Wellesley College. She was a botanical collector, collecting botany specimens herself as well as obtaining specimens from other collectors. Her specimens can be found in the National Museum of Natural History, Smithsonian Institution, the Harvard University Herbaria, the New York Botanical Garden Herbarium, the University of Vermont Pringle Herbarium and University of Minnesota Bell Museum. These specimens continue to be used to further scientific research.

== Public service and philanthropy ==
Minns helped establish the Marine Biological Laboratory. In 1888 She was appointed a member of the inaugural board of trustees and was a signatory of the Laboratory's Act of Incorporation. She also served for several years on the Harvard University Committee of the Gray Herbarium.

Her donations of money and artifacts to individuals and institutions were substantial during her lifetime. She donated to land to MIT to be used for a river flow hydraulics laboratory. She donated $50,000 to Wellesley College as a memorial to Professor Susan Maria Hallowell in 1914. In 1917 Minns donated land to the Commonwealth of Massachusetts, including 127 acres on the Little Wachusett mountain, which was subsequently used to create the Minns Wildlife Sanctuary. In that year Minns also donated funds to the Arnold Arboretum.

In 1924 Minns made a substantial donation of $50,000 in honour of Mary Hancock, her great grandmother, to the Harvard Botanical Museum. Minns, when initially proposing this donation, explained to Oakes Ames that she was donating her great grandmother's twenty dollar gold piece. Ames' disappointment was allayed when Minns explained that this gold piece had been carefully invested and had transformed into a sizeable gift. In 1925 Minns made a donation to the Wellesley College Library of a collection of books illustrated by Kate Greenway. Also in the 1920s she made significant monetary donations aiding the construction of the botany section of Sage Hall at Wellesley College as well as ensuring improvements were made to the college library.

In June 1930 Minns donated funds to assist Professor Margaret Clay Ferguson of Wellesley College with her botanical research. In her will Minns established the Thomas Minns Fund in memory of her brother and enabling the creation of the Minns Lectures. In the 1940s the Susan Minns estate gifted portions of her art and literature collections to Wellesley College.

== Books and art ==
During the later part of her life Minns studied silkworms. In 1928 she authored a book entitled "Book of the silkworm", illustrating the book herself. She also wrote a book about her genealogy entitled "Minns and allied families in the line of descent of Miss Susan Minns". Minns was also a painter of watercolors and a creator of woodblock prints.

== Institution memberships and awards ==
Minns was a member of several institutions or societies. She was a member of Phi Beta Kappa. Minns was also a member of the Boston Society of Natural History from 1877 and remained a member for over 50 years. She was elected a Fellow of the Royal Society of Arts as well as a Fellow of the American Association for the Advancement of Science. Minns also had various scholarly works dedicated to her in appreciation and acknowledgement of her support.

== Death ==
Minns died on August 2, 1938 and was buried at Mount Auburn Cemetery.
