= Guillemette =

Guillemette may refer to:

== People ==
- Alphonse-Edgar Guillemette (1877–1950), Canadian politician
- Éloi Guillemette (1911–1984), Canadian politician
- Hélène Guillemette, Canadian politician
- Joanne Guillemette, U.S. politician
- Nancy Guillemette, Canadian politician
- Guillemette Andreu (born 1948), French Egyptologist and archaeologist
- Guillemette du Luys (fl. 1479), French surgeon
- Guillemette Laurens (born 1957), French opera singer
- Guillemette of Neufchâtel (1260–1317), French noblewoman
- Guillemette de Sarrebruck (1490–1571), French court official

== See also ==
- Guillemet, a punctuation mark
