= Sanyuan Palace =

Taoist temple in Guangzhou, People's Republic of China

Coordinates: 23°8′15″N 113°15′29″E

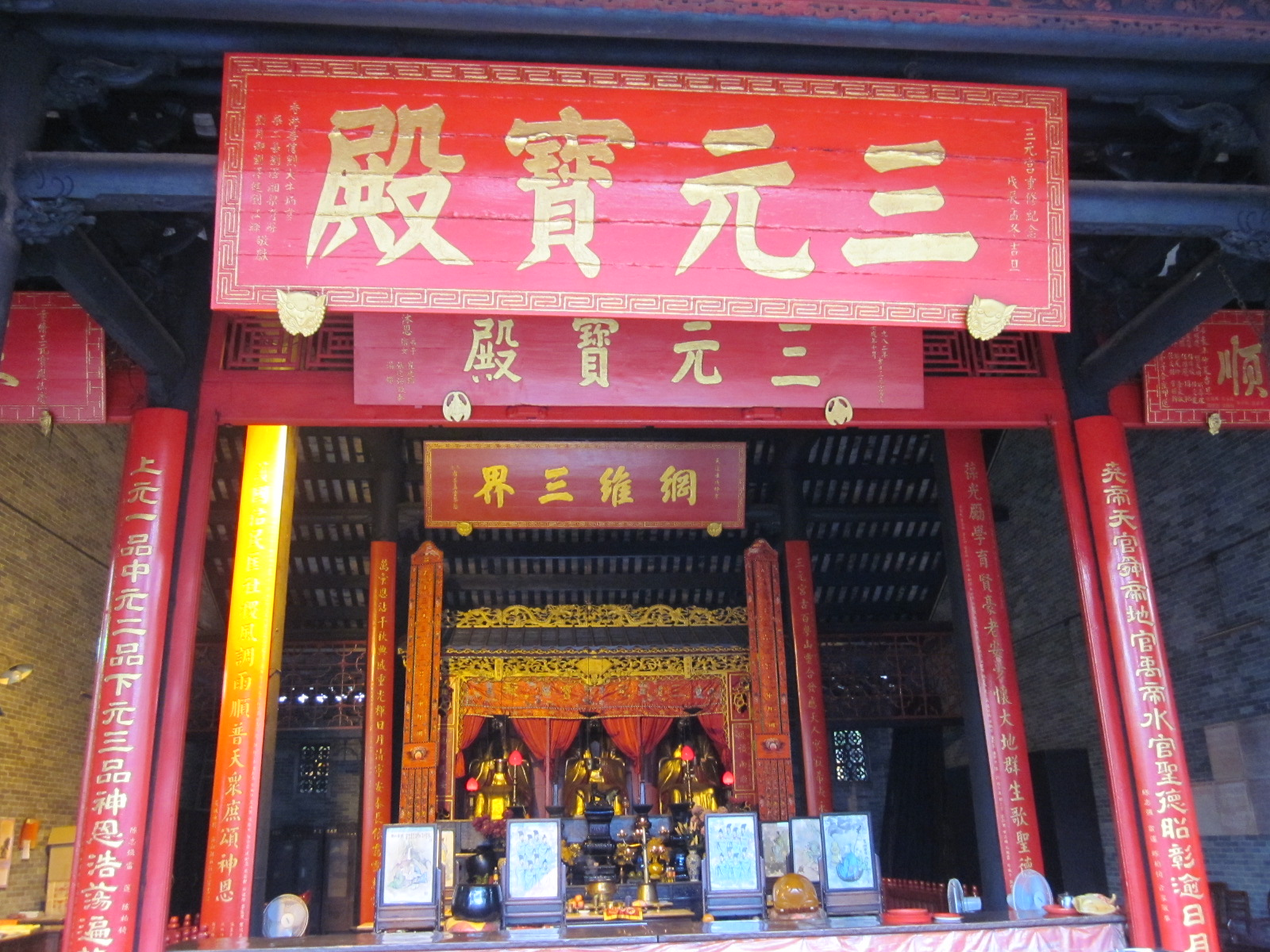
Sanyuan Palace.

Sanyuan Palace (simplified Chinese: 三元宫; traditional Chinese: 三元宮; Jyutping: Saam1 Jyun4 Gung1) is a Taoist temple dedicated to Three Great Emperor-Officials and is located in Yuexiu District of Guangzhou, Guangdong, People's Republic of China.

== History ==
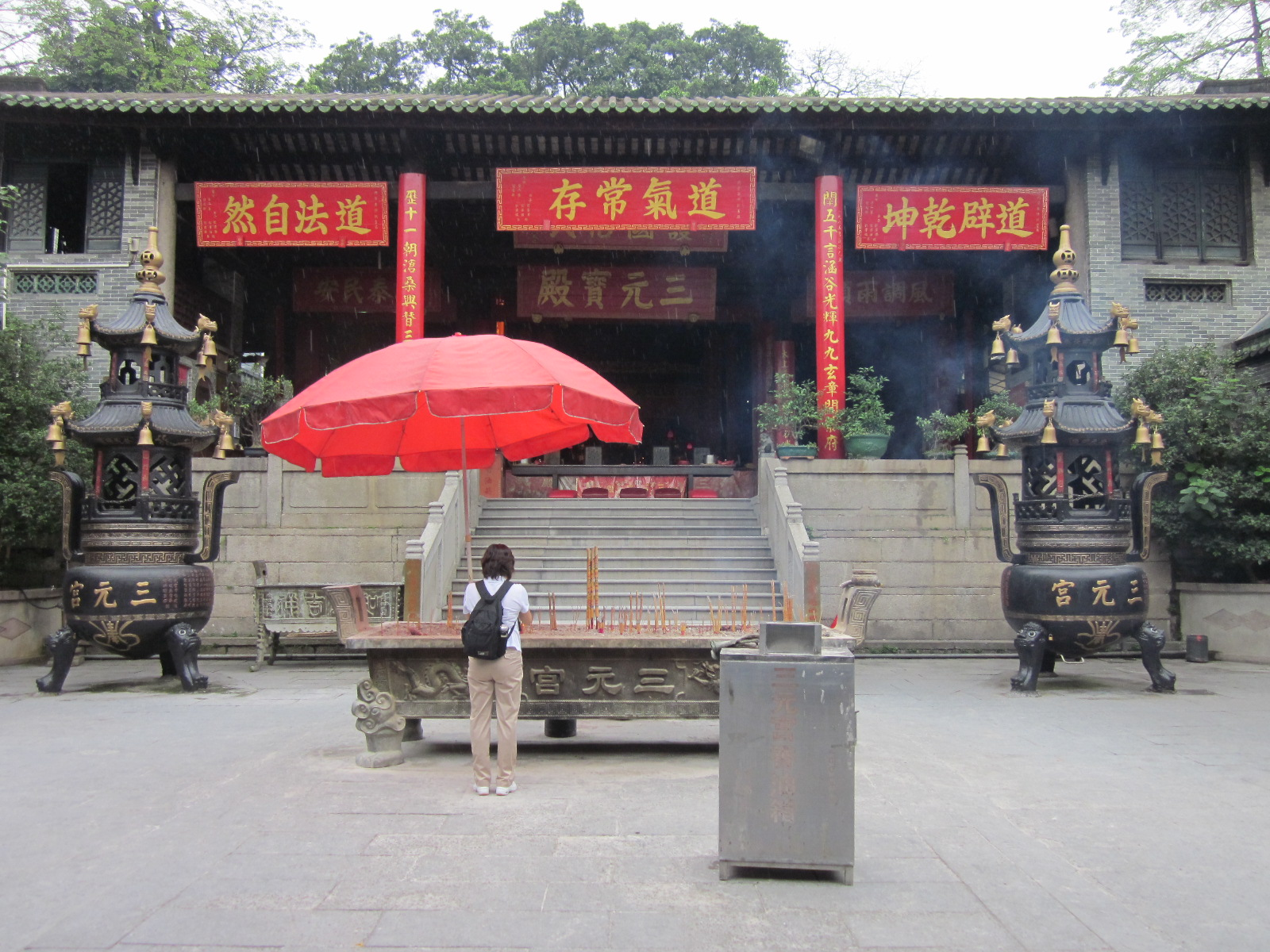
Sanyuan Palace.

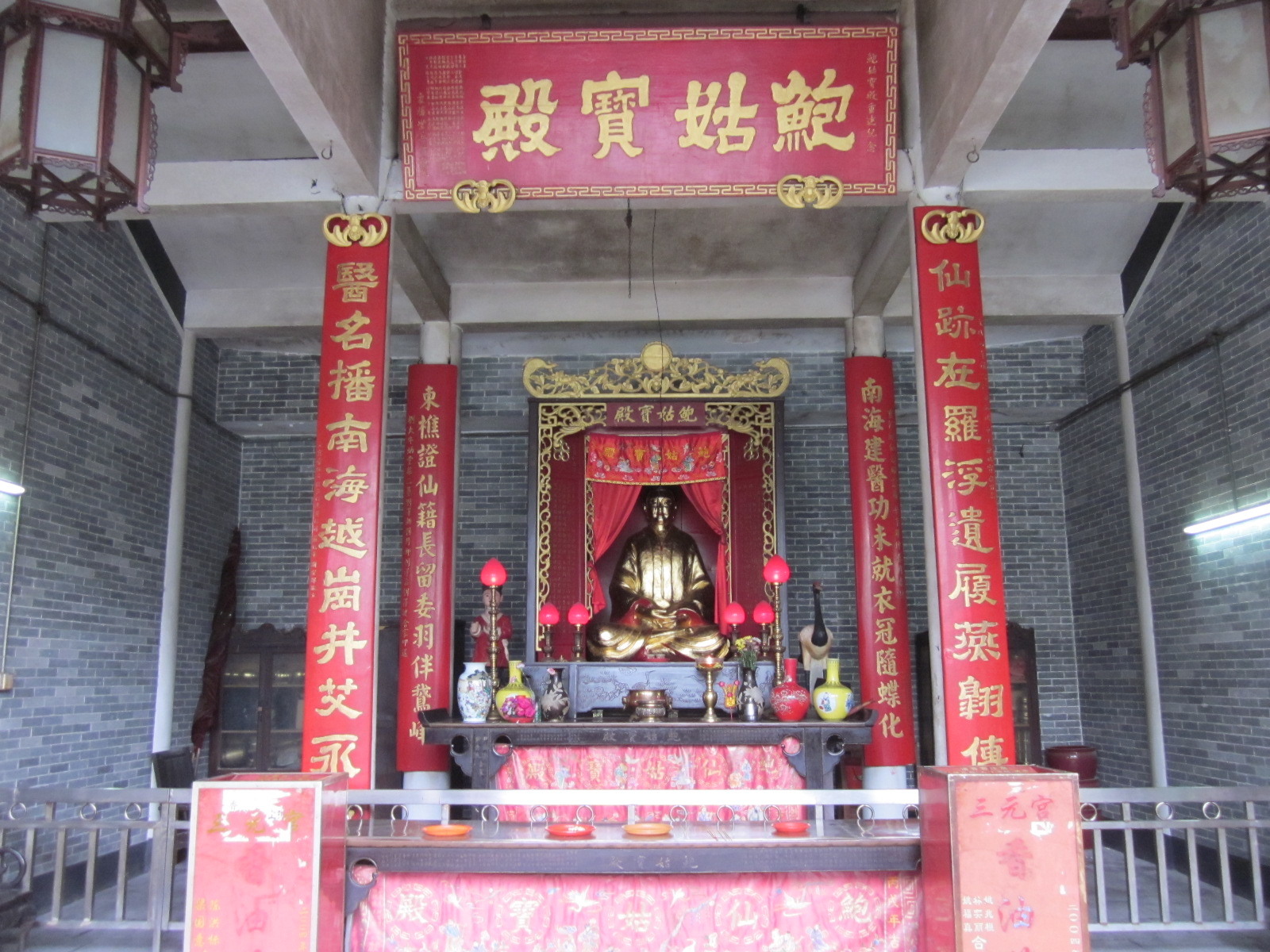
Bao Gu statue at Sanyuan Palace.

It was established in the Nanyue Kingdom, at that time it was called "Bei Miao" (北庙; Bak1 Miu6*2). The temple gradually fell into disuse after the kingdom was collapsed.

In the second year of the age of Daxing of Emperor Yuan of Jin, Nanhai governor Bao Jing revived the temple for his daughter Bao Gu to cultivate Tao while providing medical services to the locals and renamed the temple as "Yuegang Yuan" (越崗院; Jyut6 Gong1 Jyun2).

During the Tang dynasty, it was converted into a Buddhist temple and renamed "Wuxing Temple" (悟性寺; Ng6 Sing3 Zi6*2).

During the reign of Wanli Emperor, the temple was converted back to a Taoist temple and renamed "Sanyuan Palace". The temple was dedicated to Three Great Emperor-Officials, with another smaller shrine dedicated to Bao Gu.

In 1700, in the period of Kangxi Emperor, Master Du Yangdong (杜陽棟) became the abbot of the temple and extended the temple.

During the Cultural Revolution, the red guards fanatically smashed up the statues of the deities and valuable cultural relics, then forcefully occupied the temple. All religious activities were abruptly stopped and the temple was closed down.

In July 1982, Guangzhou People's Government reopened the temple and restored it as the status of Taoist temple. It was fully restored by 1990.

In December 1989, it was listed as a municipal culture and relics site.

== Cultural relics ==
- The stone statue of Guanyin, dated to the Tang dynasty.

Many other valuable cultural relics were destroyed during the Sino-Japanese war and cultural revolution.

== Bibliography ==
- "三元宫 浮浮沉沉，尘事阅尽 忧忧戚戚，道气常存". Southern Metropolis Daily (in Chinese). Archived from the original on 2014-05-13.
