= Drosera latifolia =

Scientific classification
- Kingdom: Plantae
- Clade: Tracheophytes
- Clade: Angiosperms
- Clade: Eudicots
- Order: Caryophyllales
- Family: Droseraceae
- Genus: Drosera
- Subgenus: Drosera subg. Drosera
- Section: Drosera sect. Drosera
- Species: D. latifolia

Binomial name
- Drosera latifolia (Eichler) Gonella & Rivadavia

Synonyms
- D. villosa var. latifolia (Eichler)

Species of carnivorous plant

Drosera latifolia is a species of sundew native to southern and south-eastern Brazil. It was first described as Drosera villosa var. latifolia by August Wilhelm Eichler in 1872, and elevated to species by Paulo Gonella and Fernando Rivadavia in 2014.

== See also ==
- List of Drosera species
