= Alice Maria Ottley =

American botanist (1882–1971)

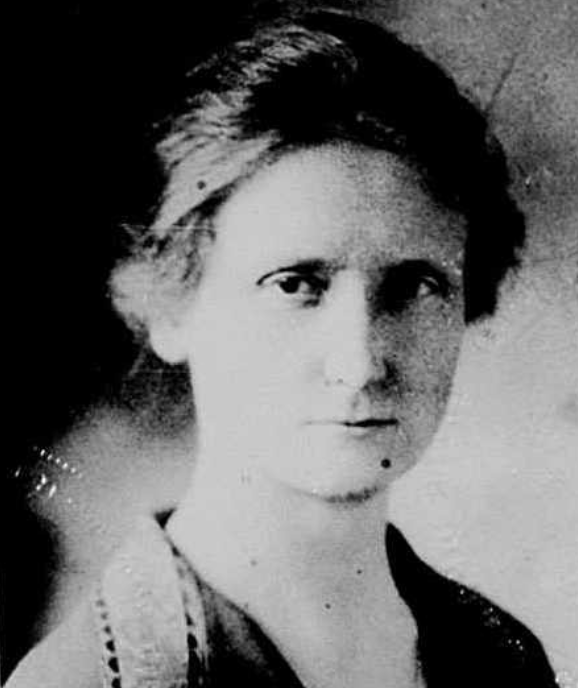
- Born: 1882; New York
- Died: 1971 (aged 88–89); Chula Vista
- Occupations: Botanist, botanical collector, university teacher, scientific illustrator, curator, scientific collector
- Employers: University of the Witwatersrand; Wellesley College

Signature
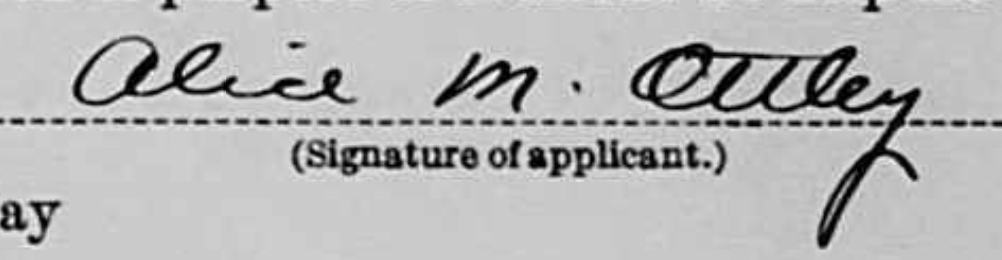

Alice Maria Ottley (1882–1971) was a botanist, author, assistant professor and curator of the herbarium at Wellesley College. She collected and studied American flora, particularly species of Lotus, and publishing books and articles on botany.

== Biography ==
Ottley was born on the 20th of November 1882 to Bell Mariah Ferguson and her husband Clarence Ottley. In September 1919 Ottley was appointed the assistant professor of botany at Wellesley College. Ottley was educated at Cornell University and the University of California at Berkeley, where she earned her PhD in 1921 under the direction of Willis Linn Jepson. She was an Exchange Professor for several months in 1925 at the University of Witwatersrand, South Africa. Ottley served as curator of the Wellesley Herbarium from 1922 to 1930 before becoming Department of Botany chairman. Ottley had an aunt who had been the Department of Botany chairman as well. Her aunt, Margaret Ferguson was well known in the field and was someone Ottley had a close relationship with. Over the years, the two had worked together on research between expeditions to South Africa and Mozambique and her time at Wellesley. Ottley was elected a member of Sigma Xi in June 1938. In 1939, she resigned from the faculty to travel and work with her aunt, the botanist Margaret Clay Ferguson.

In 1999 the plant genus Ottleya was named in her honour as a result of her being the first to describe the group, undertaking an important revision of its species and drew the attention to the flower symmetry as a taxonomic character in Papilionaceae-Loteae.

The standard author abbreviation Ottley is used to indicate this person as the author when citing a botanical name.

== Publications ==
- Ottley, Alice Maria (1909). The development of the gametophytes and fertilization in Juniperus communis and Juniperus virginiana. University of Chicago Press. OCLC 798116862.
- Ottley, Alice M. (1918) A Contribution to the Life History of Impatiens sultani Botanical gazette 66(4) 289–317.
- Ottley, Alice Maria (1923). A revision of the California species of Lotus. University of California Press. OCLC 3928973.
- Ottley, Alice M. (1938) The Occurrence of Centipeda minima in Wellesley, Massachusetts Rhodora 40, 219–220.
- Ottley, Alice M (1944). The American Loti with special consideration of a proposed section, Simpeteria. OCLC 78430978.
