= Eichler =

Eichler is a German surname. Notable people with the surname include:

- August W. Eichler (1839–1887), German botanist
- Caroline Eichler (1808/9–1843), German inventor, first woman to be awarded a patent (for her leg prosthesis)
- Eunice Eichler (1932–2017), New Zealand Salvation Army officer, nurse, midwife and open adoption advocate
- Glenn Eichler (born c. 1956), American TV comedy writer
- Jeremy Eichler (born 1974), American music critic
- Joseph Eichler (1900–1974), American residential real estate developer
- Martin Eichler (1912–1992), German mathematician
- Ralph Eichler (born 1950), Canadian politician
- Willi Eichler (1896–1971), German politician
- Yisrael Eichler (born 1955), Israeli politician

Eichler can also refer to:

- Eichler system, an early system of plant taxonomy
- an Eichler home, a primarily California-based style of midcentury architecture created by Joseph Eichler
