= Alexandra Smirnoff =

Pomologist (1838–1913)

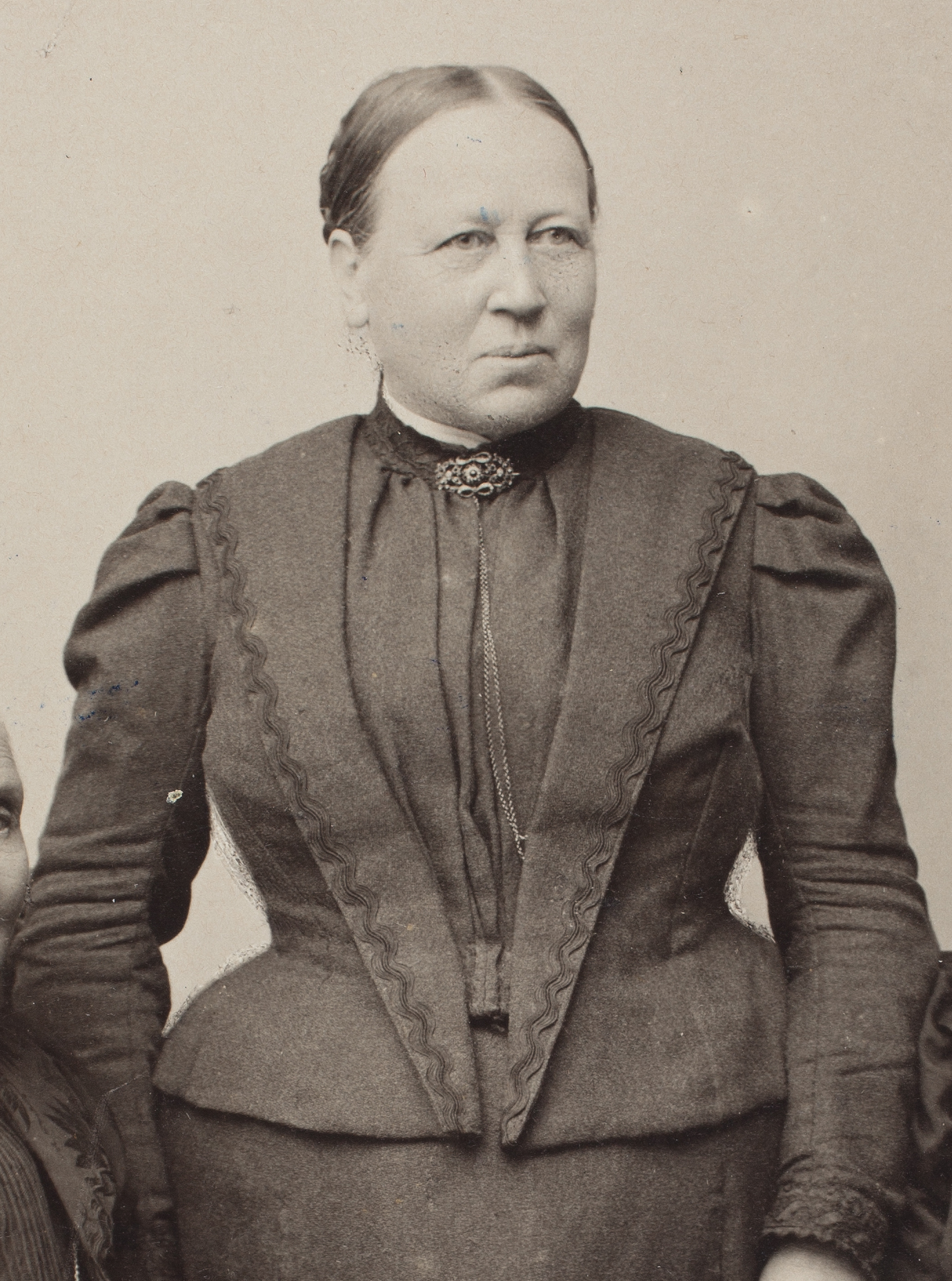
- Born: 1838; Vaasa
- Died: 1913 (aged 74–75); Helsinki

Alexandra Smirnoff (6 May 1838 – 25 September 1913) was a Finnish scientist, pomologist and writer. Her research had great influence in contemporary pomology in particularly Finland and Sweden.

== Early years and work ==
Alexandra Smirnoff was born in Vaasa. She was the first Nordic female pomologist. She studied different fruits and their cultivation. She started studying the field of pomology for about three years in 1873 in Södermanland in Sweden under the supervision of the well known pomologist Olof Eneroth. At the time he was editing a manual of pomology and he put Smirnoff in charge to classify Russian fruits because she knew Russian. She did a lot of research based on which she created and published a re edition of the Swedish Handbook of Pomology. Her work on the cultivation of this fruits helped not only for the classification of fruits but also helped for bringing many fruits from Russia into Finland. The book is called Suomen pomologiian käsikirja and it was published in 1894 in both Swedish and Finnish.

== Publications ==
Smirnoff has 24 works in 37 publications in 4 different languages including Finnish, Norwegian, Swedish and Russian. Some of her most famous publications include:

- Handbook i finsk pomologi
- Handbok i enklare trädgårdsodling lämpad för allmogehem
- Några ord om trädfruktodling och dess framtida ordnande i Finland
- Kukkaistarhan hoito : käsikirja monivuotisten kukkakasvien viljelemisestä ulkosalla
- Käsikirja yksinkertaisessa puutarhanhoidossa : kansaa varten

== Personal life ==
Smirnoff's parents were Michael Smirnoff and Klara Johanna Lindeqvist. When she was young she lived comfortably until one day her residential building caught fire in 1852. Her mother died after the fire and her father got ill slightly after. Since her father was not able to take care of his family anymore, Smirnoff was placed into foster care. She later got fostered by Countess Helena Stewen-Steinheil who was a botanist. She encouraged Smirnoff and she wanted her work to be known. After the Countess's death Smirnoff started traveling.

Her very first publication was in 1882 which was a study where she compared 40 different types of strawberry varieties. Because of her work she became very famous in her country. She considered public education and women's work important because she did not receive proper education like her brothers until she met Dr. Olof Eneroth.

== Awards ==
- Smirnoff was awarded the Russian Domain Ministry's silver medal for the work that she had done in the Handbook of Finnish pomology
- She also was awarded the state author's prize 1910 for the work Care of the Flower Garden
- The state also gave her an annual pension in 1907 as a form of recognition for her work.
