= Adelmota of Carrara =

14th-century Italian physician

Adelmota of Carrara (fl. 1318–1324) (also known as Adelmota Maltraverse) was an Italian physician and obstetrician from Padua. The daughter of the Count of Castelnuovo, she married James, Prince of Carrara.

Little is known about Adelmota except the notes by the writer Joannes Rhodius (1587–1659) (a Danish scholar who lived in Padua in the 17th century) who stated in his book Scribonius Largus that Adelmota was "a most learned physician" and especially skilled as an obstetrician.

According to Baudouin, she practiced medicine between 1318 and 1324.
