= Peronnelle L'Espicière =

French spice merchant

Peronnelle L'Espicière (fl. 1307), was a French spice merchant. She was the official spice merchant of the King of France between 1299 and 1307, an unusual office and title for a woman in the 13th-century.

== Life ==
She was first noted as a spice merchant in Paris in 1292. She inherited a spice business with her brother Pierre, which was not uncommon at the time. However, in the tax register she was taxed for more than her brother and he is mentioned only as "her brother Pierre", following the formula used in official documents when identifying who was the head of the business, which was evidently her. This separated her from most merchant sisters in Paris, who were normally a passive business partner when inheriting a business with their brothers.

Peronnelle was a successful merchant and paid he biggest taxes in her neighbourhood Petit Point, where the king lived, between 1296 and 1300. She was the highest taxed spice merchant in Paris. Her success and dominance in the business is reflected in the tax records: most of the spice merchants in Paris paid a tax of 1 livres, while Peronnelle paid 6-8 livres.

In 1299, Peronnelle was listed as the official spice merchant to the king, with the title Espicière le roy. This was an honorary title given to those providing spices to the royal family. It was unusual for a woman to be given the title of royal supplier, and this only occurred a handful of times during the Middle Ages: Peronnelle de Crepon was the king's tapestry master in 1374, another woman by the name Peronnelle was the official glove maker of the king in 1368–75, with Jeanne of Dammartin taking that title in 1387, while Jeanne L'Espicière was the official spice merchant of another member of the royal family, the countess of Artois.

Peronnelle L'Espicière is last mentioned in the year 1307, when she was still the official spice supplier of the king. Documentation is lacking after the year 1307 and her life after that, as well as how long she had the office, is unknown.
