= Luys Foundation =

Luys Foundation (Armenian: Լույս Հիմնադրամ) was a private foundation based in Armenia. It supported education, scholarship and economic growth for Armenia by supporting full-time enrolled students across the globe.

== History ==
Founded in 2009 by President Serzh Sargsyan and Prime Minister Tigran Sargsyan, the scholarship initially began with criteria that a student had to be admitted to a "top 25" world-ranking University to qualify. As resources became limited, the scholarship criteria scaled back the ranking requirement, only funding students who were admitted to a "top 10" world-ranking institution. The organization funded over 500 scholars in its nine years of existence.

When Sargsyan resigned in 2018, incoming Prime Minister Nikol Pashinyan was elected, and Luys staff were let go and the organization was dismantled. In May 2018, the announcement was made that the Luys Foundation would cease its operations.
