= Sotira (physician) =

Sotira (1st-century) was an obstetrix, or Ancient Greek obstetrician, who was mentioned by Pliny the Elder as an author of treatises on postpartum fever and menstruation. She is believed to have lived in the 1st century.
