= Bao Jing =

Taoist immortal

Chinese name
- Traditional Chinese: 鮑靚
- Simplified Chinese: 鲍靓
Transcriptions
Standard Mandarin
- Hanyu Pinyin: Bào Jìng
- Wade–Giles: Pao Ching
Yue: Cantonese
- Jyutping: Baau^{6} Leng^{3}
Middle Chinese
- Middle Chinese: BˠauX d͡ziᴇŋH
Old Chinese
- Zhengzhang: Bruːʔ Zleŋs

Korean name
- Hangul: 포정
- Hanja: 鮑靚
Transcriptions
- McCune–Reischauer: P'o Chŏng

Japanese name
- Kanji: 鮑靚
- Hiragana: ほうせい
Transcriptions
- Revised Hepburn: Hō Sei

Bao Jing (鮑靚, 260?–330 CE) was a Chinese philosopher. He was a Daoist xian ("transcendent; 'immortal'") was best known for having been a disciple of the transcendent master Yin Changsheng from whom he received the Taixuan Yin Shengfu (太玄陰生符; "Yin Sheng's Talisman of Great Mystery"), and for having transmitted a version of the Sanhuang wen (三皇文; "Writings of the Three Sovereigns") to his disciple and son-in-law Ge Hong.

== Names ==
Bao Jing's courtesy name was Tàixuán (太玄; "Great Mystery"), which is a common Taoist term, e.g., Yang Xiong's c. 2 BCE Taixuanjing ("Canon of Supreme Mystery"), and the "Great Mystery" section of the Taoist Canon. He is honorifically called Bao Taixuan or simply Bao Xuan.

Another famous Taoist with the same surname is Bao Jingyan (鮑敬言), whose "anarchistic" views were partially preserved in an Outer Chapter of the Ge Hong's Baopuzi. Joseph Needham says it "remains an open question" whether Bao Jing and Bao Jingyan were the same person.

== Life ==
According to different sources, Bao Jing was born in Chenliu (present-day Kaifeng, Henan), Shangdang (Changzhi, Shanxi), or Donghai (southern Shandong and northern Jiangsu). He is famous for having announced to his parents, at age five, that he was the reincarnation of a son of the Li family of Quyang (Hebei) who fell into a well and died when he was nine years old. Raised in a family of Han dynasty scholar-officials, including Bao Xuan (鮑宣, d. 3 CE) and Bao Yong (鮑永, d. 42), Bao Jing studied Daoism, Confucianism, esoterica, and astronomy. He had a successful career as a Western Jin dynasty official and was appointed Governor of Nanhai (Guangdong) in 313. In 318, he met the transcendent Yin Changsheng, who recognized his aptitudes and instructed him in Daoist techniques of immortality. Two years later he left his office and retired to Jurong (Jiangsu) or Danyang (near Nanjing, Jiangsu), where he practiced esoteric Daoist longevity techniques. Early texts record that Bao Jing was buried at Mount Luofu (Guangdong) or Shizigang (石子岡, Jiangsu), but his remains supposedly disappeared by means of shijie ("corpse liberation"), which enabled an adept to feign death and assumeng a new identity as an earthbound transcendent.

The hagiography of Bao Jing in the Shenxian zhuan ("Biographies of Divine Transcendents"), which is partially attributed to the Daoist scholar Ge Hong (283-343), is a primary source of information. The Shenxian zhuan scholar and translator Robert Ford Campany analyzed the earliest dates by which various parts of the text are attested, and found that the Bao Jing material existed prior to 650.

Bao Jing, styled Taixuan 太玄 was a native of Langye. He lived during the reign of Emperor Ming of Jin [r. 323-325], and was the father of the wife of Ge Hong. Lord Yin [Yin Changsheng] bestowed on him a method of "escape by means of a simulated corpse." One version has it that Bao was a native of Shangdang and was descended from Bao Xuan 鮑宣 a Director of Convict Labor during the Han. He cultivated his body and nourished his nature, and when he had passed the age of seventy he escaped and departed. There was one Xu Ning 徐寧. who served Bao Jing as his teacher. One night Xu Ning heard the sound of zither music coming from Bao's room. He asked about it and was told, "Ji Shuye 嵇叔夜 formerly left a trace at the eastern market, but actually he achieved 'martial liberation' (bingjie)."

Ji Shuye is the courtesy name of Ji Kang (226-262), the famous Daoist poet and gujin virtuoso, who was executed on fabricated charges. This Shenxian zhuan context implies that Ji Kang faked his death in order to elude the imperial and spiritual bureaucracies. Bingjie (兵解; "deliverance by a military weapon" or "escape by execution") is a method of shijie liberation for those who have been executed, such as Zuo Ci (155–220).

The Shangqing classic Jianjing (劍經; "Sword Scripture"), preserved only in fragments, says Bao Jing carried out the bingjie procedure.

Formerly, Ge Hong maintained that Lord Yin transmitted to Bao Jing a method of escape by means of a simulated corpse. Later [Bao Jing] died and was buried .... Someone opened his coffin and saw in it [only] a large sword. Around the tomb could be heard the sounds of men and horses, so [the robbers] did not dare remove [the sword].

This text claims that the method transmitted to Bao Jing by Yin Changsheng involved only a talisman, not an elixir, and that it was merely an evasive "escape by means of a simulated corpse" stratagem, using a talisman-empowered sword as one's substitute body.

The 648 Book of Jin biography of Bao Jing, which is untranslated, describes him exchanging texts and methods with his disciple Ge Hong, and says that "Jing once met the transcendent Lord Yin, who transmitted instructions of the Dao [daojue (道訣)] to him. He died at an age of over one hundred."

The Book of Jin biography of Ge Hong mentions Bao Jing several times, specifically in terms of neixue (內學; 'inner study'; "esoteric studies"), which includes self-cultivation, alchemy, breathing exercises, special sexual practices, medicine, magic spells, amulets, charms, and techniques of immortality.

Ge Hong made another close friendship, that of Bao Jing. Likewise a noted devotee of and authority on neixue, Bao Jing is particularly well known as an expert on the Yellow River Map and Lo Shu Square. He was knowledgeable not only in the various aspects of neixue and magic, but in the classics as well. He is reputed to have been an expert on various sorts of magic, and his official biography mentions his innate knowledge of unusual events. As governor of the Nanhai region, he held considerable political power; and he was a conscientious official, ever bearing in mind the needs of the people he governed. The two became very close friends. Bao Jing gave his eldest daughter to Ge Hong in marriage.

== Traditions and texts ==
Early Daoist schools and traditions affiliate Bao Jing with four textual and doctrinal legacies: he was a disciple of the late Han dynasty and Six Dynasties transcendents Yin Changsheng and Zuo Ci, and a master of Ge Hong (283-343) and Xu Mai (許邁, 300–348).

=== Yin Changsheng ===
First, Bao reportedly met and began studying Daoism in 318 with the immortal Yin Changsheng, who gave him the Taixuan Yin Shengfu (太玄陰生符; "Yin Sheng's Talisman of Great Mystery"), a supernatural Daoist talisman enabling adepts to achieve shijie ("release from the corpse"), which was a method of feigning death and assuming a new identity as an earthbound transcendent.

=== Zuo Ci ===
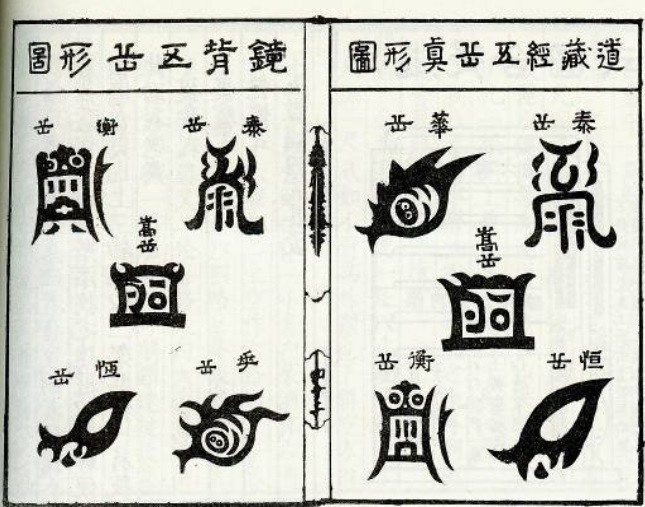
Page from the Wuyue zhenxing tu (五嶽真形圖; "Charts of the Real Forms of the Five Peaks"), Gao Lian's 1591 Zunsheng bajian (遵生八箋; "Eight Treatises on the Nurturing of Life")

Second, Bao Jing was a disciple of the transcendent Zuo Ci, who allegedly presented him with the Wuyue zhenxing tu (五嶽真形圖; "Charts of the Real Forms of the Five Peaks") and alchemical writings. This text provides cartographic, esoteric, and talismanic functions for Daoist sacred mountains.

=== Ge Hong ===
A third tradition concerns Ge Hong (283-343) retiring to Mount Luofu (Guangdong) in 312, where he became the disciple and son-in-law of Bao Jing. He married his master's eldest daughter Bao Gu (鮑姑), who was a famous female physician in Chinese history. Bao instructed Ge in Daoist alchemy and transmitted a version of the Sanhuang wen (三皇文; "Writings of the Three Sovereigns") that had been divinely revealed to him while meditating in a cave on Mount Song.

Daoist legends differed over whether the Sanhuang wen was revealed to Bo He (帛和, fl. 300) or to Bao Jing. The former narrative says the transcendent Wang Fangping (王方平) instructed his student Bo He to stare at the north wall of a grotto on Mount Emei (Sichuan) until he could discern the Chinese characters that ancient Daoists had engraved, which was revealed after three years of wall gazing. Ge Hong's c. 330 Baopuzi attributes it to Bo He and describes the Sanhuang wen, called the Sanhuang nei wen (三皇内文, Esoteric Writings Script of the Three Sovereigns), as providing protective talismans with divine powers to quell demons and banish misfortune. Ge quotes his teacher Zheng Yin (鄭隱, c. 215-c. 302) saying that there are no more important Daoist books than the Sanhuang nei wen and Wuyue zhenxing tu. "Of old, transcendent officials and perfected persons venerated and kept secret the Way [taught in them]; unless one has a transcendent's name, they cannot be bestowed on one. They are transmitted once every forty years. He to whom they are transmitted swears an oath [of secrecy] by smearing his lips with blood and makes a covenant by surrendering pledge-offerings." The context further says ancient Daoist writings were hidden away in "caves", that is, grotto-heavens, on "all the famous mountains", and besides 40-year transcendent master-disciple revelations, they could also be revealed by mountain deities to deserving adepts like Bo He, who "got his in a mountain, and immediately set up an altar, made a present of silk, drew one ordinary copy, and then left with them."

The latter revelation narrative says that during the Yuankang era (291-299) of the Jin dynasty, when Bao Jing was fasting and meditating in "Lord Liu's grotto" at Mount Song, the "writings spontaneously carved themselves on the walls". Both Dao'an's Erjiao lun (二教論; "Essay on the Two Teachings") and Zhen Luan's Xiaodao Lun (Essays to Ridicule the Dao), which were presented to Emperor Wu of Northern Zhou in a 569-570 court Buddhist-Daoist debate, report that the Sanhuang wen was revealed to Bao Jing on the walls of a cave, and when imperial authorities discovered this, the Sanhuang wen was proscribed and "he was sentenced to death".

=== Xu Mai ===
Shangqing School sources document the fourth Daoist tradition about Bao Jing, who is claimed to have been the master of Xu Mai (許邁, 300- 348), a chief recipient of the visionary Yang Xi's "Shangqing revelations" of 364-370. Xu Mai was head of the aristocratic Xu family in Jurong (Jiangsu) that sponsored Yang Xi. In 346 he changed his name to Xu Xuan (許玄), travelled to sacred Daoist mountains, and supposedly disappeared as a xian transcendent.

The Shangqing patriarch Tao Hongjing's 499 Zhen'gao, which codified the "Shangqing revelations", disparages Bao Jing. It says he was still living on Mount Mao and had not yet "departed". "They [Bao Jing and his sister] are now both Agents Below the Earth [dixia zhu zhe (地下住者)]; they reside in the cavern-palaces. As for what [Bao Jing] received and practiced, he was by nature of only meager talent, and was furthermore obstinate, so he did not obtain much."
