= Yi Xu =

Chinese physician

Yi Xu (also Yi Jie, Yi Jiao, Yi Ju) (Chinese: 義姁, fl. 2nd-century BC), was a Chinese physician. She is known as one of the famous four female physicians in Chinese history, along with Zhang Xiaoniang of Northern Song dynasty, Gu Bao of the Jin dynasty and Tan Yunxian, who was active during the Ming dynasty. She was active during the reign of Emperor Wu of Han.

Some scholars suggest she was the first female physician in Chinese history. She is recorded as having given medical treatment to the Empress Dowager, Wang Zhi (empress), and, in general, she served as a physician who treated the women who lived within the royal palace.
