= Maria Petraccini =

Italian anatomist and physician

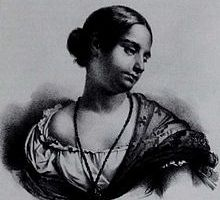
Maria Magdalena Petraccini

Maria Magdalena Petraccini (or Pettracini, or Petrocini) Ferretti was an Italian anatomist, physician, professor of anatomy. She was born in Florence, Tuscany, 1759 and died in Bagnacavallo, Ravenna, 1791.

== Biography and personal life ==
Pettracini was born in a merchant family in Tuscany. She married Italian physician and anatomy professor Francesco Ferretti. She became interested in surgery thanks to him, who was the chief at the Bagnacavallo hospital. Subsequently, Petraccini was tutored in surgery by her spouse, who taught her by operating on corpses. Her technique became so precise that she was envied even by those above her. She was so good that in September of 1788, the Florence Medical Board deemed her worthy of their university, at a time when the medical profession wasn't left up to women.

On 13 September 1788 she became a medical student at the University of Florence. Here she followed the lessons of professors Lorenzo and Angelo Nannoni, who also taught her obstetrics.

Petraccini and her husband then moved to Ferrara, where she continued her training at the 'Arcispedale Sant'Anna di Ferrara', where "in the presence of the Professors of Humanity she gave public essays of deep anatomical knowledge operating on corpses".

She graduated at the University of Ferrara, and became a member of the university's board. She also gave a demonstration and lecture of anatomy before the board of medical professors.

== Career in medicine ==
Maria Petraccini was active as a teacher in anatomy at the University of Ferrara. Her daughter, Zaffira Ferretti, was also active as a teacher at the university in the same subject. The universities of Salerno and Bologna were centers of medical education in Italy and known as the locations where most female anatomists and physicians were active. The careers of Pettracini and her daughter indicate that Ferrara also encouraged women as students and teachers.

Maria's daughter, Zaffira Ferretti, seems to have inherited her mother's talents, for she studied Surgery at the University of Bologna, and there she also received a medical degree in May 1800. She obtained an appointment under the Italian government, and for some time lived in Ancona acting as director-general of the midwives in all parts of the country.

== Major works and philosophy ==
After the birth of her daughter in 1789, Pettracini published books about the care of infants and women in childbirth (1789). Her most famous being 'Memoire on the physical education of children' ("Memoria per servire alla fisica educazione dei bambini"). This was a century characterized by cultural revolutions, in which new scientific and pedagogical conceptions made their way, which Ferretti tried to spread in order to give new dignity to childhood: "I abandon the ghost of prejudice and, despising vulgar sentiment, I arm myself in favor of innocent humanity". Yet she was aware of the difficulties caused by her being a woman because, as she bitterly wrote in the preface to the work: "I, however, do not cease to be a woman, and therefore an object, which may deserve little consideration from others".

Her writing was certainly influenced by her reading of Rousseau's 'Émile', and by the work of Nicolas Andry De Boisregard, dean of the Medical Faculty of Paris and founder of modern orthopedics.

In the book, she protested against the contemporary practice of bandaging of infants, which she claimed could lead to injuries and deformations, proclaimed that infants should be allowed to move their limbs. She advocated breastfeeding, a custom practiced at that time only by women of low class, the aristocrats and the rich bourgeoisie keeping a wet nurse in the house specifically for this purpose, or sending the infants home to her. Maria advised that: "three hours after childbirth it is good that the woman attaches her baby to her breast".

At a time when women played a traditional role within the family, generally following the education of children only in their earliest childhood, Maria, on the contrary, proposed an extremely modern model, which was certainly affected by the concern derived from the enormous infant mortality, which had become a real scourge.

To the newborn baby she prescribed lukewarm baths and quiet rest, comfortable clothes, or "a shirt rather large [...] so that nothing that could serve as an impediment to its small movements". She recounted the hours spent happily together with her son who, at only 7 months old, was able to move freely and began to crawl; although worried by the reactions of her fellow citizens, she made another choice against the tide at the time of weaning, gradually replacing her milk with "three or four times a day a well-cooked minestrone". With this diet, the child grew strong until, at one-year-old, he began to walk. And so the author was able to conclude her manual proudly, presenting the result of a robust and slender child, hoping that her experience could be followed by other mothers to improve the quality of life of their children.

In the meantime she continued her studies and together with her husband ("an intrepid husband accompanies my tenderness, and determines me to think without prevention"), or alone, she visited patients, especially children, practicing the profession at home and giving advice to the few aristocratic mothers of the place, as well as to the women of the people.

Her method had a strong impact on her fellow citizens, who came to see her most often motivated by simple curiosity, even if they did not always agree with her.

== Accomplishments ==
In February 1789, the Council of Elders of Bagnacavallo wanted to officially recognize the professional value of her activity and gave her a grant to assist free of charge the poor women of the countryside, both in obstetrics’ art and surgery: in this way Maria officially became part of the medical staff "Di Condotta".

Maria Magdalena Petraccini Ferretti died prematurely at the age of 32, in circumstances not known until now.
