= Margaret Clay Ferguson =

American botanist (1863–1951)

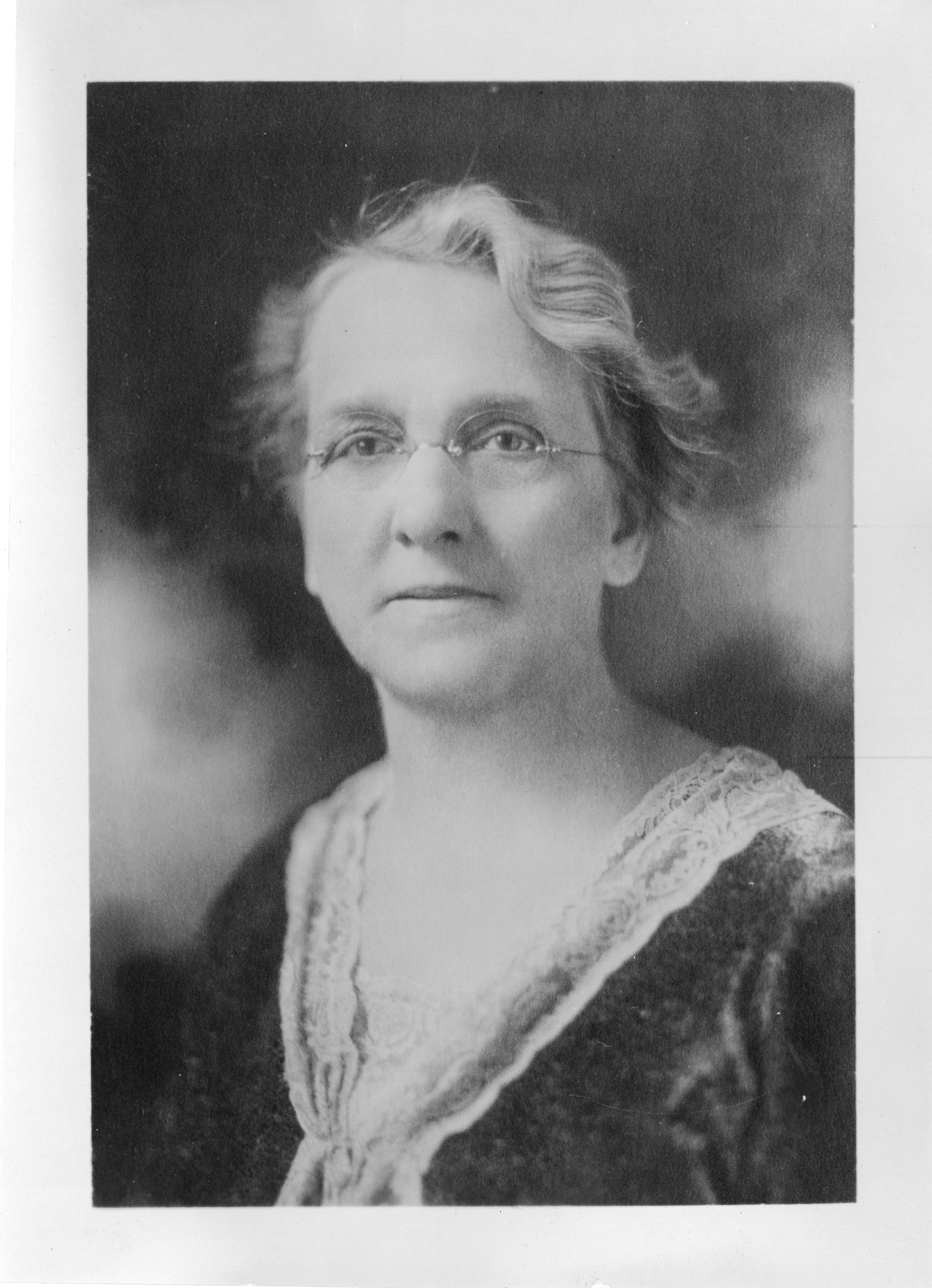
- Born: August 29, 1863; Orleans, New York, United States
- Died: August 28, 1951 (aged 87); San Diego, California, United States
- Known for: First woman president of the Botanical Society of America
- Awards: Honorary doctorate from Mount Holyoke College
- Scientific career
- Fields: Botany
- Institutions: Wellesley College
- Author abbrev. (botany): M.C.Ferguson

Margaret Clay Ferguson (1863–1951) was an American botanist best known for advancing scientific education in the field of botany. She also contributed on the life histories of North American pines.

== Early life and education ==
Ferguson was born in Orleans, New York, in 1863 and attended the Genesee Wesleyan Seminary in Lima, New York. Ferguson attended Wellesley College, where she graduated in botany and chemistry in 1891, earning a PhD in botany from Cornell University in 1901.

She was the first female President of the Botanical Society of America in 1929.

== Career ==
Ferguson became the first female President of the Botanical Society of America in 1929 and began working as a professor of botany and head of the department at Wellesley College in 1930. She collected botany specimens with her niece Alice Maria Ottley.

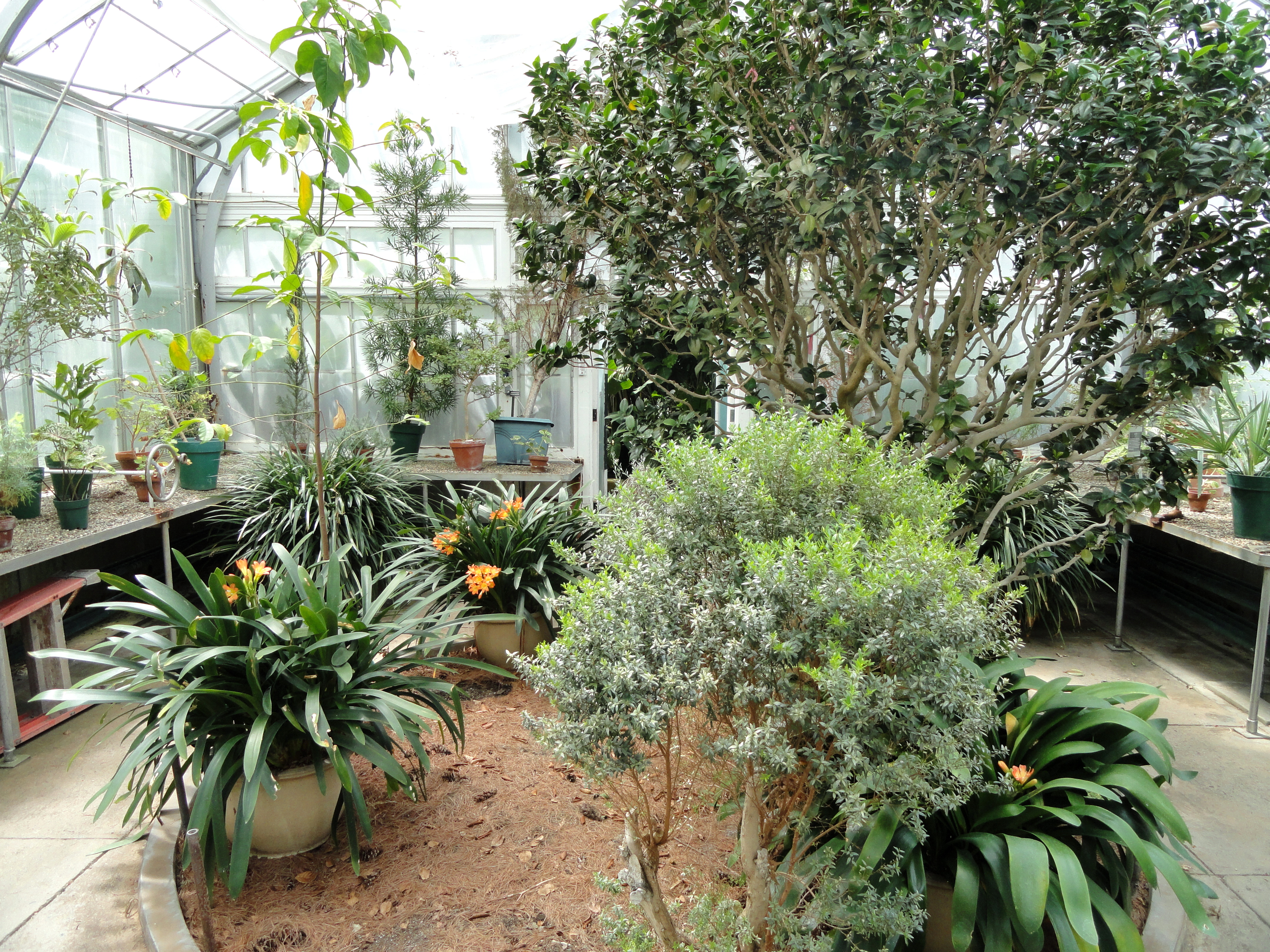
Seasonal Display House in the Margaret C. Ferguson Greenhouses at Wellesley College

Ferguson studied a variety of systems including Fungi, Pine and Petunia. Her study on the latter revealed how plant flower color and pattern do not follow Mendelian laws of inheritance. Ferguson encouraged many women botanists during her time at Wellesley College, where lab work was a major part of her teaching.

In 1931, Susan Minns donated funds to Wellesley College to support Ferguson in her research. In 1932, Ferguson retired from Wellesley College, though she continued researching until 1938. She received an Honorary doctorate from Mount Holyoke.

Greenhouses in the Wellesley College Botanic Gardens are named in her honor.

== Private life ==
In her later years, Ferguson spent time in Florida before moving to San Diego, where she died of a heart attack in 1951.

== See also ==
- Timeline of women in science
