= Olympias of Thebes =

Ancient Greek midwife and writer

Olympias of Thebes was a Greek midwife who lived in the first century B.C.E. She was also a writer. She was distinguished among the ancient Greeks for her medical writings and medical ability.

Pliny wrote that Olympias stated that mallows "with goose grease ... cause abortion" and that she could cure a type "of barrenness. . . by bull's gall, serpents' fat, copper rust and honey, rubbed on the parts before intercourse".

It is also likely that Dioscorides knew about her work.
