= Sarah of Saint-Gilles =

French physician

Sarah of Saint-Gilles (Latin: Sara de Sancto Aegidio; died after 1326) was a French physician.

Sarah lived in Marseille. She was Jewish, the daughter of Davin and the widow of a physician named Avraham. Her practice and medical knowledge is known through a contract with her student, Salvet de Bourgneuf of Salon-de-Provence, which is dated August 28, 1326. The contract states that Sarah was to instruct him in medicine for seven months, and also provide him with lodging and clothing. In return, Sarah's pupil was to give her any earnings that he might receive during his apprenticeship. This document is the earliest and best known example of this type of teacher-student contract.
