= Zhang Xiaoniang =

Chinese physician

Zhang Xiaoniang (11th-century), was a Chinese physician in the Song Dynasty. She was active during the reign of Emperor Renzong of Song (r. 1022 – 1063). She is known as one of the famous four female physicians in Chinese history, along with Yi Jia of Western Han dynasty, Gu Bao of the Jin dynasty and Tan Yunxian of the Ming dynasty.

She was known primarily as a surgeon, and is recorded as treating wounds such as abscesses and carbuncles.
