= Susan Hallowell =

American botanist

Susan Maria Hallowell
- Born: August 25, 1835; Bangor, Maine
- Died: December 15, 1911 (aged 76); Wellesley, Massachusetts
- Scientific career
- Fields: Botany

Signature
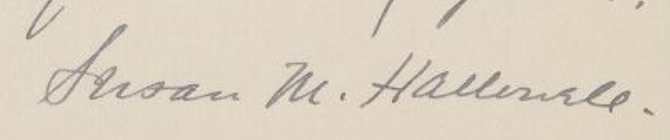

Susan Hallowell (1835–1911) was an American botanist and Professor of Botany at Wellesley College. She was a teacher and mentor of botanist Margaret Clay Ferguson.

== Life ==
Hallowell began a teaching career shortly after graduating from Colby College.

She was the first woman to be admitted to the botanical lectures and laboratories of the University of Berlin, although this was not achieved with ease, as arriving in Europe she found that the universities on the continent were closed to women.

Hallowell taught in Bangor High School for more than 20 years, while continuing her own education in her spare time. In order to further her knowledge, she worked in the Boston laboratories of botanists Asa Gray and Louis Agassiz.

=== Wellesley College ===
By 1875, Henry Durant, the founder of Wellesley College, had become familiar with Hallowell's work in the Gray and Agassiz laboratories. He appointed her Chair of Natural History, a department which she then divided into zoology and botany departments.

Hallowell formed the original Botany Department, and became the first Chair and Professor of Botany in 1877. The many botany courses she developed rarely changed in format, only needing additional or new scientific knowledge and discoveries incorporated into them. She built up a botanical library.

It is said that Hallowell cultivated her 'disciples', inviting her pupil Margaret Clay Ferguson from the class of 1891 to major in botany. Hallowell hired Ferguson as an instructor in 1893, and appointed her as the Head of the Botany Department in 1894. Ferguson later oversaw the creation of the arboretum and botanic garden as well as the 1925 greenhouse complex, the present day Margaret C. Ferguson Greenhouses.

In 1902, when Miss Hallowell was 67 years old, she retired from her position as professor. From that time on she was Emeritus Professor of Botany at Wellesey.

Susan Hallowell was a member of the Torrey Botanical Society, which was instrumental in founding the New York Botanical Garden.
