= Mary Albertson =

American botanist (1838 – 1914)

Mary A. Albertson (21 June 1838 – 19 August 1914), born Mary Ann Mitchell, was an American botanist and astronomer. From 1904 to 1914, she curated the Maria Mitchell memorial located on Nantucket Island, Massachusetts. Her work there covered both the nascent botany department and the astronomical observatory. In the botany department, she curated an herbarium of Nantucket plants, in memory of her cousin Mitchell's love of flowers. She died in 1914 on Nantucket Island.

Albertson's daughter Alice Owen Albertson was the author of the book Nantucket Wildflowers (G. P. Putnam's Sons, 1921).
