= Magistra Hersend =

Magistra Hersend, also called Hersend or Magistra Hersend Physica (floruit 1249–1259, Paris) was a French female surgeon who accompanied King Louis IX of France on the Seventh Crusade in 1249. She is one of two women recorded as royal physician or surgeon.

Magistra Hersend was an important woman in the life King Louis IX. She was the medical attendant to King Louis IX and attended the queen, Margaret of Provence. Her most important role was accompanying King Louis IX on the seventh crusade. Because of her work and loyalty to the king and queen, King Louis IX granted her a life pension of twelve pence a day. Later on, Magistra Hersend married the king's apothecary, one Jacques. She was one of the women who attended the royal couple and female camp followers.

== See also ==
- Guillemette du Luys
