= Thora Wigardh =

Swedish physician (1860–1933)

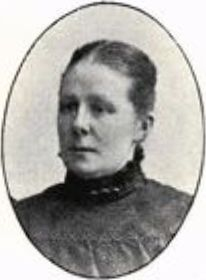
- Born: 7 June 1860; Gothenburg, Sweden
- Died: 13 October 1933 (aged 73); Gothenburg, Sweden
- Education: Karolinska Institute
- Occupation: Physician
- Known for: First woman in the Gothenburg Doctors Association

Thora Alfhilda Evelina Wigardh (7 June 1860 – 13 October 1933) was a Swedish physician and gynecologist. She specialised in women's issues, and fought for women's rights. She was the first female doctor active in Gothenburg and was the first woman to be elected into the Gothenburg medical society.

== Life and work ==
Thora Wigardh was born on 7 June 1860. She was one of seven children of customs administrator Jan Otto Granström and Maria Elisabeth Wiliamson and spent her early years in Gothenburg as well as in Marstrand and Sölvesborg.

She was a student at the Kjellbergska flickskolan (Kjellbergska girls' school) in Gothenburg, and she was a teacher for five years before taking her matriculation exam as a private practitioner in Lund in 1886, becoming a medical candidate at the Karolinska Institute in Stockholm in 1892 and a medical licentiate there in 1897. As a pioneer female medical student, her experience was difficult, with sexual harassment and discrimination. The Uppsala female students' association was founded in 1892 to advocate for women, and Wigardh was the first deputy chair, while the chair was Lydia Wahlström.

Wigardh immediately began working as a physician, specifically, she was a gynecologist and became well known as a lecturer. She was the first woman in the Göteborgs Läkaresällskap (Gothenburg Doctors Association).

She was a practicing physician in Gothenburg from the same year and the first female member of the Gothenburg Medical Society. She was a suffragist and a member of the Gothenburg branch of the National Association for Women's Suffrage (Sweden).

The street Doktor Wigardhs Gata (Doctor Wigardh Street) at södra Guldheden in Gotheborg is named after her.

== Personal life ==
On 19 December 1897, she married fellow medicine licentiate Pontus Erland Wigardh (1866–1907) but he died only a decade later after an illness.

On 23 October 1933, Thora Wigardh died and was buried in the family gravesite in the Eastern cemetery, Gothenburg.
