= Bao Gu =

Taoist practitioner and renowned physician

Bao Gu (Chinese: 鮑姑, bāogū, fl. 4th-century, also known as Pao Ku Ko), was a Chinese Taoist physician. She was the daughter of accomplished Taoist practitioner and governor Bao Jing, and the wife of Ge Hong, who is the author of Baopuzi. She is also known as one of the famous four female physicians in Chinese history, along with Zhang Xiaoniang of Northern Song dynasty, Yi Xu of the Western Han dynasty, and Tan Yunxian, who was active during the Ming dynasty. She was active during the Eastern Jin dynasty.

== Life ==
Bao Gu, also known as Bao Qianguang, was born in c. 309 into the family of a government official Bao Jing. Her family believed in Taoism and his interpretation of Taoist doctrines influenced Bao's interests.

Ge Hong became a disciple of her father Bao Jing, and studied alchemy with him. Bao Jing saw that he was eager to learn and thought highly of him, so he betrothed his daughter, Bao Gu, to him. After marrying Ge Hong, they practiced Taoism and medicine together.

Bao Gu is known as the first female moxibustion practitioner. Although she did not leave behind any medical works, an urban legend describes her encounter with an insecure young girl with a face covered in warts. By igniting moxa root and applying it to specific acupoints, she treated the girl making her beautfiful again.

In the second year of Daxing of the Eastern Jin Dynasty (319 AD), Bao Jing built a Taoist temple for his daughter Bao Gu to practice Taoism and medicine. It was named Yuegang Temple (now Sanyuan Palace, Guangzhou City). After Bao Gu's death in c. 363, it expanded to become a memorial temple in her honor. In the first year of Jianyuan of the Eastern Jin Dynasty (343 AD), Ge Hong passed away in Mount Luofu. Bao Gu and her disciple Huang Chuping went to Yuegang temple, both to treat people's illnesses and to repair roads. She inherited the medical skills of her father and her husband, and improved on it through her own research. Because of the efficacy of her medicine, people called her Baoxiangu, with xiān indicating her immortalized status.
