= Peretta Peronne =

Early unlicensed female surgeon

Peretta Peronne was an unlicensed female surgeon operating in Paris in the early fifteenth century.

== Background ==
The legacy of Peretta Peronne is known exclusively through her prosecution by the Parisian medical faculty in 1411. The Commentaries of the Parisian medical faculty record the expenditures associated with pursuing cases against practitioners as well as the charters of the Parisian university, which provide documentation for their efforts towards legal recognition of their positions on medical practice. The faculty sought to increase the status of physicians and to emphasize the necessity for training and licensing in order for a medical professional to be recognized as legitimate. This effort in Paris was part of a larger movement in early modern Europe to denounce all non-university-trained medical professionals, including surgeons, barbers, and apothecaries, as either inferior or altogether illegitimate. However, in France, the delineation between the types of medical practitioners was becoming particularly rigid during this time period, as professionalization of the medical field was increasingly discussed in the ecclesiastical and political realms.

Throughout the Middle Ages, women participated in medical practice across a variety of disciplines. While history has typically focused on women's roles as caregivers within the domestic sphere, as wet nurses and midwives, historian Monica H. Green has argued that "one of the greatest myths of female practitioners in the middle ages is that they primarily treated female complaints.". Towards the end of the Middle Ages, increased regulation and legal repercussions against their practice became significant enough that the profession of a woman physician began to disappear from the historical record. The prosecution of Jacoba Felicie in 1322 was an early example of the emergence of this mindset in France.

== Prosecution ==
Peronne was brought before the Master Surgeons of the University of Paris in 1411. She had been pursued by the St Damien and St Cosme surgeons' confraternity, which consisted of approximately eleven members. They had approached the Paris medical faculty for assistance in bringing about a case against Peronne because she had been displaying a sign outside her home advertising herself in the "manner of a public surgeon." This surgeon's guild and the university seemingly viewed the work that Peronne was performing as a threat to their well-being and the distinct separation between the work of physicians and surgeons, as she is the only case of a female surgical practitioner being prosecuted by the Parisian medical faculty during this time. By the fourteenth century, surgeons, as well as barbers and apothecaries, were typically free from prosecution by the faculty if they were members of a guild that was supervised and regulated by the medical faculty. Women were not permitted to be members of surgeons' guilds, and were typically excluded from guild participation entirely outside of the textile industry or having widow status. Additionally, women were not prosecuted if they worked exclusively as midwives, with the dying elderly or the very young. Peronne's home surgical practice was catered toward both sexes and advertised procedures she had not received the ordained training or licensing for. The Parisian faculty saw an opportunity to make an example out of her in an attempt to dissuade her contemporaries from similar behaviour, rather than expending resources to prosecute all women in Paris acting as surgeons.

Once formally prosecuted, Peronne was required to remove her advertisement from her home and cease her surgical practice until she had been examined. Some historical sources suggest that she was imprisoned during the examination process. University prosecution records indicate that she had to turn in her surgical textbooks for examination by physicians and the criminal clerk and that she was to be interviewed by the physicians in the presence of practising surgeons.

During her defence proceedings, Peronne stood by her assertion that she was a proven practitioner doing work for God, and stressed that she needed to carry on her work "because she has many sick persons or patients under her care, who required essential remedies and visitation."

== Trial outcome ==
The physicians at the Parisian medical faculty ultimately concluded that Peronne was not knowledgeable about the content of the surgical books that she possessed and that she could not differentiate between the letter "A from a faggot". The university faculty ordered that she permanently remove the public surgeon sign from her house; however, records indicate that she continued to work. Peronne's ability to continue her practice after a trial and possible imprisonment indicated that the attempts of male physicians to bar women and non-licensed practitioners from medical work were not completely successful. The requirements of formal training limited the number of "legitimate" physicians available in Paris, yet the needs for medical assistance were not eliminated, especially within the realm of surgery, which was considered inferior. The public continued to seek the assistance of women surgeons such as Peronne if they thought that they were skilful and effective entities.

== Sources ==
- Dumas, Geneviève “les femmes et les pratiques de la santé dans le “Registre des plaidoiries du Parlement de Paris 1364-1427”, Canadian Bulletin of Medicine, 13 (1996), pp. 13–27
- Fissell, Mary E. "Introduction: Women, Health, and Healing in Early Modern Europe." Bulletin of the History of Medicine 82.1 (2008): 1–17.
- Hunt, Tony. The Medieval Surgery. Woodbridge, Suffolk, UK: Boydell, 1992. Print.
- Lawler, Jennifer. Encyclopedia of Women in the Middle Ages. Jefferson, North Carolina: McFarland, 2001. Print.
- O’Boyle, Cornelius, “Surgical texts and social contexts: Physicians and Surgeons in Paris c. 1270-1430” Practical Medicine from Salerno to the Black Death, ed. Luis García-Ballester, et al. (Cambridge: CUP, 1994), pp. 156– 185.
