= Dame Péronelle =

French herbalist (fl. 1292–1319)

Dame Péronelle (floruit in 1292–1319), was a French herbalist physician. She is also mentioned in a contemporary folk story.

Dame Péronelle was active in Paris where she practiced medicine as an herbalist. She was successful, which is confirmed by the fact that she paid a very high tax in 1292. In 1319, she was most probably the same herbalist who traveled from Paris to Artois to be consulted by the countess Mahaut of Artois. The practice medicine as a herbalist in this time period was not unusual for a woman. However it is unusual to have documentation of a woman herbalist working for royalty and aristocracy, competing with male doctors with formal education. In this time period herbalist were not properly considered physicians due to their use of natural herbs to cure illnesses. Common herbs used in the middle ages were Sage, Betony, Hyssop, Chamomile etc. Each individual herb has specific healing properties that can aid in healing of the Sick.

== Fiction ==
After Dame Péronelle died she became a French folk tale in the story called "La Chanson de Péronelle." Guillaume de Machaut, the famous 14th-century French poet and composer mentioned in the story she did have admirers and muses, but there is no definitive evidence that Péronelle existed or that their love story took place.
