= Caroline Eichler =

German instrument maker, designer and orthopedic technician

Margarethe Caroline Eichler
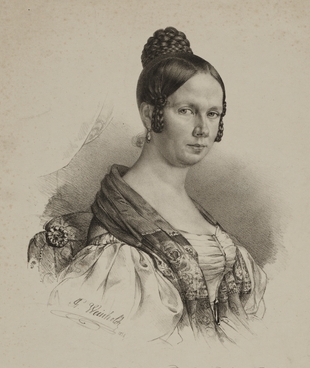
- Born: 1808 or 1809
- Died: 6 September 1843; Berlin, Germany
- Occupation: Prosthetic inventor
- Known for: Inventor of the first practical modern hand prosthesis

Margarethe Caroline Eichler (born in 1808 or 1809; died 6 September 1843 in Berlin) was a German inventor, instrument maker and prostheses designer. She was the first woman in Prussia to receive a patent (for her leg prosthesis) and was also the inventor of the first practical modern hand prosthesis.

== Biography ==
Caroline Eichler was born in 1808 or 1809, presumably in Nordhausen or Berlin, as the third daughter of painter Johann Gottlieb Eichler. In those days, young women were usually denied higher education opportunities or apprenticeships, and although no documentation has been found describing her schooling, her work demonstrates a knowledge of physics and technical mechanics. Around 1826 Eichler was working as a nanny and later worked as a nurse.

== Life ==
While working as a nurse, Eichler was struck by the misery of amputees and "found myself particularly stimulated when, in the course of my business of nursing, I noticed the manifold sufferings of such unfortunate people. (...) So I pursued the idea of (...) inventing and representing a machine that was capable of making the suffered loss of the leg of the person concerned less sensitive and detrimental."

In 1832, Eichler designed and constructed a prosthetic leg with a knee joint, for which she received a 10-year patent on 23 November 1833, the first woman in Prussia to receive a patent. (Until Eichler, a leg prosthesis was rigid; "a stilted foot, an immovable piece of wood that was strapped to the stump, was common. Carpenters, blacksmiths and saddlers built it.") She also received patents for the Russian Empire and, on 13 January 1835, for the Kingdom of Bavaria as well. Her leg and foot patent allowed her to be the exclusive manufacturer and seller of her prosthetic for ten years:

'The unmarried Karoline Eichler here herself is on November 23, 1833 a ten consecutive years, (...), and valid for the entire scope of the Prussian state: on a, in its entire composition for new and peculiarly recognized artificial leg for Replacement of the upper and lower leg, given,' reports the Allgemeine Preussische Staats-Zeitung of December 1, 1833.

Eichler advertised her prosthetic leg and foot in a self-published text, in which she proudly announced that her design had passed inspection by Johann Friedrich Dieffenbach, head of surgery at Berlin's Charité Hospital, who reported on the successful use of the prosthesis for one of his patients and "expressly praised the design."

She continued her prosthesis development, creating another one for an artificial hand, for which she also received a Prussian patent on 24 November 1836. This was the first usable self-powered upper limb prosthesis on record. Eichler then built a trade in Berlin by manufacturing prostheses.

On 30 October 1837, Caroline Eichler married a man seven years her junior, the mechanic Friedrich Eduard Carl Krause from Bielefeld. She later divorced him but, even after the divorce, Krause repeatedly "extorted money from her." On the evening of 6 September 1843, Krause came to Eichler's Berlin apartment again, asking for money, when an argument ensued, during which, according to the criminal report, Krause murdered her with a pointed file. She died at age 34.

== Leg prosthesis ==
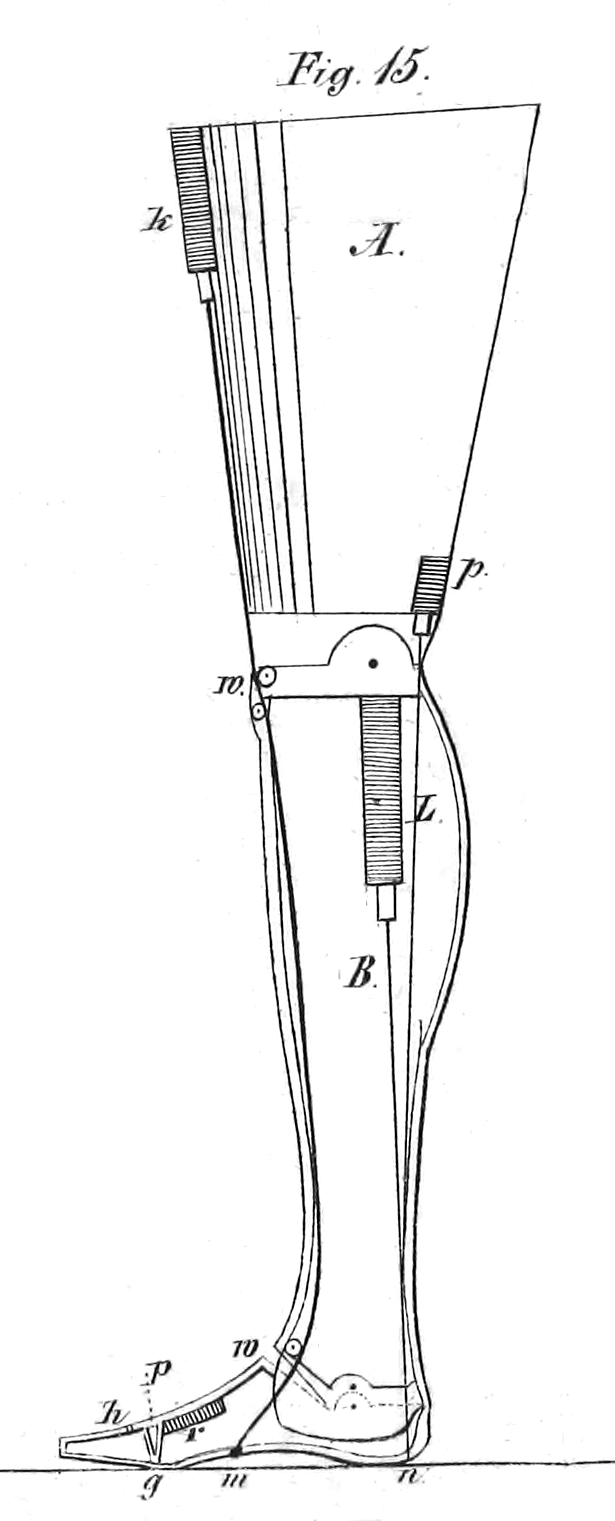
Artificial leg developed and patented by Caroline Eichler.

The leg prosthesis developed by Eichler featured several advances over competing designs from that time. For example, her leg had a mobile, independently working knee joint, which was not previously available. Earlier designs either had no knee joint or, like the artificial legs described by the surgeon Ambroise Paré in the 16th century, had to be operated by pulling a cord.

Eichler's construction consisted of a tinplate, brass (and later nickel silver sheet) shaft for the leg's stump, a hollow lower leg made of linden, willow or poplar wood glued over with canvas, and a foot with two parts, which were also made of wood, all attached to the jointed leg piece. The sheet metal for the femoral shaft could be cold-formed relatively easily, allowing the stump attachment to be adjustable. One of its important features was the weight of the prosthesis. It was much lighter in comparison to a solid wooden structure and weighed only about 2.1 kilograms (4.6 lb).

Based on her experience as a nurse, Eichler gave great importance to the device's practical usability. Until then, it was common practice to fit prosthetic legs directly against the stump, which made long-term use impossible. In contrast, Eichler designed her prosthetic to fit on the stump after it was tightly wrapped with bandages and then a padded leather funnel. Then the prosthesis was pulled over the bandages and hung over the shoulder by a strap that was attached to the front and back of the funnel to avoid unnecessary pressure on the thigh stump.

Her design allowed the knee joint to work without a locking device. It moved using a combination of gut strings and pressure-loaded coil springs, which, according to Eichler, were designed to correspond to human tendons and muscles. Her mechanism allowed the knee to bend while walking, and the springs brought the leg back to its extended starting position when it was lifted. The amputee did not have to help out by pulling a string.

Eichler favorably compared the amputee's effort required to walk with her prosthesis to that of a toddler learning to walk or someone learning to dance. She said crutches were not necessary with her design as only a walking stick was required, and after a training period of one to two weeks, one would be able to walk on paved and unpaved floors and even climb stairs without using even a stick.

=== Reception ===
Experts from the Prussian Ministry of Medicinal Products and the Ministry of Trade and Industry subjected the prosthesis to an extensive examination before a ten-year patent was finally granted 23 November 1833. Eichler also received recommendations from numerous doctors, including those on the General Staff, Johann Wilhelm von Wiebel and Johann Friedrich Dieffenbach, who was the head of surgery at the Charité Hospital in Berlin.

According to authors at the time, Eichler's prostheses represented a significant development in movement for amputees, especially when compared to other designs and, in German-speaking countries, it served for a long time as a model and standard for designs to follow.

== Hand prosthesis ==
Eichler's artificial hand from 1836 is considered the first usable prosthesis of the upper extremity that could be moved without the assistance from the wearer's other, healthy hand. She built on progress made around 1812 by the Berlin dentist Peter Baliff for his design of a hand prosthesis.

Baliff had adapted the 1.5 kilograms (3.3 lb) "Iron Hand" of the feudal knight Götz von Berlichingen (also known as "Götz of the Iron Hand") and designed a new hand prosthesis, but it didn't get beyond the design phase. Its construction proved to be impractical and a prototype was never developed. One point of criticism for Baliff's hand, was that the fingers were designed to be actively opened but they relied on the force of springs to close, that is they passively closed, so the prosthesis lacked strength or could not adequately close. In addition, this prosthesis was made of heavy sheet iron and did not meet the wearers' practical anatomical or aesthetic needs.

Eichler's hand prosthesis, like the Baliff's, was operated by the remaining muscles in the upper arm stump using a pulling mechanism, but her mechanism differed significantly from his. The fingers were actively closed and stretched again by means of coil springs made of nickel silver wire, one in each finger joint. Gut strings with a diameter of about 1 mm were used for power transmission.

Structurally, the fingers featured three movable joints and the thumb had two joints. Digits could also be moved individually using five separate sliders on the wrist, but only passively. In contrast to the iron hands of Renaissance times, the prosthesis had an opposable thumb that enabled a forceps grip with a sixth slider.

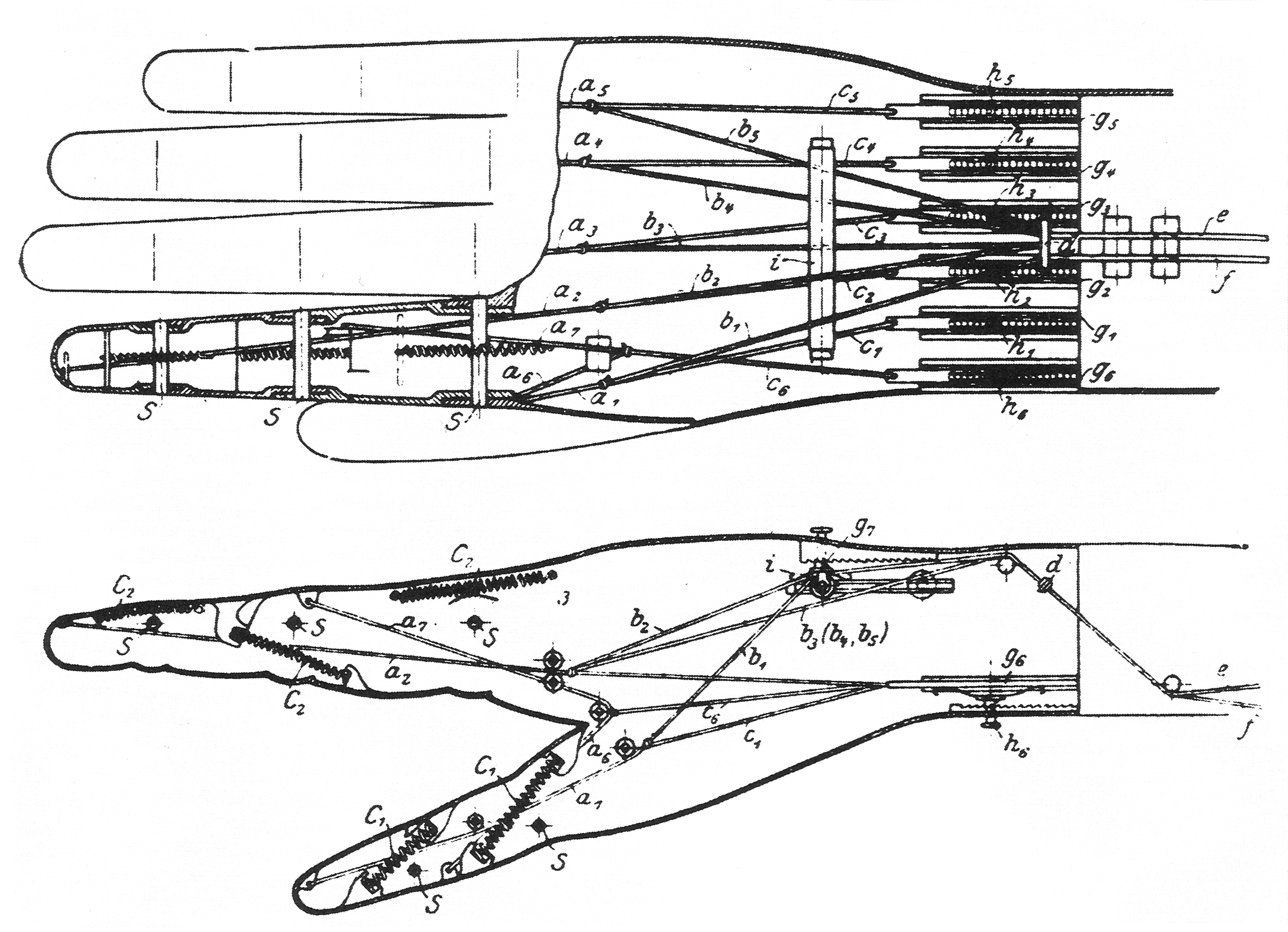
First usable body-powered artificial hand, developed by Caroline Eichler, patented in 1836.

Eichler's model also adopted design features from the Iron Hand: the wrist could bend at the wrist and a radial bearing made it possible to passively rotate the hand in relation to the forearm shaft (pronation or supination).

The hand prosthesis was formed from nickel silver sheet modeled after two plaster casts (one from the stump of the arm and one from the healthy hand) and weighed only about 125 grams (4.4 oz). The phalanxes were covered with cork on the inside to improve the grip. The wearer of the prosthesis would have been able to write, sew and embroider with it, and also be able to lift loads of up to 9 kilograms (20 lb). The hand could easily be dismantled into its individual parts to simplify repairs and keep costs down, but the purchase price was quite high at 75 to 100 thalers. The nickel silver used by Eichler remained the standard material for hand prostheses into the 20th century.
