= Guillemette du Luys =

French surgeon

Guillemette du Luys (fl. 1479), was a French surgeon in service of King Louis XI. She was one of two women to have served as royal physicians in France.

She is documented as a surgeon in service of the king in the year of 1479. She is described as in charge of the "lower stews" (estuver... par dessoubs), and may have been active as a phlebotomist. Her position was unusual for her sex. While there had been many female physicians in Paris in the 13th century, new laws in England, France and Spain from the mid-14th century had limited and restricted the existence of female medical practitioners, and Guillemette du Luys was reportedly the first female surgeon known in Paris since Peretta Peronne, who was tried for unlawful practice in the 1400s. She was furthermore the only contemporary female physician in France, except for Martinette, who was permitted to treat the poor of Dijon.

== See also ==
- Magistra Hersend
