= 1856 =

1856 in various calendars
- Gregorian calendar: 1856; MDCCCLVI
- Ab urbe condita: 2609
- Armenian calendar: 1305; ԹՎ ՌՅԵ
- Assyrian calendar: 6606
- Baháʼí calendar: 12–13
- Balinese saka calendar: 1777–1778
- Bengali calendar: 1262–1263
- Berber calendar: 2806
- British Regnal year: 19 Vict. 1 – 20 Vict. 1
- Buddhist calendar: 2400
- Burmese calendar: 1218
- Byzantine calendar: 7364–7365
- Chinese calendar: 乙卯年 (Wood Rabbit); 4553 or 4346 — to — 丙辰年 (Fire Dragon); 4554 or 4347
- Coptic calendar: 1572–1573
- Discordian calendar: 3022
- Ethiopian calendar: 1848–1849
- Hebrew calendar: 5616–5617
- Hindu calendars
- Vikram Samvat: 1912–1913
- Shaka Samvat: 1777–1778
- Kali Yuga: 4956–4957
- Holocene calendar: 11856
- Igbo calendar: 856–857
- Iranian calendar: 1234–1235
- Islamic calendar: 1272–1273
- Japanese calendar: Ansei 3 (安政３年)
- Javanese calendar: 1784–1785
- Julian calendar: Gregorian minus 12 days
- Korean calendar: 4189
- Minguo calendar: 56 before ROC 民前56年
- Nanakshahi calendar: 388
- Thai solar calendar: 2398–2399
- Tibetan calendar: ཤིང་མོ་ཡོས་ལོ་ (female Wood-Hare); 1982 or 1601 or 829 — to — མེ་ཕོ་འབྲུག་ལོ་ (male Fire-Dragon); 1983 or 1602 or 830

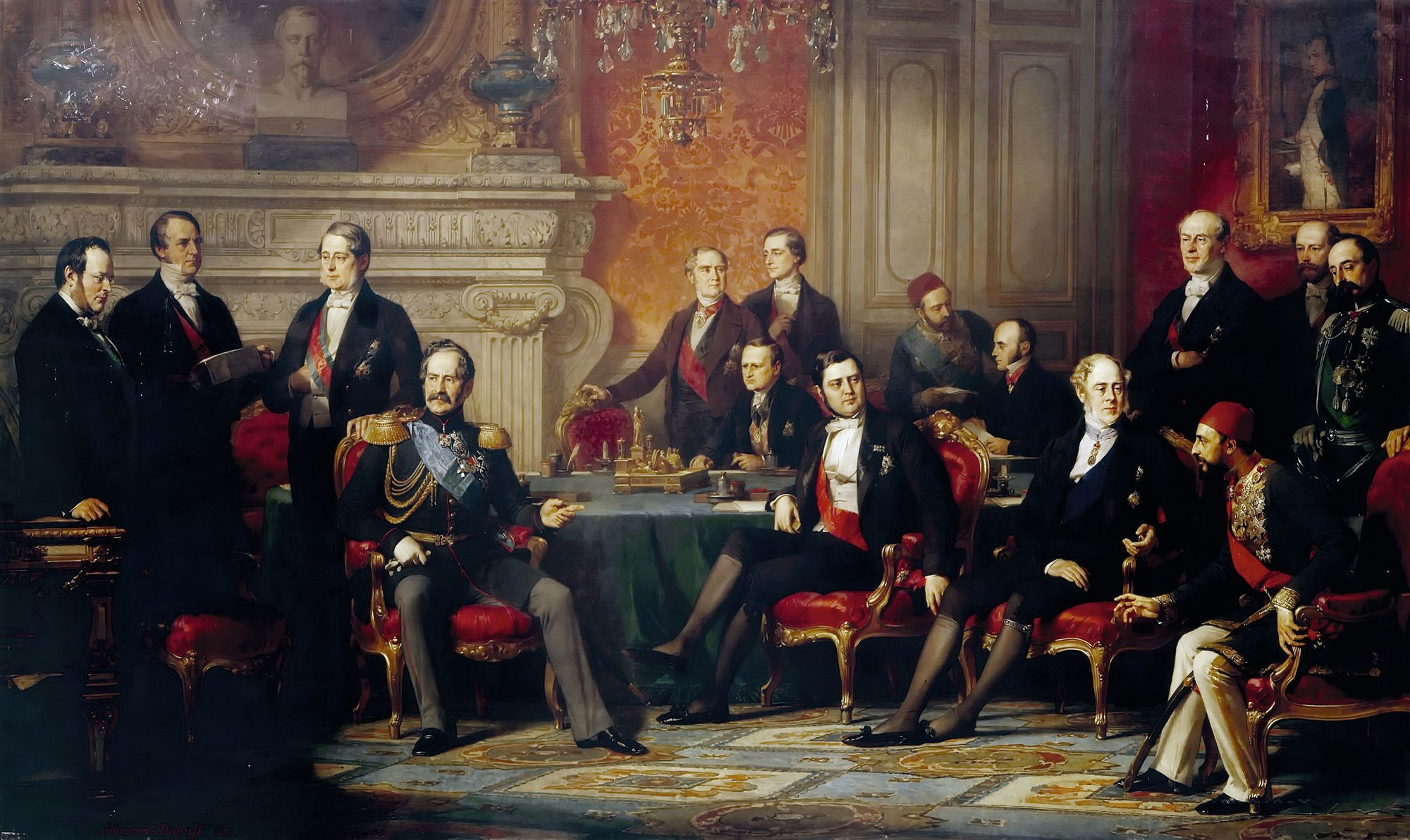
March 30: The Congress of Paris by Édouard Dubufe. The Treaty of Paris is signed, ending the Crimean War.

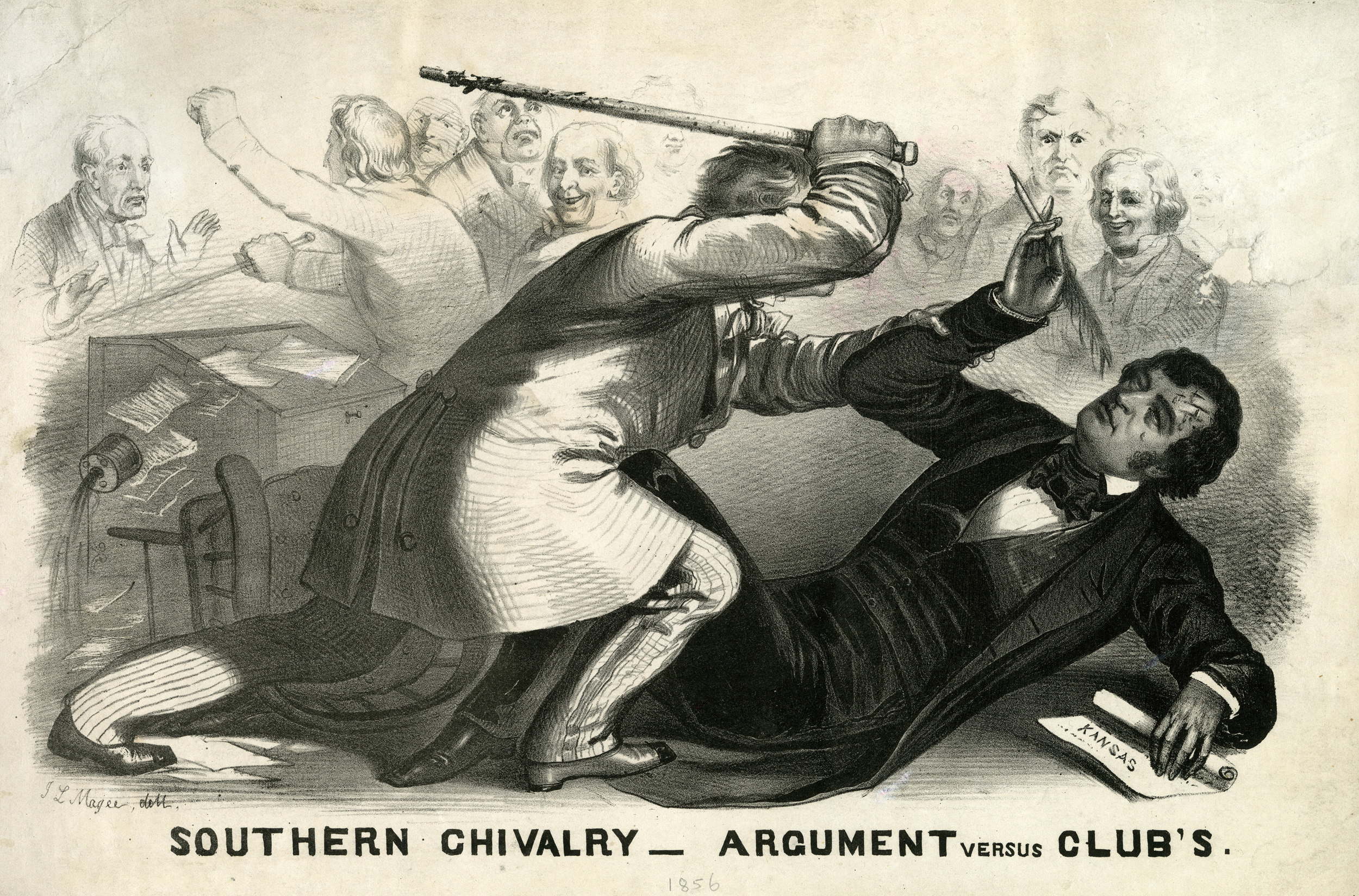
May 22: Senator Charles Sumner is seriously injured by Congressman Preston Brooks on the floor of the U.S. Senate

1856 (MDCCCLVI) was a leap year starting on Tuesday of the Gregorian calendar and a leap year starting on Sunday of the Julian calendar, the 1856th year of the Common Era (CE) and Anno Domini (AD) designations, the 856th year of the 2nd millennium, the 56th year of the 19th century, and the 7th year of the 1850s decade. As of the start of 1856, the Gregorian calendar was 12 days ahead of the Julian calendar, which remained in localized use until 1923.

== Events ==
=== January–March ===
- January 8 – Borax deposits are discovered in large quantities by John Veatch in California.
- January 23 – The American sidewheel steamer SS Pacific leaves Liverpool (England) for a transatlantic voyage on which she will be lost with all 186 on board.
- January 24 – U.S. President Franklin Pierce declares the new Free-State Topeka government in "Bleeding Kansas" to be in rebellion.
- January 26 – First Battle of Seattle: Marines from the USS Decatur suppress an indigenous uprising, in response to Governor Stevens' declaration of a "war of extermination" on Native communities.
- January 29
  - The 223-mile North Carolina Railroad is completed from Goldsboro through Raleigh and Salisbury to Charlotte.
  - Queen Victoria institutes the Victoria Cross as a British military decoration.
- February
  - The Tintic War breaks out in Utah.
  - The National Dress Reform Association is founded in the United States to promote "rational" dress for women.
- February 1 – Auburn University is first chartered, as the East Alabama Male College.
- February 2 – Dallas, Texas, is incorporated as a city.
- February 7 – The Nawab of Oudh, Wajid Ali Shah, is exiled to Metiabruz and the state is annexed by the British East India Company.
- February 12 – American clipper ships Driver and Ocean Queen leave Liverpool and London respectively; both will be lost without trace in the Atlantic, perhaps due to ice, killing 374 and 123 respectively.
- February 18 – The American Know Nothing Party convenes in Philadelphia to nominate their first Presidential candidate, former President Millard Fillmore.
- February 20 – American packet ship John Rutledge strikes an iceberg between 9:00 and 10:00 a.m. and sinks a few hours later. All five lifeboats are lowered but four are lost and never seen again. Out of roughly 150 passengers and crew aboard, only one person, Thomas W. Nye, survived and was rescued by the ship Germania.
- March
  - The Great Trigonometrical Survey of India officially gives 'Peak XV' (later to be named Mount Everest) the height of 29,002 ft (8,840 m). 'Peak IX' (Kangchenjunga), previously thought to be the world's highest, is confirmed as 28,156 ft (8,582 m).
  - Mauveine, the first synthetic organic dye, is discovered by William Henry Perkin, while attempting to synthesize quinine. This eventually leads to the birth of the chemical industry.
- March – Nepalese–Tibetan War: The signing of the Treaty of Thapathali concludes the war.
- March 5 – Fire destroys the Covent Garden Theatre in London.
- March 6 – Maryland Agricultural College (modern-day University of Maryland, College Park) is chartered.
- March 20 – Filibuster War: Battle of Santa Rosa: – Costa Rican troops rout Walker's soldiers.
- March 24 – Taiping Rebellion: Suspecting treachery on the part of East King Yang Xiuqing, Shi Dakai garrisons Anhui and begins his march back to the Heavenly Capital, having defeated a strong Xiang Army detachment.
- March 30 – The Treaty of Paris is signed, ending the Crimean War.

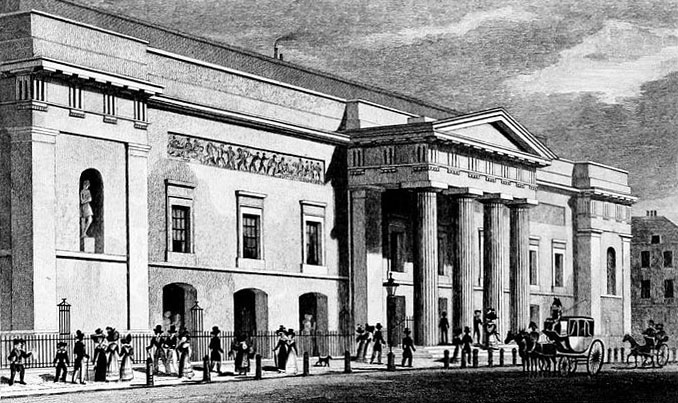
March 5: Covent Garden Theatre fire.

=== April–June ===
- April – The Xhosa cattle-killing movement and famine begins in Cape Colony.
- April 7 – Nelson College is founded in Nelson, New Zealand.
- April 10 – Theta Chi international college fraternity is founded at Norwich University in Vermont.
- April 16 – The Paris Declaration Respecting Maritime Law abolishes privateering, and regulates the relationship between neutral and belligerent shipping on the high seas.
- April 17 – The Chicago Historical Society Museum is established at 1601 N. Clark Street, Chicago.
- April 21 – Building workers agitate for the eight-hour day in Melbourne, Australia.
- April 29 – The iron-hulled paddle steamer RMS Persia concludes a 9-day 16 hour westbound transatlantic crossing, at an average 13.11 knots (24.28 km/h), regaining the Blue Riband for the Cunard Line.
- April 30 - The founding of the Associação Naval de Lisboa by King Pedro V, the oldest nautical association in the Iberian Peninsula.
- May 1 – The province of Isabela is created in the Philippines, in honor of Queen Isabella II of Spain.
- May 3 – Queen Victoria of the United Kingdom gives Norfolk Island to the population of the colony at Pitcairn Island, most being descendants of the Mutiny on the Bounty. They first settle on Norfolk Island on June 8. Women's suffrage, as practiced on Pitcairn, is extended to Norfolk Island.
- May 14 – The San Francisco Committee of Vigilance is founded in the United States. It lynches two gangsters, arrests most Democratic Party officials, and disbands itself on August 18.
- May 20 – David Livingstone arrives at Quelimane on the Indian Ocean, having completed a 2-year transcontinental journey across Africa from Luanda.
- May 21 – Sacking of Lawrence: Lawrence, Kansas, is captured and burned by pro-slavery forces.
- May 22 – Caning of Charles Sumner: United States Congressman Preston Brooks of South Carolina beats Senator Charles Sumner with a cane in the hall of the United States Senate for a speech Sumner had made attacking pro-slavery Southerners, especially elderly South Carolina Senator Andrew Butler, a relative of Brooks. Sumner is unable to return to duty for three years while he recovers; Brooks becomes a hero across the South.
- May 24 – Pottawatomie massacre: A group of followers of radical abolitionist John Brown kill 5 homesteaders in Franklin County, Kansas.
- June 2 – Battle of Black Jack: Antislavery forces, led by John Brown, defeat proslavery forces in Bleeding Kansas.
- June 9 – 500 Mormon handcart pioneers leave Iowa City and head west for Salt Lake City, Utah, carrying all their possessions in two-wheeled handcarts.
- June 13 – Taiping Rebellion: Shi Dakai arrives at Nanjing.
- June 20 – General Mills is founded in Minneapolis, Minnesota, United States, as the Minneapolis Milling Company.

=== July–September ===
- July 9 – Natal becomes a British Crown colony.
- July 14–15 – In Spain, General Leopoldo O'Donnell takes control of the government, bringing an end to the bienio progresista.
- July 17 – The Great Train Wreck (the worst railroad calamity in the world to date) occurs near Philadelphia, Pennsylvania, United States.
- July 31 – Christchurch, New Zealand, is chartered as a city.
- August – Pre-human remains are found in the Neanderthal Valley in Prussia.
- August 10 – The Last Island hurricane destroys Last Island, Louisiana, leaving 400 dead. The whole island is broken up into several smaller islands by the storm.
- August 30 – Battle of Osawatomie: Proslavery forces defeat antislavery forces in Bleeding Kansas.
- September 1 – Seton Hall University is founded in South Orange, New Jersey, by the first bishop of the Diocese of Newark, James Roosevelt Bayley, a cousin of future U.S. President Theodore Roosevelt and nephew of the first American-born Catholic saint, Saint Elizabeth Ann Seton. Seton Hall University is the oldest and largest Catholic diocesan university in the United States and the first institution named in honor of St. Elizabeth Ann Seton.
- September 2 – Taiping Rebellion: Wei Changhui and Qin Rigang assassinate Yang Xiuqing.
- September 7 – The Saimaa Canal was inaugurated.

=== October–December ===
- October 8 – The Second Opium War between several Western powers and China begins with the Arrow Incident on the Pearl River.
- October 12 – 1856 Heraklion earthquake: A powerful earthquake rocks the Mediterranean, killing hundreds on the island of Crete and many more in the Middle East.
- October 13 – American mercenary William Walker effectively takes control of Nicaragua.
- November 1 – Anglo-Persian War: War is declared between Great Britain and Persia.
- November 4 – 1856 United States presidential election: Democrat James Buchanan defeats former President Millard Fillmore, representing a coalition of Know Nothings and Whigs, and John C. Frémont of the fledgling Republican Party, to become the 15th President of the United States.
- November 11 – Taiping Rebellion: Shi Dakai arrives at the Heavenly Capital once more with 100,000 men, and demands that Wei Changhui and Qin Rigang be executed. Shi subsequently becomes head of the government.
- November 17 – American Old West: On the Sonoita River in modern-day southern Arizona, the United States Army establishes Fort Buchanan, in order to help control new land acquired in the Gadsden Purchase.
- November 21 – Niagara University is founded in Niagara Falls, New York.
- November 27 – The Coup of 1856 leads to Luxembourg's unilateral adoption of a new, reactionary constitution, as King-Grand Duke William III signs the new constitution without the Chamber of Deputies' consent.
- December 1 – Under the County and Borough Police Act, in any county or area of England and Wales where a police force has not already been established, the Justices of the Peace must from this date take steps to create one according to nationally defined standards.
- December 2 – The National Portrait Gallery, London, is established.
- December 9 – Bushehr surrenders to the British.

=== Date unknown ===
- Gregor Mendel starts his research on genetics.
- Kate Warne, the first female private detective, begins to work for the Pinkerton Detective Agency.
- Legal protection of widow remarriage is extended in India.
- St. Paul's School, Belgaum, is founded by the Jesuits in Belgaum, India.
- The British Guiana 1c magenta postage stamp is issued in British Guiana in limited numbers; the one surviving specimen will become regarded as the world's rarest stamp.
- Global financial services business Credit Suisse is founded as La Schweizerische Kreditanstalt.
- Charles III of Monaco grants a concession to Napoléon Langlois and Albert Aubert to establish a German-style casino at Monte Carlo.

== Births ==
=== January–March ===
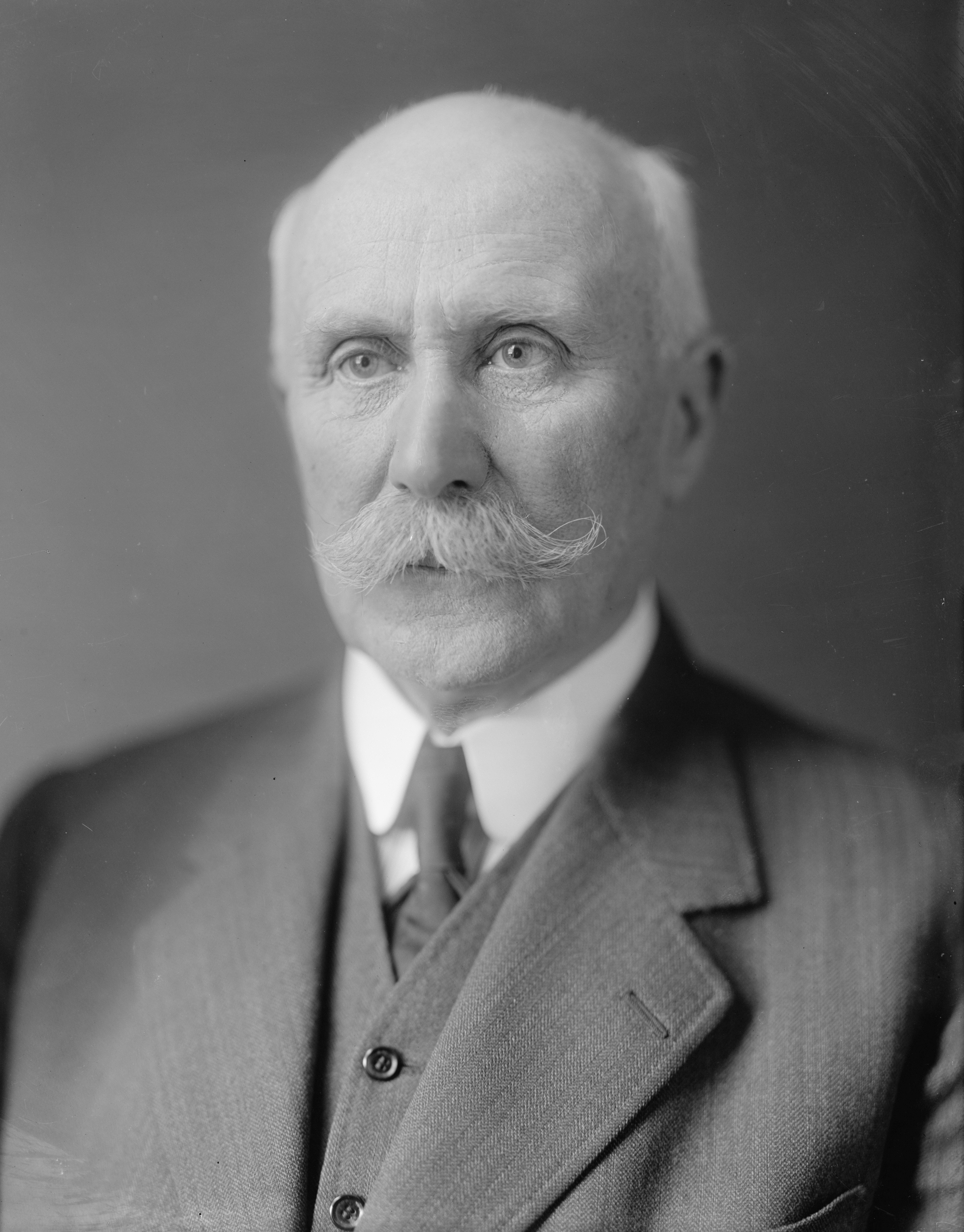
Henri Philippe Pétain

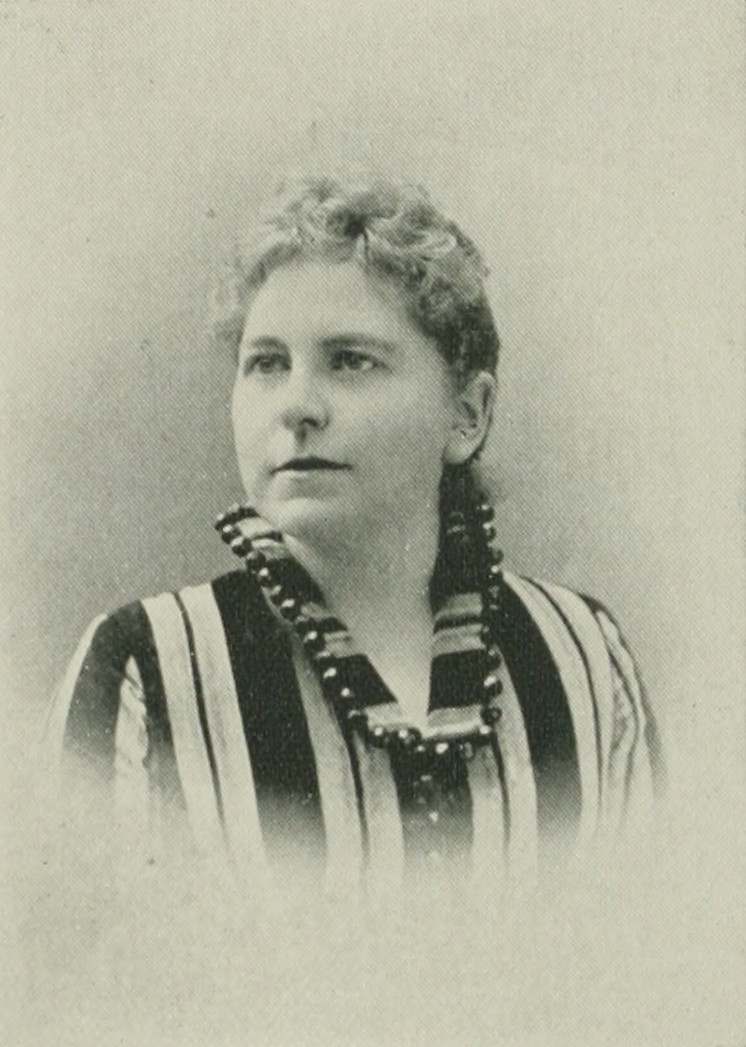
Elizabeth Marney Conner

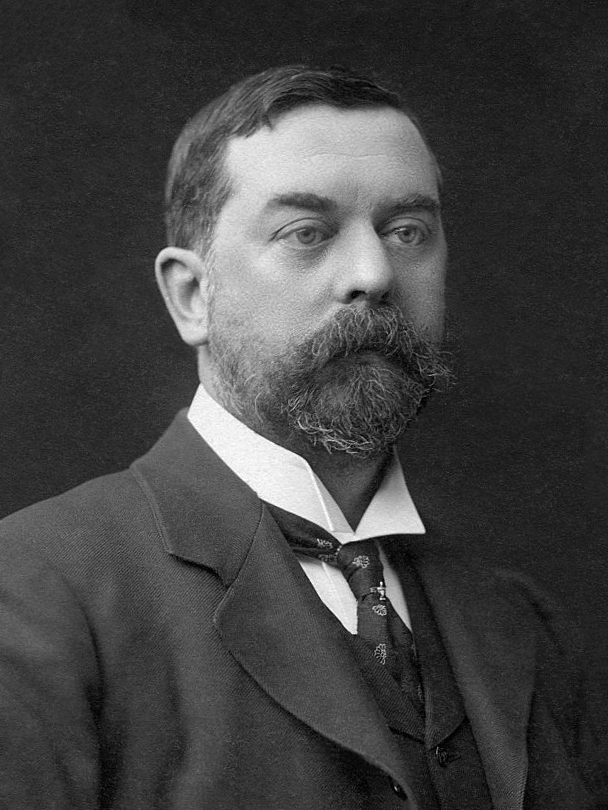
John Singer Sargent

- January 6 – Martin von Feuerstein, German painter (d. 1931)
- January 7 – Evald Relander, Finnish teacher, agronomist and banker (d. 1926)
- January 9 – Lizette Woodworth Reese, American poet and teacher (d. 1935)
- January 11 – Christian Sinding, Norwegian composer (d. 1941)
- January 12 – John Singer Sargent, American artist (d. 1925)
- January 27 – Telémaco Susini, Argentinian physician (d. 1936)
- January 31 – Hermann von François, German general (d. 1933)
- February 2 – Frederick William Vanderbilt, American railway magnate (d. 1938)
- February 4 – Otani Kikuzo, Japanese general (d. 1923)
- February 5 – Frank Podmore, British psychical researcher (d. 1910)
- February 9 – Hara Takashi, Japanese politician, 10th Prime Minister of Japan (d. 1921)
- February 10 – Fredericus van Rossum du Chattel, Dutch painter (d. 1917)
- February 12 – Eduard von Böhm-Ermolli, Austrian general, German field marshal (d. 1941)
- February 14 – Frank Harris, Irish author, editor (d. 1931)
- February 15 – Emil Kraepelin, German psychiatrist (d. 1926)
- February 17 – Arnold von Winckler, German general (d. 1945)
- February 21
  - Paul Puhallo von Brlog, Croatian Austro-Hungarian general (d. 1926)
  - Maurycy Gottlieb, Ukrainian painter (d. 1879)
- February 26 – Elizabeth Marney Conner, American elocutionist (unknown year of death)
- March 2 – Louis Dartige du Fournet, French admiral (d. 1940)
- March 4
  - Julius Drewe, English businessman, retailer and entrepreneur (d. 1931)
  - Alfred William Rich, English watercolour painter, author (d. 1921)
- March 8
  - Bramwell Booth, English Salvation Army general (d. 1929)
  - Tom Roberts, Australian artist (d. 1931)
- March 9
  - Eddie Foy Sr., American vaudevillian (d. 1928)
  - Jules-Albert de Dion, French automobile pioneer (d. 1946)
- March 16 – Napoléon, Prince Imperial of France (k. 1879)
- March 20
  - Sir John Lavery, Irish artist (d. 1941)
  - Frederick Winslow Taylor, American inventor and efficiency expert (d. 1915)
- March 26 – William Massey, Irish-born 19th Prime Minister of New Zealand (d. 1925)

=== April–June ===
- April 4 – Washington Irving Chambers, American naval officer (d. 1934)
- April 5 – Booker T. Washington, American educator (d. 1915)
- April 6 – Maurice Sarrail, French general (d. 1929)
- April 12 – Martin Conway, British art critic, mountaineer (d. 1937)
- April 14 – Albert W. Grant, American admiral (d. 1930)
- April 18 – Hammerton Killick, Haitian admiral (d. 1902)
- April 23 – Granville Woods, African-American inventor (d. 1910)
- April 24 – Philippe Pétain, French soldier, statesman (d. 1951)
- April 26 – Sir Joseph Ward, 17th Prime Minister of New Zealand (d. 1930)
- April 27 – Tongzhi Emperor of China (d. 1875)
- May 6
  - Sigmund Freud, Austrian neurologist (d. 1939)
  - Robert Peary, American Arctic explorer (d. 1920)
- May 8 – Pedro Lascuráin, 34th President of Mexico (d. 1952)
- May 15 – L. Frank Baum, American author, poet, playwright, actor and independent filmmaker (The Wizard of Oz) (d. 1919)
- May 18 – Guglielmo Pecori Giraldi, Italian nobleman, general and politician (d. 1941)
- May 21 – José Batlle y Ordóñez, Twice President of Uruguay (d. 1929)
- May 25
  - Ján Bahýľ, Slovak engineer, inventor (d. 1916)
  - Louis Franchet d'Espèrey, French general (d. 1942)
- June 14 – Andrey Markov, Russian mathematician (d. 1922)
- June 22 – H. Rider Haggard, English novelist (d. 1925)
- June 29 – Maria Cederschiöld, Swedish journalist (d. 1935)

=== July–September ===
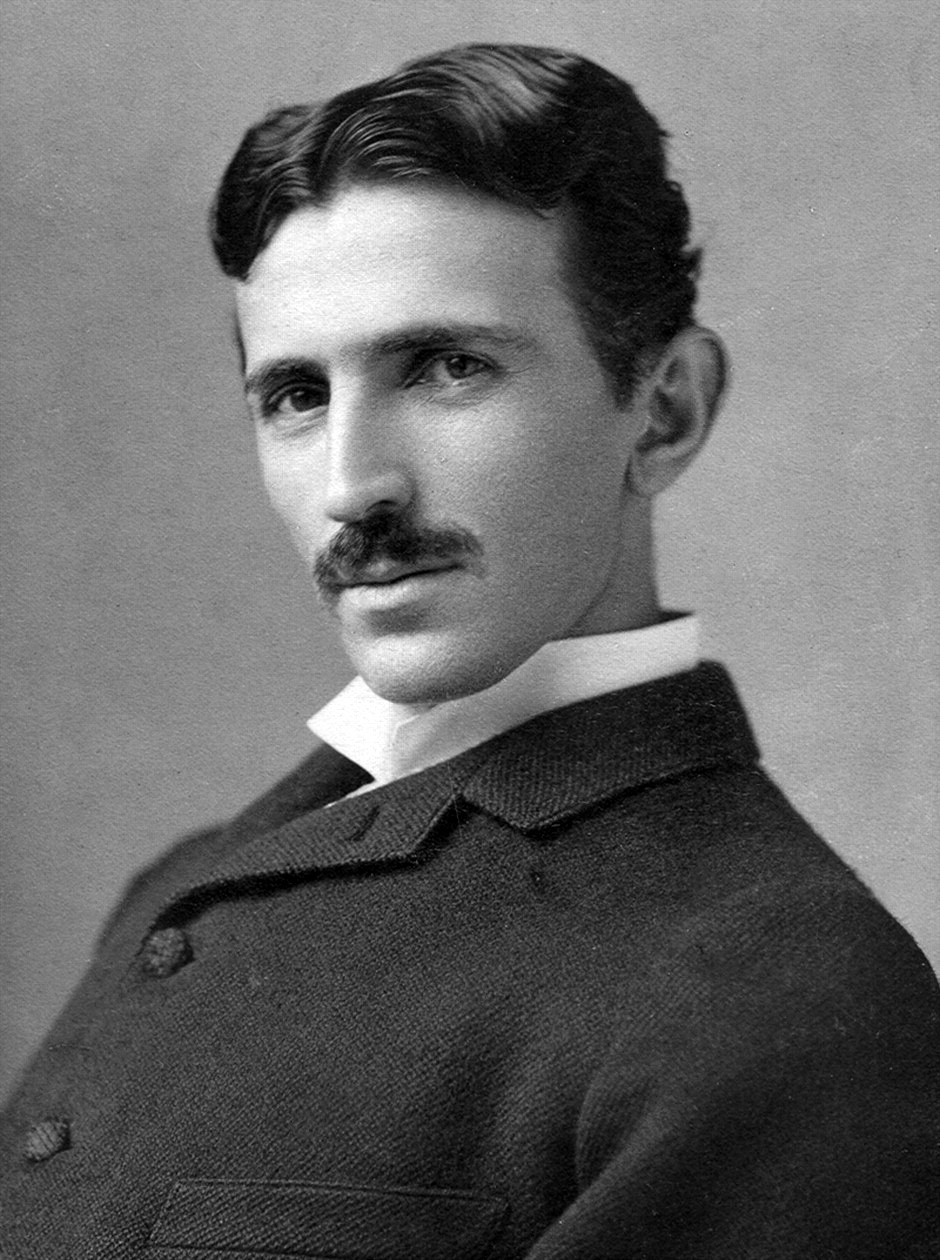
Nikola Tesla

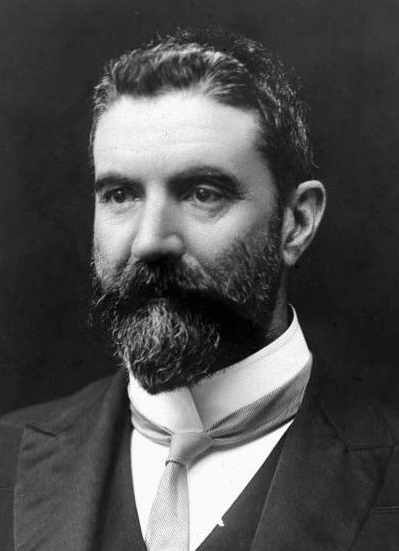
Alfred Deakin

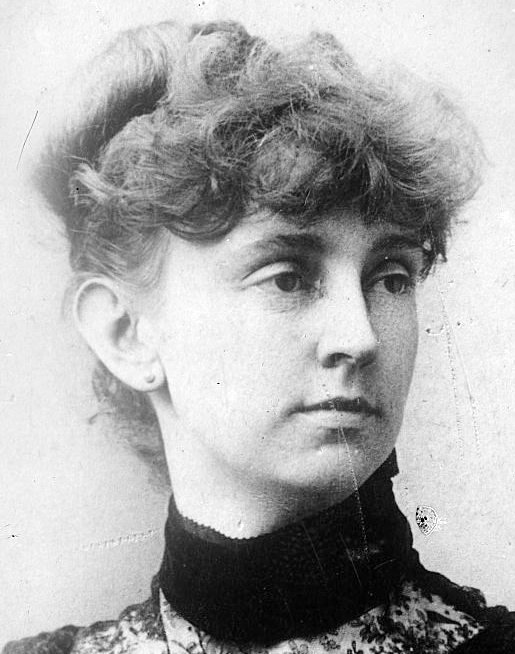
Kate Douglas Wiggin

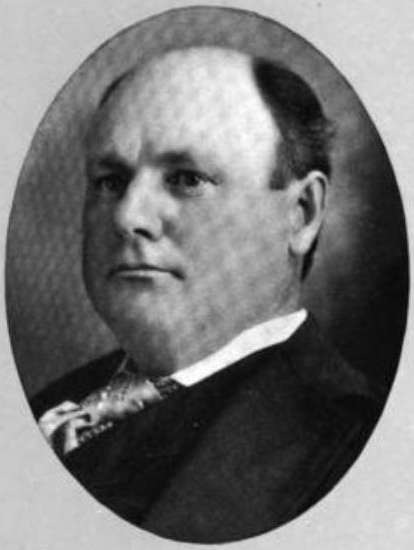
George McClellan

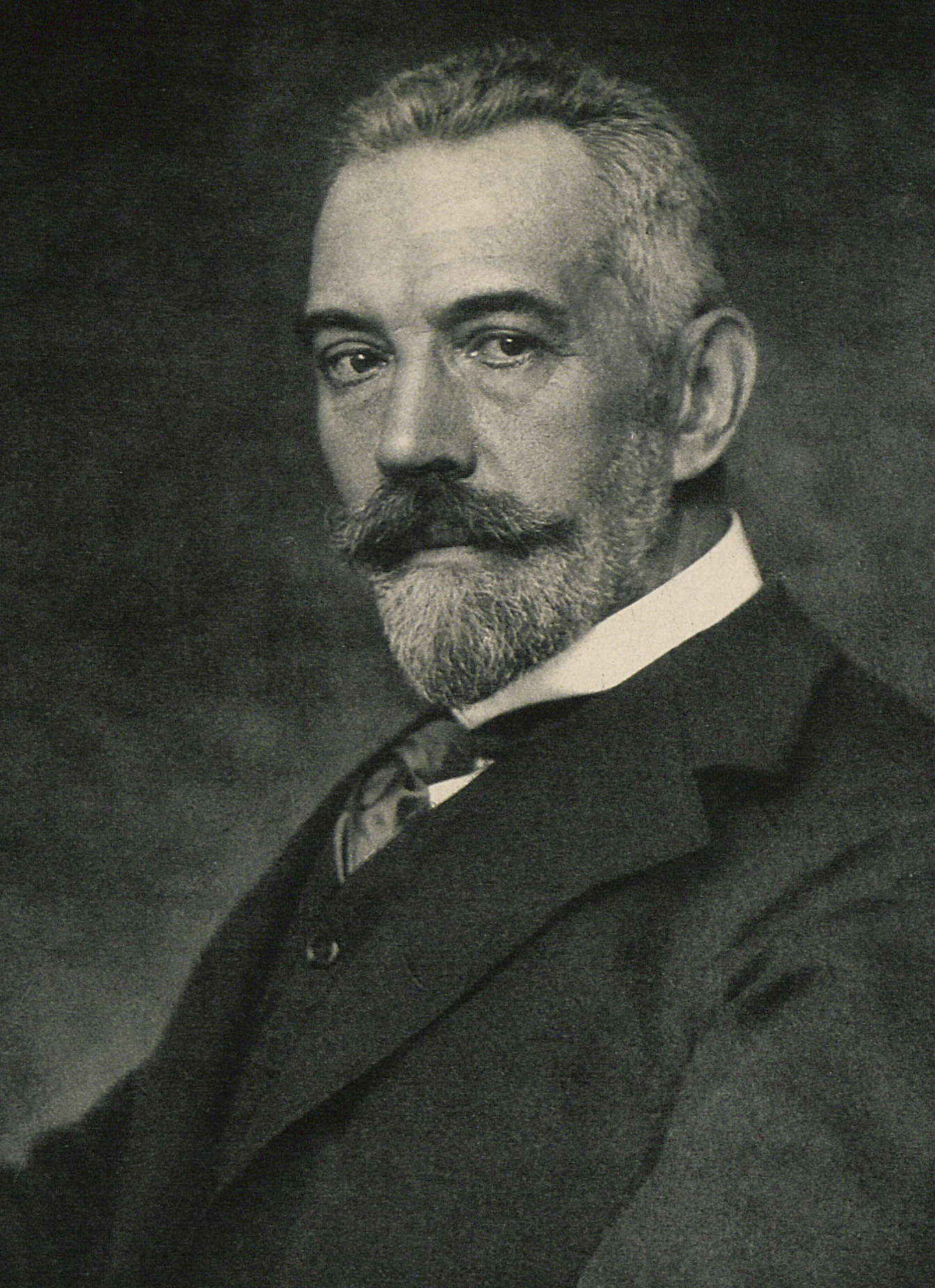
Theobald von Bethmann Hollweg

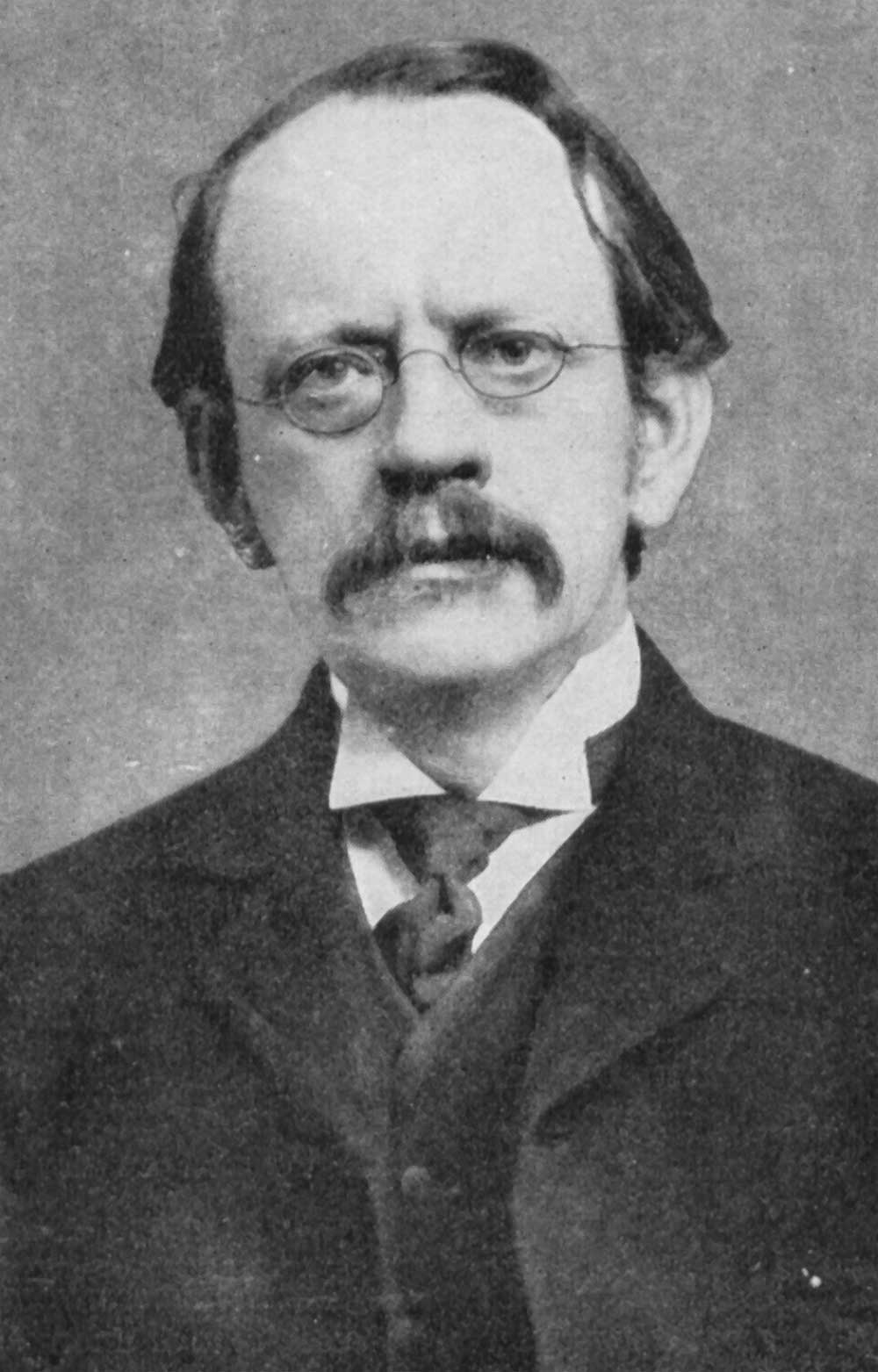
J. J. Thomson

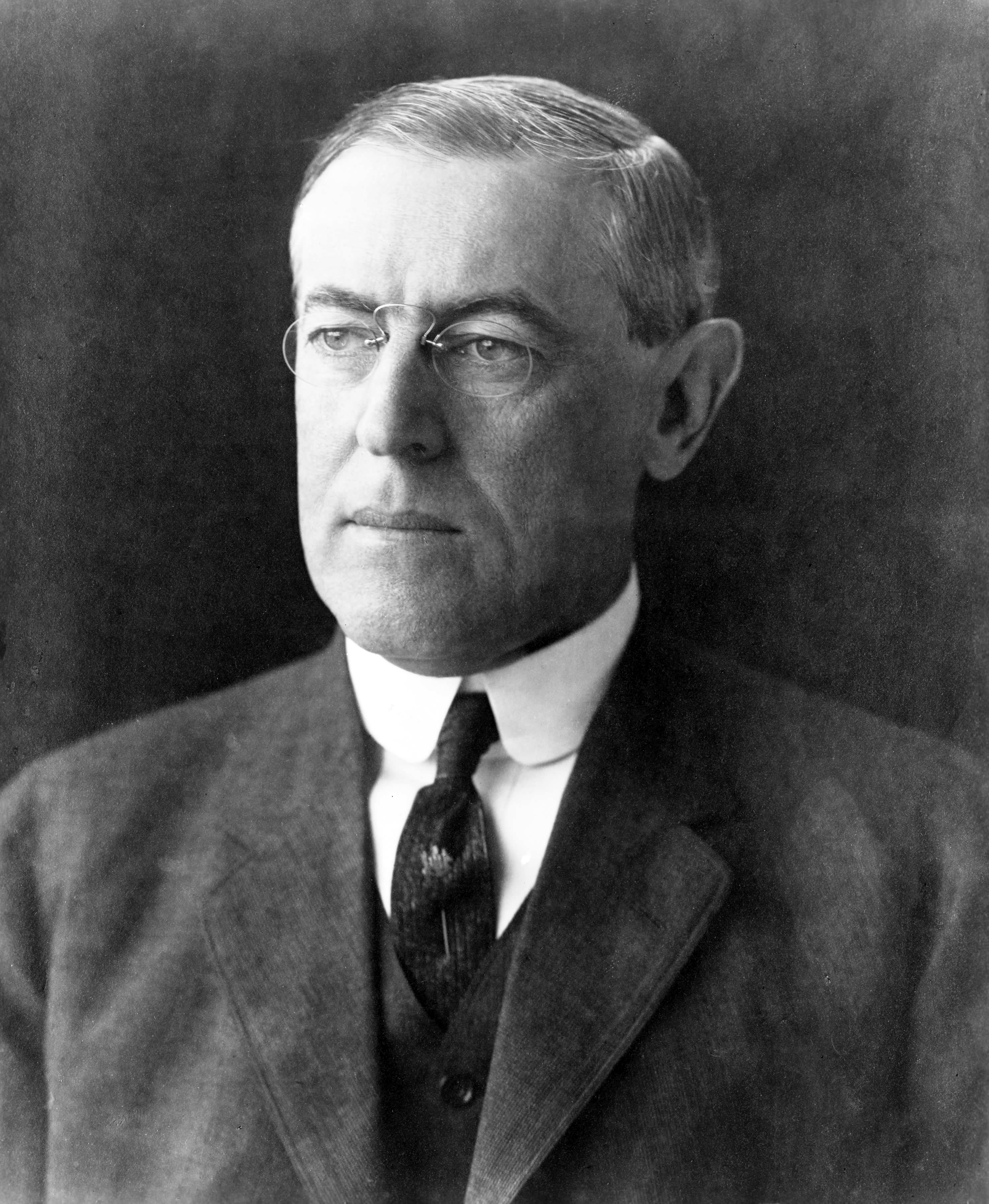
Woodrow Wilson

- July 7 – Georg von der Marwitz, German general (d. 1929)
- July 10 – Nikola Tesla, Serbian-American inventor (d. 1943)
- July 11 – Georgiana Drew, American stage actress, married Maurice Barrymore in 1876 (d. 1893)
- July 23 – Bal Gangadhar Tilak, Indian political activist (d. 1920)
- July 24 – Franklin Ware Mann, American inventor (d. 1916)
- July 26 – George Bernard Shaw, Irish writer, Nobel Prize laureate (d. 1950)
- July 27 – Nathan Francis Mossell, physician, 1st African American graduate of the University of Pennsylvania School of Medicine and founder of the Frederick Douglass Memorial Hospital and Training School (d. 1946)
- July 30 – Harriet Bates, American author (d. 1886)
- August 3 – Alfred Deakin, 2nd Prime Minister of Australia (d. 1919)
- August 10 – William Willett, British promoter of Daylight Saving Time (d. 1915)
- August 12 – Diamond Jim Brady, American businessman and philanthropist (d. 1917)
- August 15
  - Ivan Franko, Ukrainian poet, critic, journalist and political activist (d. 1916)
  - Keir Hardie, British labour leader (d. 1915)
- September 1 – Sergei Winogradsky, Russian scientist (d. 1953)
- September 3 – Louis Sullivan, American architect (d. 1924)
- September 18 – Wilhelm von Gloeden, German photographer (d. 1931)
- September 19 – Miguel R. Dávila, Honduranian general, 21st President of Honduras (d. 1927)
- September 28 – Kate Douglas Wiggin, American author of Rebecca of Sunnybrook Farm (d. 1923)

=== October–December ===
- October 15 – Robert Nivelle, French general (d. 1924)
- October 21 – Francisco Plancarte y Navarrete, Mexican archaeologist and Archbishop of Roman Catholic Archdiocese of Monterrey (d. June 2, 1920)
- October 23 – William Thomas Turner, British ship's captain with Cunard Steamship Company (d. 1933)
- October 30 – Charles Leroux, American balloonist, parachutist (d. 1889)
- November 2 – Hermann von Kuhl, Prussian-born German general (d. 1958)
- November 9 – Andrei Eberhardt, Russian admiral (d. 1919)
- November 13 – Louis Brandeis, Associate Justice of the Supreme Court of the United States (d. 1941)
- November 14 – J. M. Robertson, British Liberal Party politician, writer and journalist, Parliamentary Secretary to the Board of Trade (d. 1933)
- November 17 – Demetrio Castillo Duany, Cuban revolutionary, soldier and politician (d. 1922)
- November 21 – William Emerson Ritter, American biologist (d. 1944)
- November 22
  - Heber J. Grant, 7th president of The Church of Jesus Christ of Latter-day Saints (d. 1945)
  - Melbourne MacDowell, American stage and film actor (d. 1941)
- November 24 – Bat Masterson, American lawman (d. 1921)
- November 28 – Mary Catherine Crowley, American author (d. 1920)
- November 29 – Theobald von Bethmann Hollweg, Chancellor of Germany (d. 1921)
- December 2 – Robert Kajanus, Finnish conductor, composer (d. 1933)
- December 6 – Hans Molisch, Czech-Austrian botanist (d. 1937)
- December 10 – Dewa Shigetō, Japanese admiral (d. 1930)
- December 11 – Georgi Plekhanov, Russian revolutionary, Marxist theoretician (d. 1918)
- December 13 – Svetozar Boroević, Austrian field marshal (d. 1920)
- December 18
  - Graciano López Jaena, Filipino journalist, writer and patriot (d. 1896)
  - J. J. Thomson, English physicist, Nobel Prize laureate (d. 1940)
- December 22 – Frank B. Kellogg, United States Secretary of State, recipient of the Nobel Peace Prize (d. 1937)
- December 23 – James Buchanan Duke, American tobacco and electric power industrialist (d. 1925)
- December 25 – Hans von Bartels, German painter (d. 1913)
- December 28 – Woodrow Wilson, 28th President of the United States, recipient of the Nobel Peace Prize (d. 1924)

=== Date unknown ===
- Zübeyde Hanım, mother of Mustafa Kemal Atatürk (d. 1923)
- Juan Nepomuceno Rencoret, Chilean doctor (d. ?)
- John Mushmouth Johnson, American gambling king (d. 1907)

== Deaths ==
=== January–June ===
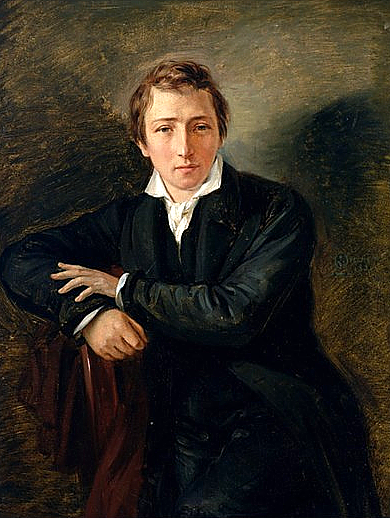
Heinrich Heine

- January 4 – Charles Brudenell-Bruce, 1st Marquess of Ailesbury, British politician (b. 1773)
- January 14 – Janko Drašković, Croatian politician, reformer (b. 1770)
- January 16 – Thaddeus William Harris, American naturalist (b. 1795)
- January 31 – Khedrup Gyatso, 11th Dalai Lama (b. 1838)
- February 4 – Anna Gottlieb, Austrian operatic soprano (b. 1774)
- February 17 – Heinrich Heine, German writer (b. 1797)
- May 3
  - Adolphe Charles Adam, French composer (b. 1803)
  - Louis-Étienne Saint-Denis, Arab-French memoir writer and servant to Napoleon I (b. 1788)
- June 23 – Ivan Kireyevsky, Russian literary critic, philosopher (b. 1806)
- June 26 – Max Stirner, German philosopher (b. 1806)

=== July–December ===
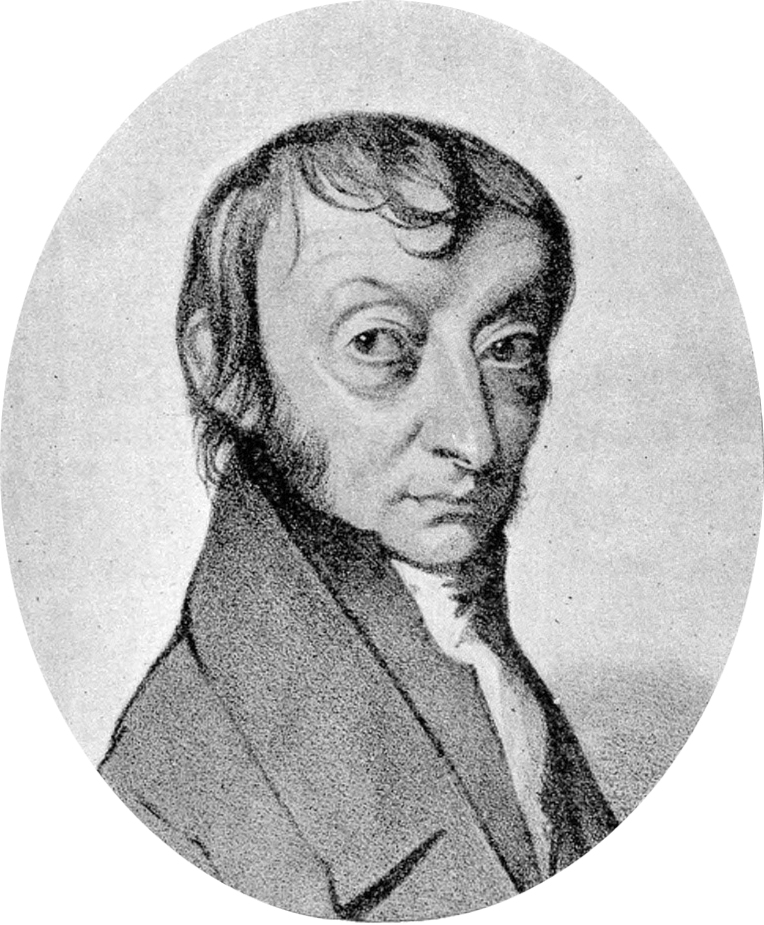
Amedeo Avogadro

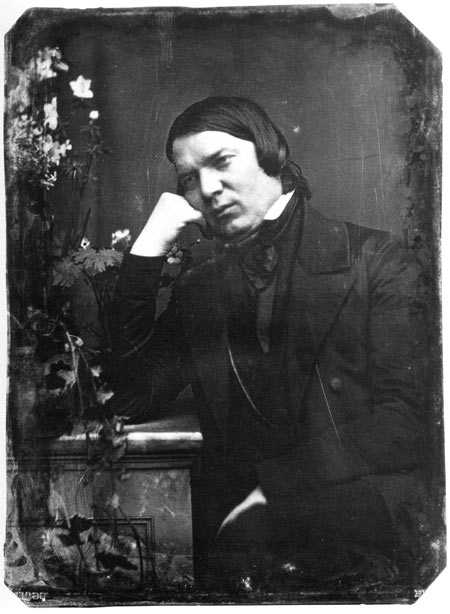
Robert Schumann

- July 9 – Amedeo Avogadro, Italian chemist (b. 1776)
- July 11 – Norberto Ramírez, Central American politician
- July 14 – Edward Vernon Utterson, English lawyer, literary antiquary, collector and editor (b. 1775/1776)
- July 20 – Anna Nielsen, Danish mezzo-soprano (b. 1803)
- July 29
  - Karel Havlíček Borovský, Czech politician, writer (b. 1821)
  - Robert Schumann, German composer, pianist (b. 1810)
- August 6 – Robert Lucas de Pearsall, English composer; setting of "In dulce jubilo" (b. 1795)
- August 14 – William Buckland, English geologist, palaeontologist (b. 1784)
- August 19 – Anna Maria Rüttimann-Meyer von Schauensee, politically active Swiss salonist (b. 1772)
- August 29 – Mary Anne Schimmelpenninck, British Christian writer (b. 1778)
- August 30 – Gilbert Abbott à Beckett, English writer (b. 1811)
- September 3 – Honório Hermeto Carneiro Leão, Marquis of Paraná, Brazilian politician (b. 1801)
- October 19
  - Josceline Percy, British admiral (b. 1784)
  - William Sprague III, American politician from Rhode Island (b. 1799)
  - Said bin Sultan, Sultan of Muscat and Oman (b. 1797)
- October 29 – Carel Sirardus Willem van Hogendorp, Acting Governor-General of Dutch East Indies (b. 1788)
- November 23 – Manuela Sáenz, Colombian national heroine (b. 1797)
- December 20 – Francesco Bentivegna, Italian revolutionary (b. 1820)

=== Date unknown ===
- Enriqueta Favez, Swiss physician, surgeon (b. 1791)
- Juana Ramírez, "La Avanzadora", Venezuelan heroine (b. 1790)
