= 1791 =

1791 in various calendars
- Gregorian calendar: 1791; MDCCXCI
- Ab urbe condita: 2544
- Armenian calendar: 1240; ԹՎ ՌՄԽ
- Assyrian calendar: 6541
- Balinese saka calendar: 1712–1713
- Bengali calendar: 1197–1198
- Berber calendar: 2741
- British Regnal year: 31 Geo. 3 – 32 Geo. 3
- Buddhist calendar: 2335
- Burmese calendar: 1153
- Byzantine calendar: 7299–7300
- Chinese calendar: 庚戌年 (Metal Dog); 4488 or 4281 — to — 辛亥年 (Metal Pig); 4489 or 4282
- Coptic calendar: 1507–1508
- Discordian calendar: 2957
- Ethiopian calendar: 1783–1784
- Hebrew calendar: 5551–5552
- Hindu calendars
- Vikram Samvat: 1847–1848
- Shaka Samvat: 1712–1713
- Kali Yuga: 4891–4892
- Holocene calendar: 11791
- Igbo calendar: 791–792
- Iranian calendar: 1169–1170
- Islamic calendar: 1205–1206
- Japanese calendar: Kansei 3 (寛政３年)
- Javanese calendar: 1717–1718
- Julian calendar: Gregorian minus 11 days
- Korean calendar: 4124
- Minguo calendar: 121 before ROC 民前121年
- Nanakshahi calendar: 323
- Thai solar calendar: 2333–2334
- Tibetan calendar: ལྕགས་ཕོ་ཁྱི་ལོ་ (male Iron-Dog); 1917 or 1536 or 764 — to — ལྕགས་མོ་ཕག་ལོ་ (female Iron-Boar); 1918 or 1537 or 765

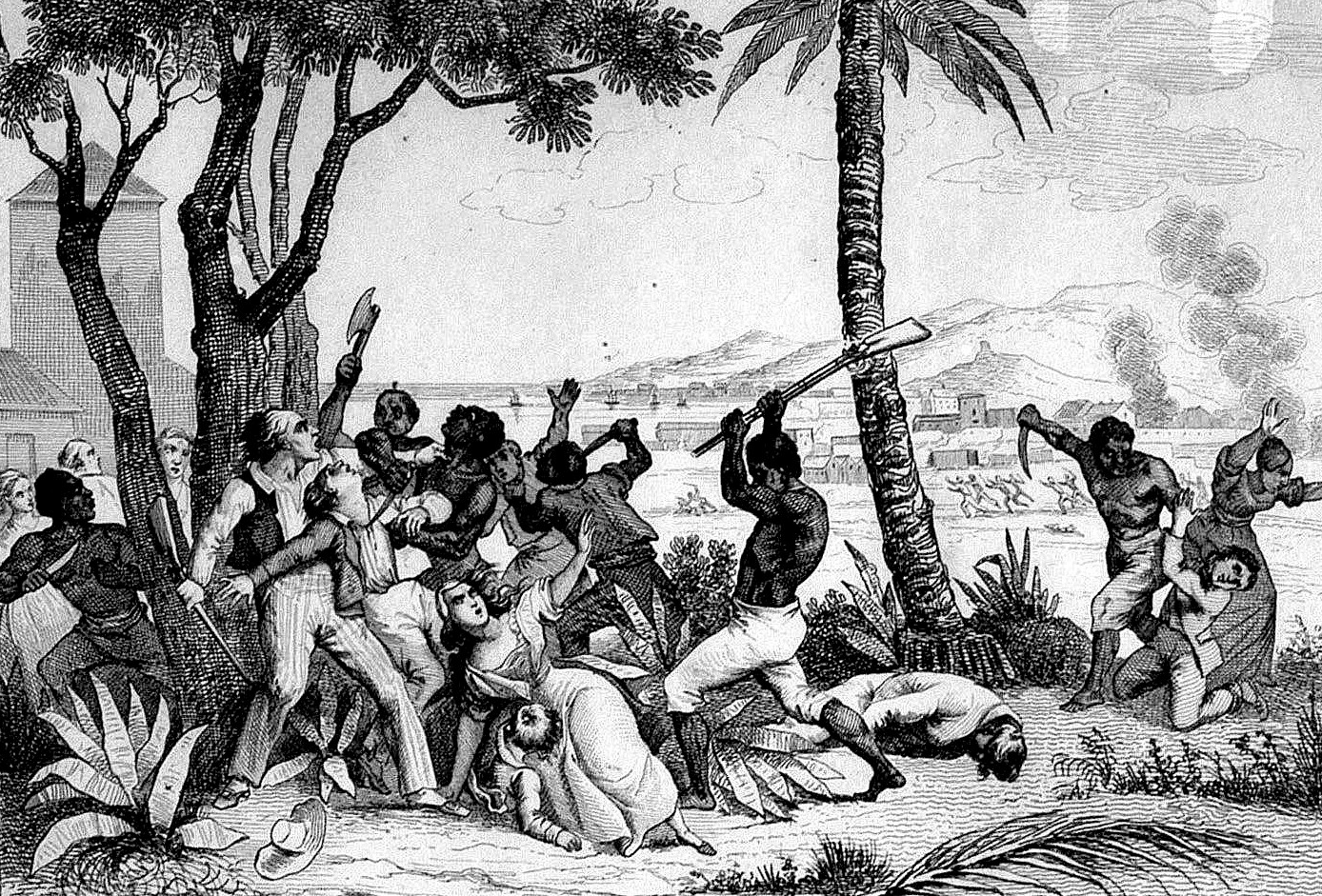
August 21: Black slaves begin uprising against white slave masters in Haitian Revolution.

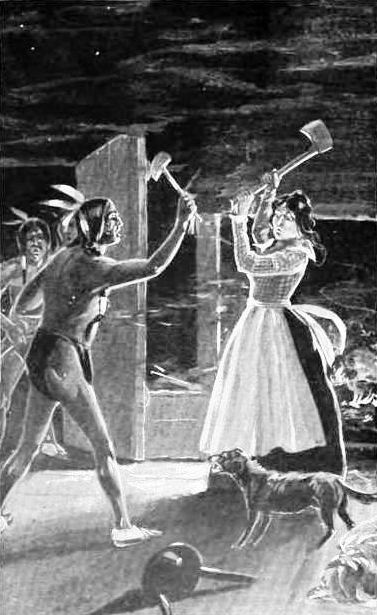
January 2: Big Bottom massacre

1791 (MDCCXCI) was a common year starting on Saturday of the Gregorian calendar and a common year starting on Wednesday of the Julian calendar, the 1791st year of the Common Era (CE) and Anno Domini (AD) designations, the 791st year of the 2nd millennium, the 91st year of the 18th century, and the 2nd year of the 1790s decade. As of the start of 1791, the Gregorian calendar was 11 days ahead of the Julian calendar, which remained in localized use until 1923.

== Events ==
=== January–March ===
- January 1 – Austrian composer Joseph Haydn arrives in England, to perform a series of concerts.
- January 2 – Northwest Indian War: Big Bottom Massacre – The war begins in the Ohio Country, with this massacre.
- January 12 – Holy Roman troops reenter Liège, heralding the end of the Liège Revolution, and the restoration of its Prince-Bishops.
- January 25 – The British Parliament passes the Constitutional Act 1791, splitting the old province of Quebec into Upper and Lower Canada.
- February 8 – The Bank of the United States, based in Philadelphia, is incorporated by the federal government with a 20-year charter and started with $10,000,000 capital.
- February 21 – The United States opens diplomatic relations with Portugal.
- March 2 – French Revolution:
  - The abolition of guilds is enacted.
  - A mechanical semaphore line for rapid long-distance communication is demonstrated by Claude Chappe in Paris.
- March 4 – Vermont is admitted as the 14th U.S. state.
- March 13 – Thomas Paine's chief work Rights of Man (first part) is published in London.
- March – French Revolution: In France, the National Constituent Assembly accepts the recommendation of its Commission of Weights and Measures that the nation should adopt the metric system.

=== April–June ===
- April 21 – The first of forty boundary markers of the original District of Columbia, delineating the borders of the new District in the United States is laid at Jones Point Light in Alexandria, Virginia.
- April 29–May 8 – The first American ships reach Japan, brigantine Lady Washington captained by John Kendrick of Boston, and the brig Grace.
- May 3 – The Sejm of the Polish–Lithuanian Commonwealth proclaims the Constitution of May 3, 1791, the first modern codified constitution in Europe.
- June 20 – French Revolution: Flight to Varennes – The French Royal Family is captured when they try to flee in disguise.
- June 21 – The Ordnance Survey is founded in Great Britain for the production of maps.

=== July–September ===
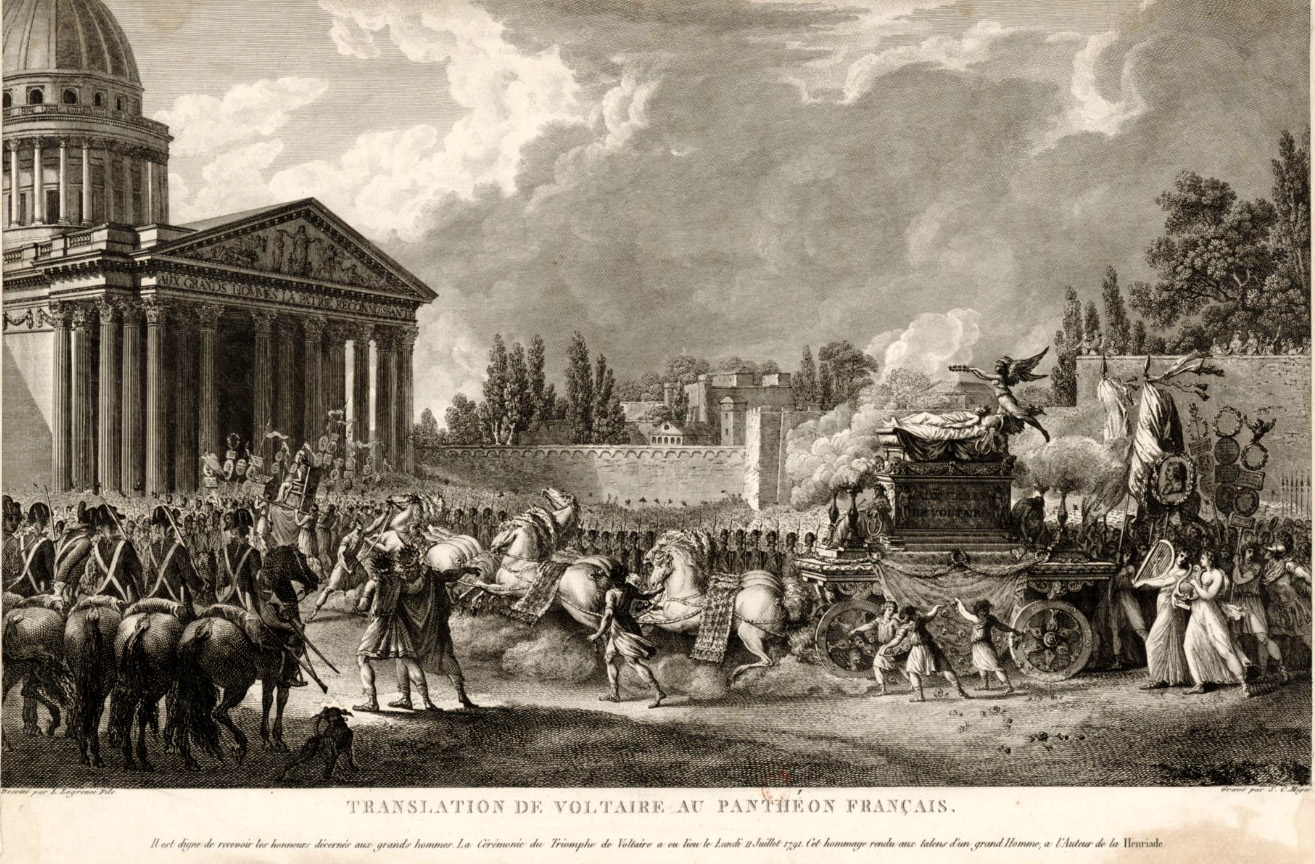
Translation of Voltaire

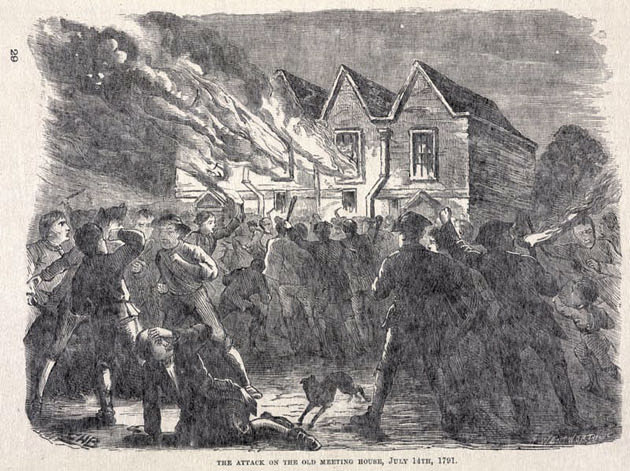
Priestley Riots

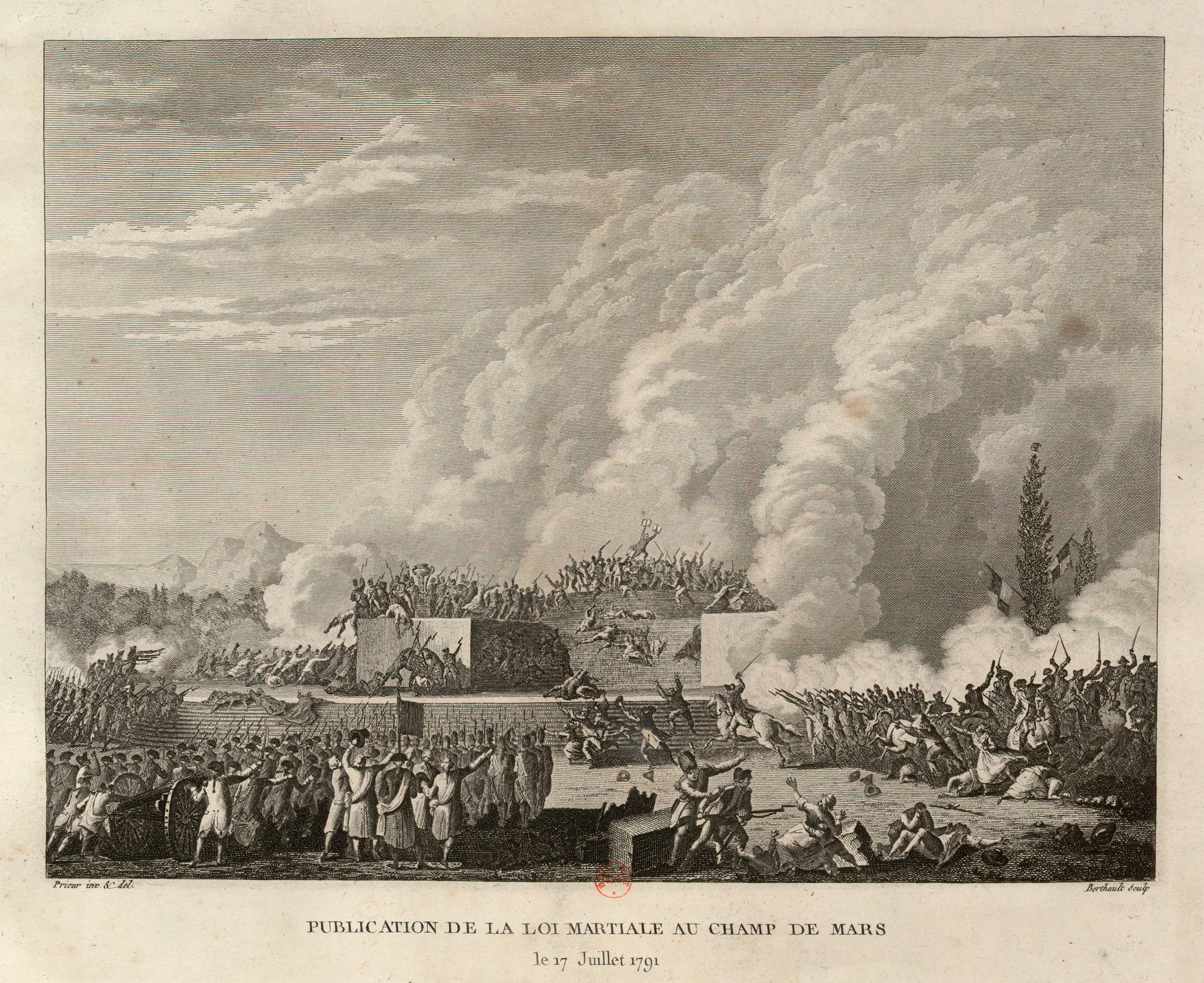
Champ de Mars massacre

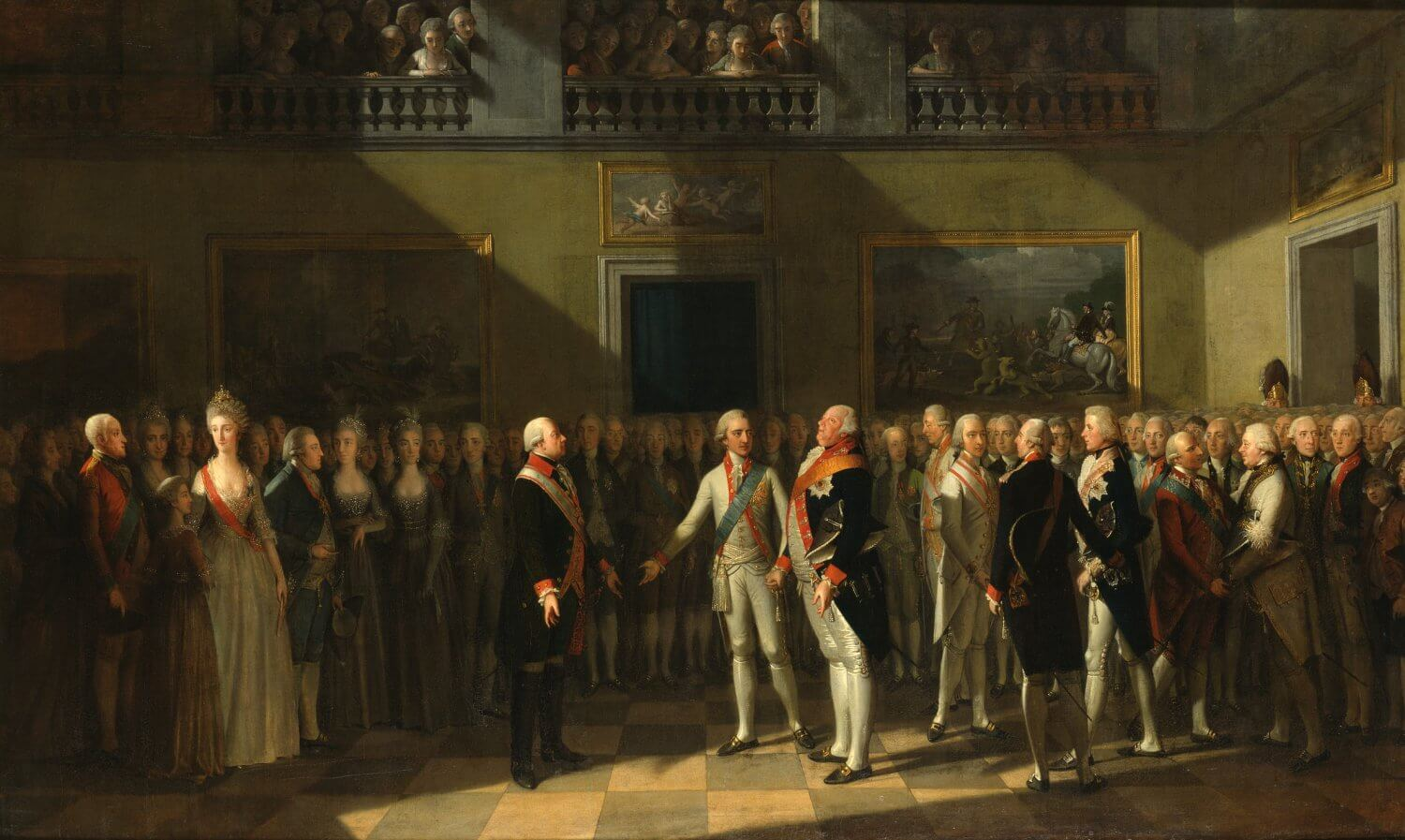
Declaration of Pillnitz
- July 8 – Austrian composer Joseph Haydn, on his visit to England, is awarded an honorary doctorate of music at the University of Oxford.
- July 11 – The ashes of Voltaire are transferred to the Panthéon in Paris.
- July 14–17 – Priestley Riots against Dissenters in Birmingham, England.
- July 17 – French Revolution: The Champ de Mars massacre occurs in Paris.
- August 4 – The Treaty of Sistova is signed, ending the Ottoman–Habsburg wars.
- August 6 – The Brandenburg Gate in Berlin (Prussia) is finished.
- August 7 – George Hammond is appointed as Great Britain's first minister to the United States.
- August 21 – Haitian Revolution: A slave rebellion breaks out in the French colony of Saint-Domingue.
- August 26 – John Fitch is granted a patent for the steamboat in the United States.
- August 27
  - Declaration of Pillnitz: A proclamation by Frederick William II of Prussia and the Habsburg Leopold II, Holy Roman Emperor, affirms their wish to "put the King of France in a state to strengthen the bases of monarchic government."
  - Third Anglo-Mysore War: Battle of Tellicherry – Off the south-west coast of India, a British Royal Navy patrol forces a French convoy bound for Mysore to surrender.
- September 5
  - An ordinance is written barring the game of baseball within 80 yards of the Meeting House in Pittsfield, Massachusetts, the first known reference to the game of baseball in North America.
  - Declaration of the Rights of Woman and of the Female Citizen is written by activist Olympe de Gouges in response to the Declaration of the Rights of Man and of the Citizen.
- September 6 – Wolfgang Amadeus Mozart's opera seria, La clemenza di Tito, premières at the Estates Theatre in Prague with Mozart conducting to mark the coronation of Leopold II as King of Bohemia.
- September 9 – The capital of the United States, Washington, D.C., is named after the incumbent 1st President George Washington.
- September 12 – The first serious secondary education school open to girls in Denmark, the Døtreskolen af 1791, is founded in Copenhagen.
- September 13 – French Revolution: King Louis XVI accepts the final version of the completed constitution.
- September 14 – French Revolution: The Papal States lose Avignon to Revolutionary France.
- September 25 – Mission Santa Cruz is founded by Basque Franciscan Father Fermín Lasuén, becoming the 12th mission in the California mission chain.
- September 28 – French Revolution: The law on Jewish emancipation is promulgated in France, the first such legislation in modern Europe.
- September 30 – Wolfgang Amadeus Mozart's singspiel opera The Magic Flute (Die Zauberflöte) premières at the Freihaus-Theater auf der Wieden in Vienna with Mozart conducting.

=== October–December ===
- October 1 – French Revolution: The Legislative Assembly (France) convenes.
- October 9 – Mission Nuestra Señora de la Soledad is founded by Father Fermín Lasuén, becoming the 13th mission in the California mission chain.
- October 19 – The Treaty of Drottningholm is signed between the Russian Empire and Sweden establishing an alliance between the two.
- October 28 – French Revolution: The Declaration of the Rights of Woman and of the Female Citizen is published in France.
- November 4 – St. Clair's Defeat, the worst loss suffered by the United States Army in fighting against American Indians, takes place in modern-day Mercer County, Ohio. Miami fighters led by Chief Mihsihkinaahkwa (Little Turtle) and by Shawnee warriors commanded by War Chief Weyapiersenwah (Blue Jacket) rout the forces of General Arthur St. Clair and kill 630 U.S. soldiers, along with hundreds of civilians.
- December 4 – The first issue of The Observer, the world's first Sunday newspaper, is published in London.
- December 5 – Austrian composer Wolfgang Amadeus Mozart dies early this morning aged 35 at his home in Vienna, having been bedridden since November 20 with a serious illness, perhaps acute rheumatic fever. On a mild and misty December 7, following a funeral service in St. Stephen's Cathedral, he is buried in a common unmarked grave (as customary at this time) in St. Marx Cemetery in the presence of Salieri, Süssmayr, van Swieten (his patron) and two other musicians.
- December 15 – Ratification by the states of the first ten amendments to the United States Constitution is completed, creating the United States Bill of Rights. Two additional amendments remain pending, and one of these is finally ratified in 1992, becoming the Twenty-seventh Amendment.
- December 23 – The Pale of Settlement is established by ukase of Catherine the Great, specifying those areas of the Russian Empire in which Jews are permitted permanent residency.

=== Date unknown ===
- The School for the Indigent Blind, the oldest continuously operating specialist school of its kind in the world, is founded in Liverpool, England, by blind ex-merchant seaman, writer and abolitionist Edward Rushton.
- Camembert cheese reputedly first made by Marie Harel, a farmer from Normandy.
- The Dar Hassan Pacha (palace) in the Casbah of Algiers is completed.
- The first printed manuscript of Dream of the Red Chamber by Cao Xueqin, one of the Classic Chinese Novels, begins publication posthumously.

== Births ==
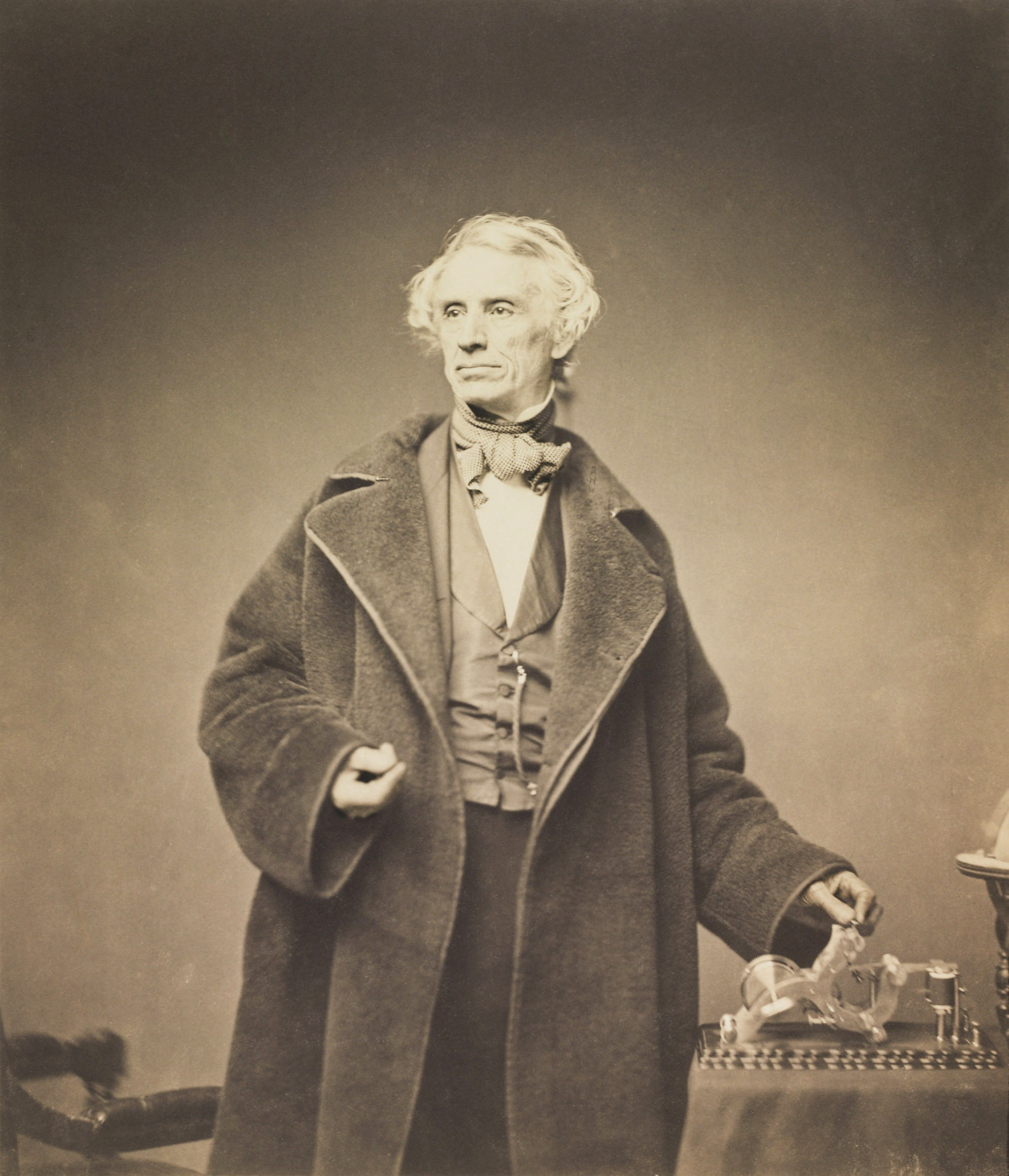
Samuel Morse

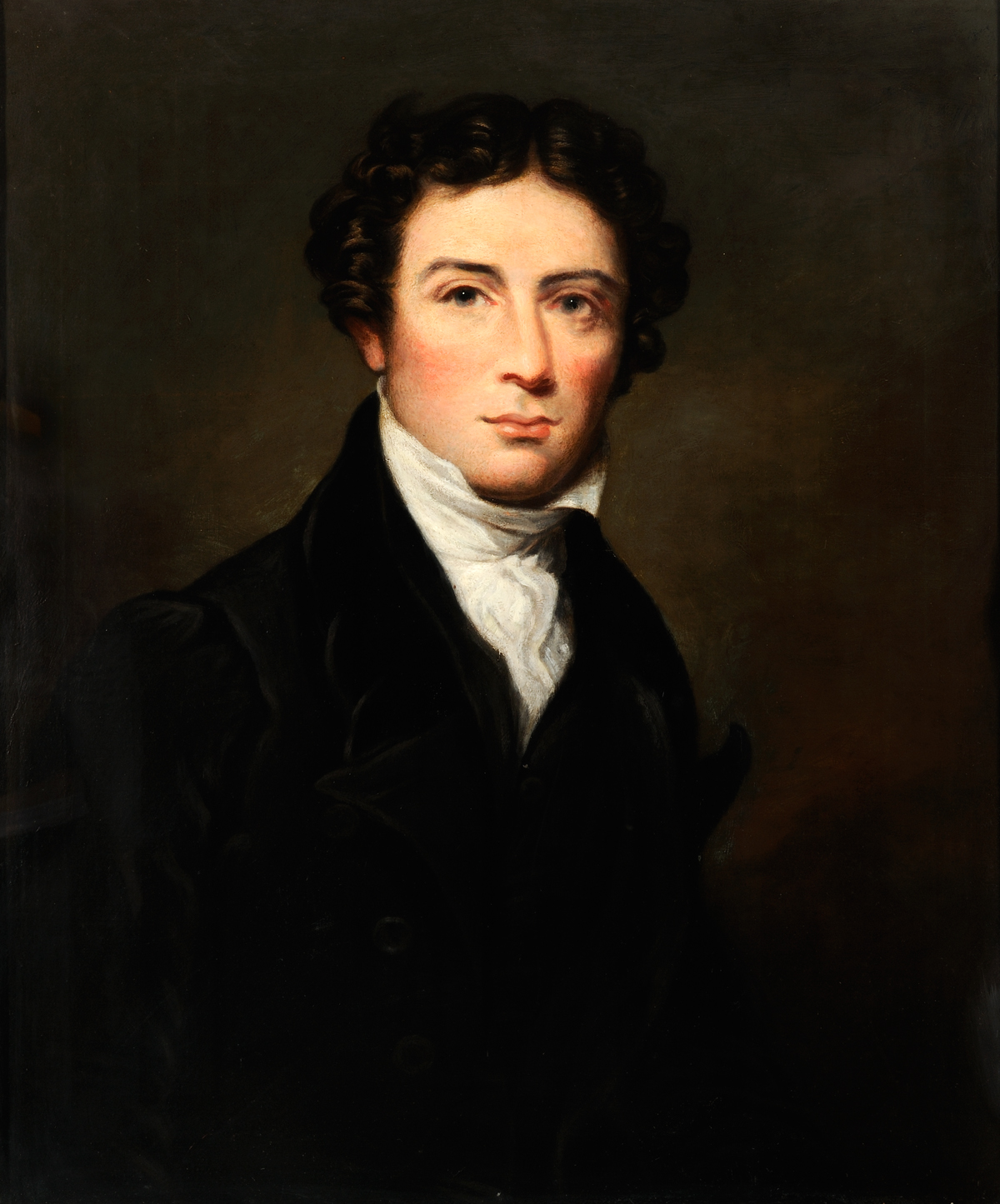
Michael Faraday

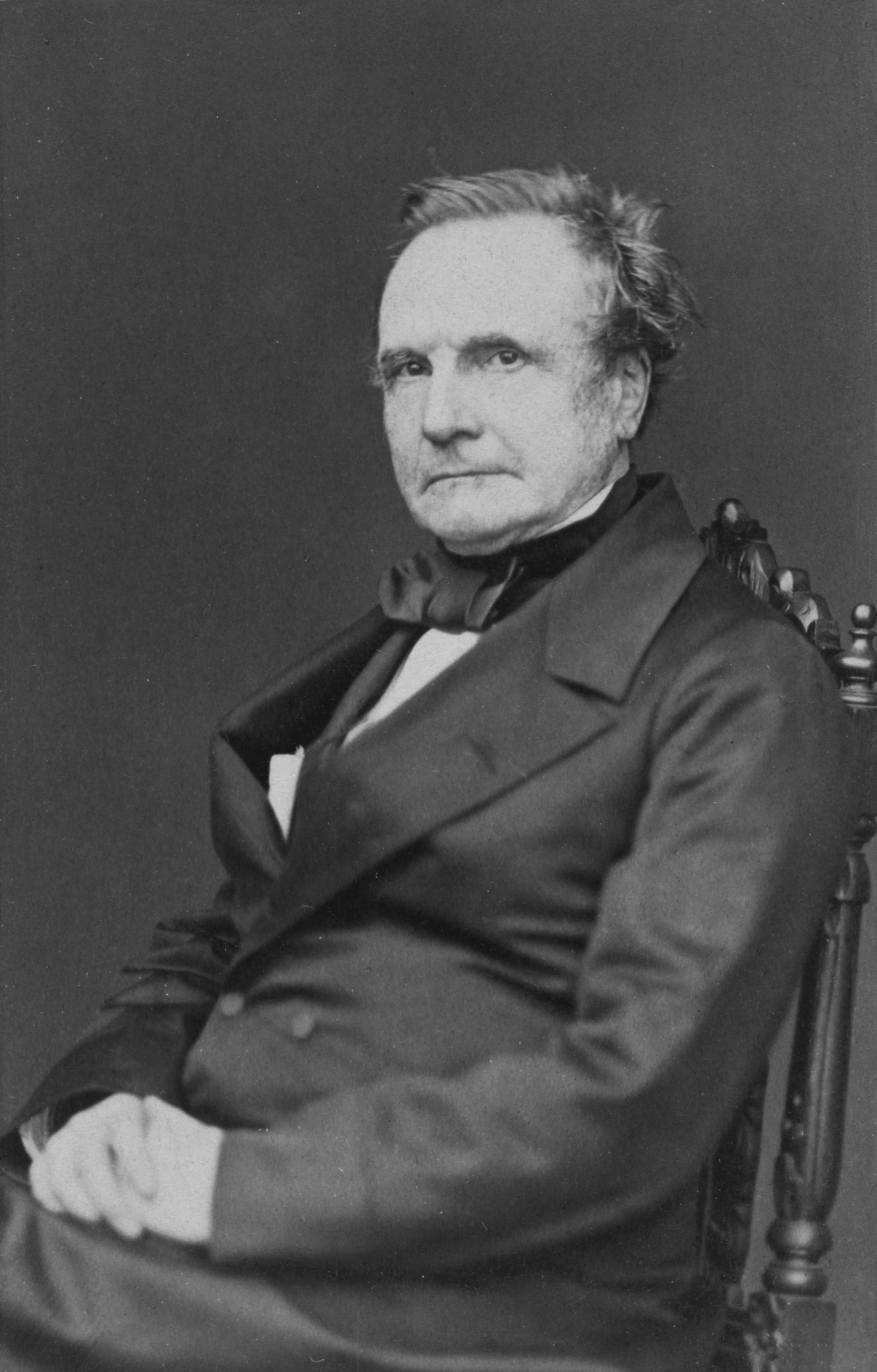
Charles Babbage

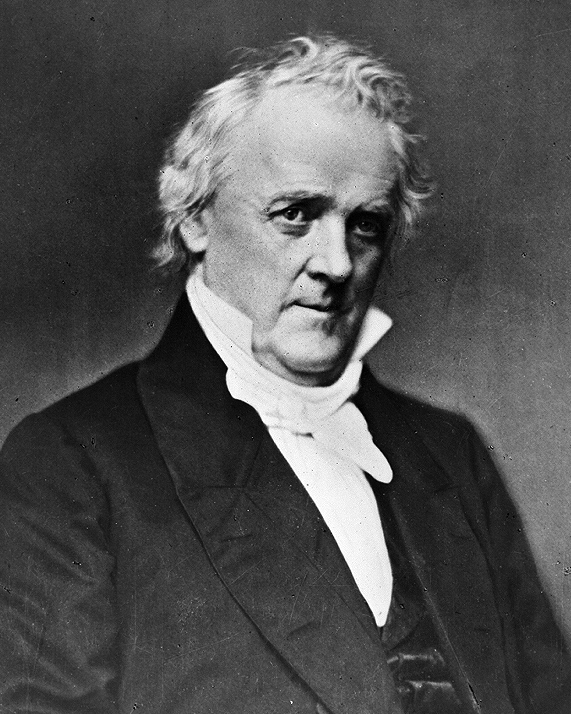
James Buchanan

- January 15 – Franz Grillparzer, Austrian writer (d. 1872)
- January 28 – Ferdinand Hérold, French composer (d. 1833)
- February 12 – Peter Cooper, American industrialist, inventor and philanthropist (d. 1883)
- February 15 – Friedrich Ludwig Weidig, German Protestant theologian, pastor and radical (suicide 1837)
- February 21
  - Carl Czerny, Austrian composer (d. 1857)
  - John Mercer, English chemist, industrialist (d. 1866)
- March 20 – Marie Ellenrieder, German painter (d. 1863)
- March 31 – Franciszek Mirecki, Polish composer, conductor and teacher (d. 1862)
- April 3 – Anne Lister, English landowner, diarist, mountaineer and traveller, "the first modern lesbian" (d. 1840)
- April 23 – James Buchanan, American lawyer, politician, and 15th President of the United States. (d. 1868)
- April 27 – Samuel Morse, American inventor (d. 1872)
- June 1 – John Nelson, American lawyer (d. 1860)
- June 30 – Félix Savart, French physicist (d. 1841)
- July 26 – Franz Xaver Wolfgang Mozart, Austrian composer, pianist (d. 1844)
- September 5 – Giacomo Meyerbeer, German composer (d. 1864)
- September 21 – István Széchenyi, Hungarian politician, writer (d. 1860)
- September 22 – Michael Faraday, English scientist (d. 1867)
- September 23
  - Johann Franz Encke, German astronomer (d. 1865)
  - Theodor Körner, German author, soldier (d. 1813)
- September 26 – Théodore Géricault, French painter (d. 1824)
- October 29 – John Elliotson, British physician (d. 1868)
- November 11 – Josef Munzinger, member of the Swiss Federal Council (d. 1855)
- December 7 – Ferenc Novák, Hungarian Slovene song collector and priest (d. 1836)
- December 26 – Charles Babbage, British mathematician, inventor (d. 1871)
- approximate date – Enriqueta Favez, Swiss-born physician, surgeon (d. 1856)

== Deaths ==
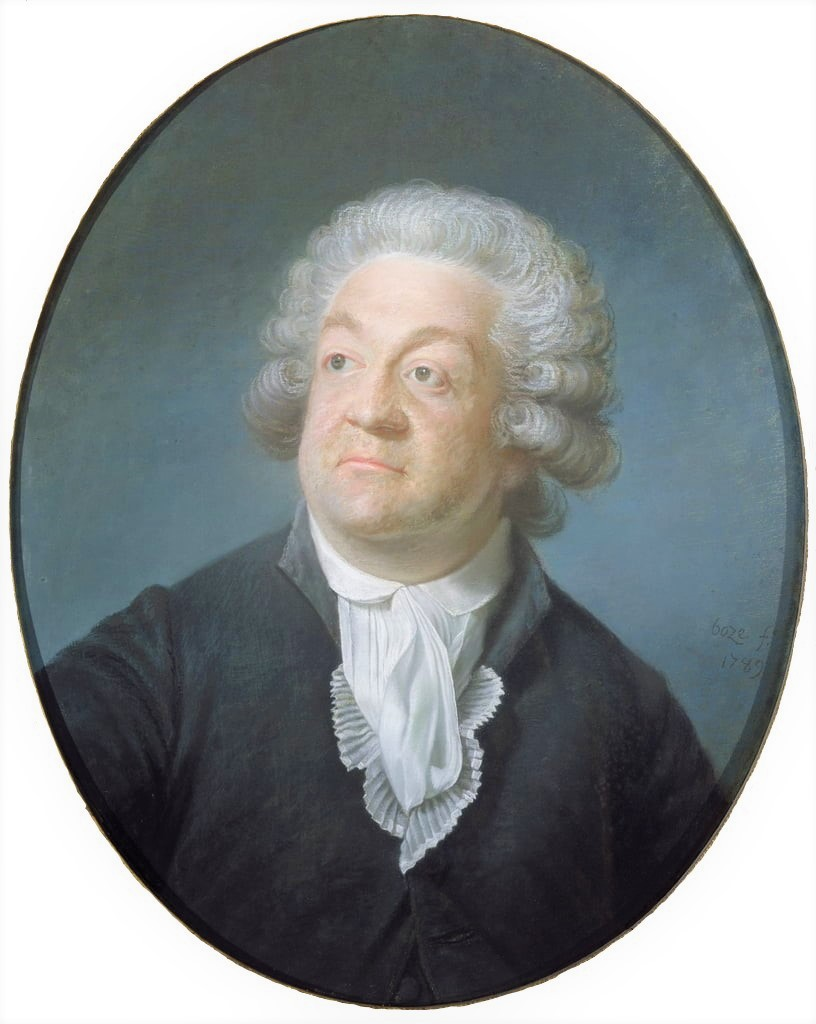
Honoré Gabriel Riqueti, comte de Mirabeau

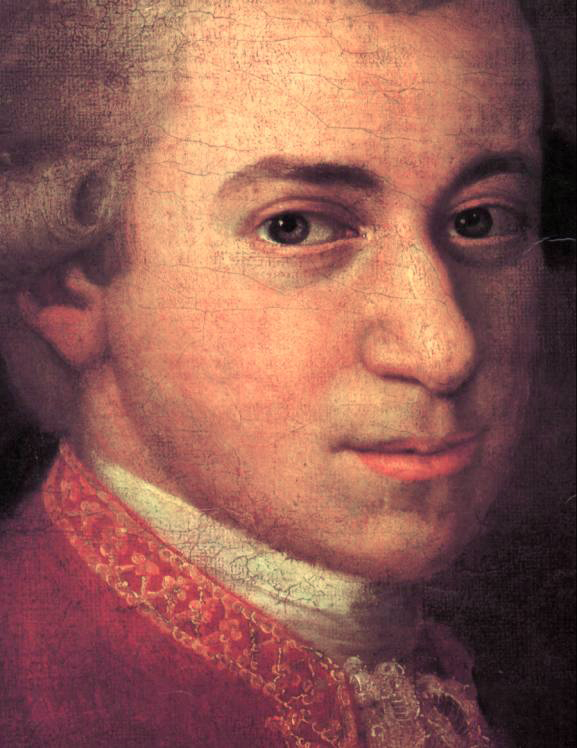
Wolfgang Amadeus Mozart

- January 11 – William Williams Pantycelyn, Welsh hymnist (b. 1717)
- January 23 – Johann Phillip Fabricius, German missionary (b. 1711)
- March 2 – John Wesley, English founder of Methodism (b. 1703)
- March 10 – William Wentworth, 2nd Earl of Strafford (1722–1791), England (b. 1722)
- March 14 – Johann Salomo Semler, German historian, Bible commentator (b. 1725)
- March 31 – Ralph Verney, 2nd Earl Verney of Ireland (b. 1714)
- April 2 – Honoré Gabriel Riqueti, comte de Mirabeau, French revolutionary leader (b. 1749)
- April 19 – Richard Price, Welsh philosopher (b. 1723)
- April 24 – Benjamin Harrison V, signer of the United States Declaration of Independence (b. 1726)
- May 9 – Francis Hopkinson, signer of the United States Declaration of Independence (b. 1737)
- June 5 – Frederick Haldimand, Swiss-born British colonial governor (b. 1718)
- June 10 – Toussaint-Guillaume Picquet de la Motte, French admiral (b. 1720)
- June 17 – Selina Hastings, Countess of Huntingdon, English Methodist leader (b. 1707)
- June 30 – Jean-Baptiste Descamps, Flemish painter and art historian (b. 1714)
- July 9 – Jacques-Nicolas Tardieu, French engraver (b. 1716)
- July 17 – Martin Dobrizhoffer, Austrian Jesuit missionary (b. 1717)
- July 25 – Isaac Low, American delegate to the Continental Congress (b. 1735)
- August 22 – Johann David Michaelis, German biblical scholar and teacher (b. 1717)
- September 25 – William Bradford, American printer (b. 1719)
- October 7 – Mary Frances of the Five Wounds, Italian Franciscan saint (b. 1715)
- October 12
  - Anna Louisa Karsch, German poet (b. 1722)
  - Peter Oliver, Massachusetts colonial judge (b. 1713)
- October 16 – Grigory Potemkin, Russian military leader, statesman, nobleman and favourite of Catherine the Great (b. 1739)
- November 4 – Richard Butler, American soldier (b. 1743)
- November 16 – Edward Penny, British painter (b. 1714)
- December 5 – Wolfgang Amadeus Mozart, German composer (b. in Salzburg, then part of the kingdom of Germany 1756)
- December 12
  - Etteilla, French occult cartomancer (b. 1738)
  - Catharina Freymann, Norwegian pietist leader (b. 1708)
- December 13 – Mathieu Tillet, French botanist (b. 1714)
- December 19 – Jean-François de Neufforge, Flemish architect and engraver (b. 1714)
- December 27 – John Monro, British physician of Bethlem Hospital (b. 1716)
- date unknown – Maria Petraccini, Italian anatomist, physician (b. 1759)
