= Rencoret =

Rencoret is a surname. Notable people with the surname include:

- Camilo Rencoret (born 1991), Chilean footballer
- Juan Nepomuceno Rencoret (1856-?), Chilean doctor
- María Eugenia Rencoret (born 1964), Chilean director and producer of telenovelas
- Pedro Lira Rencoret (1845–1912), Chilean painter and art critic
