= Associação Naval de Lisboa =

Portuguese rowing club

- ANL burgee

- Portuguese National Ensign
- Full name: Associação Naval de Lisboa
- Short name: ANL
- Founded: 1856
- Location: Lisbon, Portugal
- Focus: Rowing and sailing
- Website: www.anl.pt

Founded in 1856, Associação Naval de Lisboa (Lisbon Naval Association) is the oldest sport club of Portugal and one of the 30 oldest yacht clubs in Europe.

The main sports are the sailing and rowing.
