= Treaty of Drottningholm =

Treaty between Russia and Sweden against France

Treaty of Drottningholm (1791)
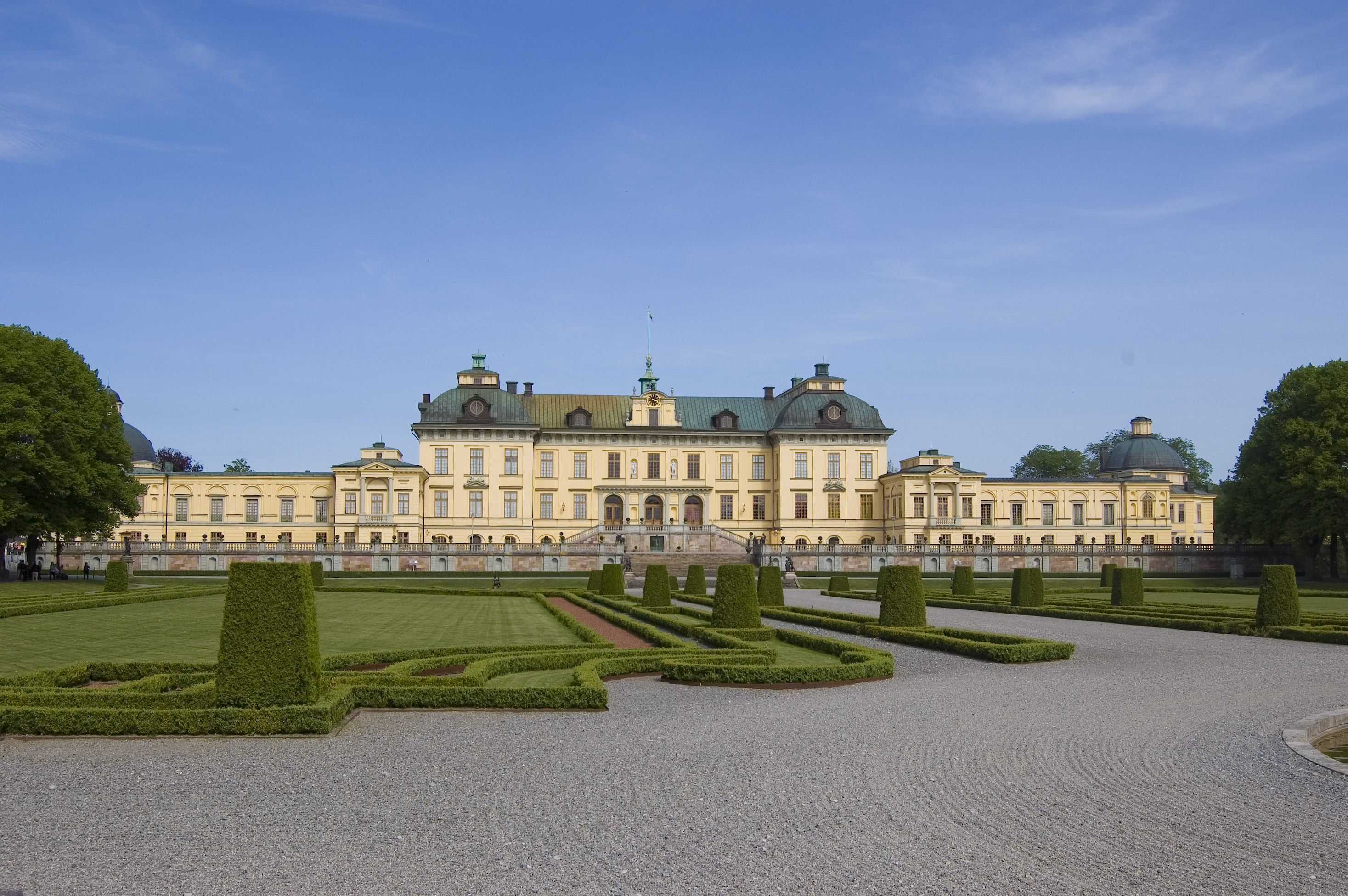
- Drottningholm palace, where the treaty was signed.
- Signed: October 19, 1791
- Location: Drottningholm, Sweden
- Ratified: 7 December 1791
- Signatories: (Russian Empire) Catherine the Great; (Swedish Empire) Gustav III
- Parties: Russian Empire; (Swedish Empire) Sweden
- Language: Russian

Treaty of Drottningholm (1791) was a treaty signed between Sweden and Russia on the 19th of October 1791, which aimed to establish a long lasting peace and also acting as an alliance between them against Revolutionary France.

== Stipulations ==
- Both sides commit themselves to upholding the peace between the two
- Both sides pledge military assistance to each other within 4 months of the request, with Sweden promising 8,000 infantry and 2,000 cavalry, and Russia promising 12,000 infantry and 4,000 cavalry.
- Both sides pledge naval assistance, with each side promising 9 ships of the line and 3 frigates in the case of war.
- Russia agrees to pay Sweden annual subsidies amounting to about 300,000 rubles.
