= Elizabeth Marney Conner =

American dramatic reader and educator

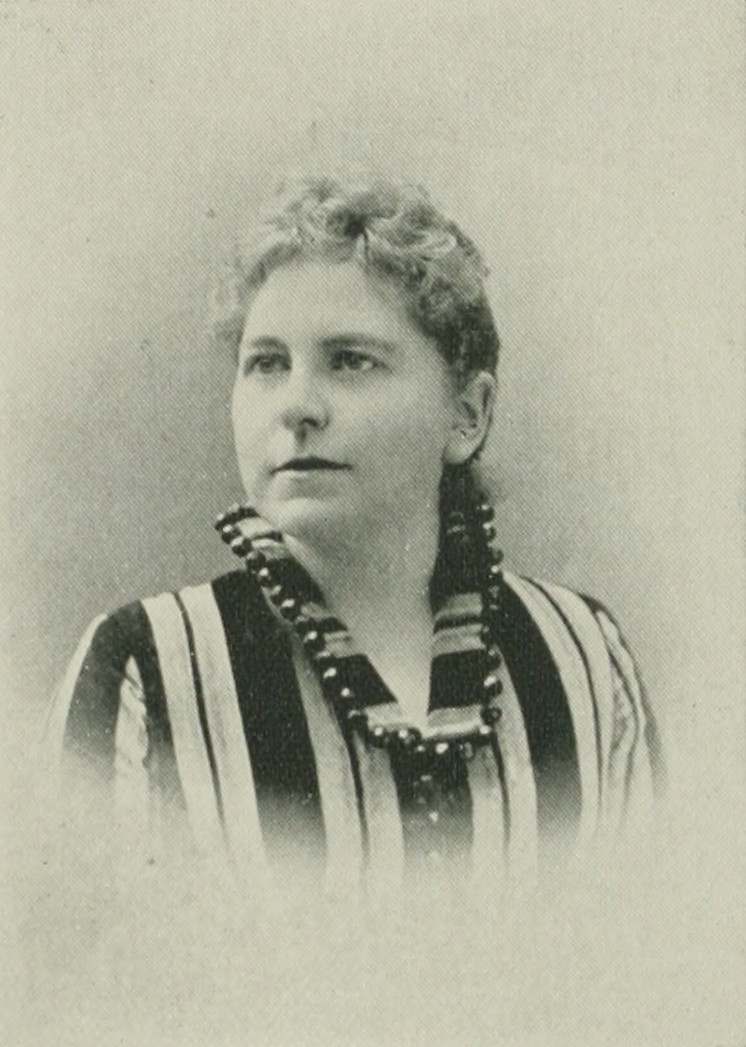
- Photo in A Woman of the Century
- Born: Elizabeth Marney; February 26, 1856; Rouses Point, New York, U.S.
- Died: May 1941 (aged 85); Buffalo, New York, U.S.
- Resting place: Elmwood Cemetery, Burlington, Vermont
- Occupations: dramatic reader, educator
- Spouse: Marcus A. Conner
- Writing career
- Pen name: Paul Veronique
- Language: English

Elizabeth Marney Conner (née, Marney; pen name Paul Veronique; February 26, 1856 – May 1941) was a 19th-century American dramatic reader and educator. She published recitations in prose and verse, and was also the author of an operetta. In 1884, Conner founded the Buffalo School of Elocution.

== Early life ==
Elizabeth Marney was born in Rouses Point, New York, February 26, 1856.

== Career ==
At the age of 18, she married Marcus A. Conner, of Burlington, Vermont, who died in 1881 in a drowning accident, leaving her with two young sons to care for and educate. It was then Conner began to consider her ambitions. With decided abilities for music, literature and the drama, circumstances led her to choose some form of dramatic work, and she began the careful study of elocution. In January, 1884, the Buffalo School of Elocution and Literature was opened by Conner, and after then, she rapidly succeeded as teacher and artist in her profession, having gained for herself and school an enviable local reputation, and being well known in a far wider territory. Her lecture on "Expression" with illustrative readings was in demand from school, pulpit and platform.

She published recitations in both prose and verse under the pen-name "Paul Veronique," a strong poem, "Death of Samson". She also composed a song entitled "Be not so Sure", which was well received, and was also the author of the operetta "Eulalie, a Fairy Operetta in Two Acts, for Children" (libretto by Conner, music by Mary M. Howard). Although her success as a teacher and reader was exceptional, it was considered by many that her true place was on the stage. She had a strong personality and magnetic presence, intense dramatic fervor, a fine voice and versatile powers of expression.

== Buffalo School of Elocution and Literature ==
Conner came to Buffalo with the object of establishing a training school of elocution and English literature. She made arrangements with the YMCA, and secured the necessary rooms for her venture before the outside doors were on the new building, which was nearing completion. The Buffalo School of Elocution and Literature was opened on the January 10, 1884, and was, from the beginning, a success. Establishing an institution of learning in a large city necessitated long hours; but the results were exemplary.

The methods employed by Conner were far advanced than any ever before attempted in Buffalo. The physical and vocal drill class was a novelty, and was, from the first, highly prized by the students. The vocal practice eradicated all nasal, shrill, and guttural tones, while the Delsarte method of exercising every muscle of the frame was beneficial to the body. As a preliminary to graduation from the Training School of Elocution, each pupil was required to give a public reading, the audience consisting of invited friends. These entertainments, in Association Hall, afforded a literary treat to the audience, and were an index of the accomplishments to be achieved by a course of study in such a school and under a teacher whose refining influence left an indelible impression on the pupil.

At the close of the second year of the school, three pupils were graduated with honor. One became a teacher of elocution in the Buffalo High School. Another was for a long time associated with Conner in the school work. The third became a professional reader. On the completion of the third year, three more pupils received diplomas. One of that number, subsequently received the degree of Bachelor of Oratory at the Monroe School in Boston. The following year witnessed the graduation of six more pupils, some of whom became employed in the theatrical profession, in lecturing, reading, and teaching. Seven pupils were graduated in the class of 1888, and a larger number of juniors received certificates than at any previous year. Aside from the graduates' and postgraduates' recitals, the school gave frequent entertainments, such as "Shakespeare" and "Longfellow" afternoons, "Dickens," "Bryant,"' and "Whittier" evenings. Special lectures were given in connection with the regular course of study.

Owing to the constant increase of business, it became necessary for Conner to seek larger and more commodious quarters than the WMCA building afforded. A new location, at the junction of Mohawk, Genesee and Pearl streets, was secured. It was enlarged by establishing a second department, the Conservatory of Music under the able direction of Mary M. Howard, of Buffalo. After operating the school for more than a decade, Conner left Buffalo in 1898 to give elocution recitals on a tour of the Pacific coast. She remained in the west for several years, working with a western college, before returning to New York in 1905. A follower of Christian Science, in 1906, in Buffalo, she was one of the founders of the International Progressive Thought League, along with Grace Carew Sheldon. She traveled to Detroit and established a Progressive Thought reading room there.

Leaving Buffalo again, around 1909, Conner resumed her speaking and writing efforts, mainly throughout New York State. She published a book The Golden Pomegranates of Eden which dealt with sex education and worked for fifteen years on a book The Moon Faery. She gave an illustrated talk on "the Divine art of expression", with musical interludes, before the New Thought Alliance, in Alliance Hall, Detroit, Michigan, May 10, 1912. In 1931, she returned to Buffalo for its centennial celebration, advising that she was working and speaking as a peace activist. At the time, she was living in Brooklyn. In 1932, she returned to Buffalo to speak at a Women's Democratic Club meeting.

== Personal life ==
Elizabeth Marney Conner died in Buffalo, New York, May 1941, and was buried at Elmwood Cemetery, Burlington, Vermont, May 31, 1941.

== Selected works ==
- Golden Pomegranates of Eden, 1908
