= Driver (clipper) =

19th c. US clipper ship

History

United States
- Name: Driver
- Owner: David Ogden et al
- Port of registry: New York
- Route: Liverpool – Port of New York
- Builder: Currier and Townsend, Newburyport
- Launched: 1854
- In service: 7 September 1854
- Out of service: 1856
- Fate: Lost at sea, February 1856

General characteristics
- Class & type: Barque/Clipper
- Tons burthen: 1594 bom
- Sail plan: Three-masted barque

Driver was a clipper ship, constructed for David Ogden et al. in 1854 at Newburyport, Massachusetts. She sailed between New York and Liverpool carrying immigrants to the US for the Red Cross Line. She was lost at sea with no known survivors after setting sail from Liverpool 12 February 1856. 377 died.

== Development and design ==
Driver was constructed in Newburyport in 1854 for David Ogden et al. It seems likely that she was constructed by Currier and Townsend as were the other clippers owned by David Ogden that sailed for the same Red Cross Line.

Question has been raised over her characterisation as a true clipper ship due to her less clipper like hull shape, however her sail plan was lofty and heavily sparred allowing her to reach great speed. Advertisements of the day certainly described her as a clipper – "The magnificent first-class extraordinary fast-sailing American-built Clipper Ship Driver."

== Service history ==
Driver made four successful return voyages between New York and Liverpool under the captaincy of Nicholas Holberton. He was an experienced captain who had been the master of the ships Noemi and Andrew Foster for the same shipowners.

The ship left Newburyport on 7 September 1854 for St John's New Brunswick, then to Liverpool. She arrived in England for the first time 28 October 1854. After what seems to have been a number of aborted starts due to leaks, Driver left for her first westward voyage to New York on 25 January 1855.

Passage on the ship was advertised by the Tapscott's line for travel to New York. Freight was also carried. A berth could be booked for a family for £1 deposit. Weekly provisions for the journey were 3 lbs of good Navy bread, 1 lb of flour, 2 lbs of oatmeal, 1 lb of beef, 1 lb of pork, 1 lb of peas, 1 lb of rice, 1 lb of sugar, 2 oz of tea, 2 oz of salt and a pint of vinegar for the voyage. Each adult was provided with 3 quarts of water daily. Utensils and bedding were to be provided by the passengers. These advertisements were run extensively and continued to include Driver in their shipping list even months after her loss.

Driver arrived safely in New York on 14 February 1855. For the return voyage on 21 April she had 151 passengers on board. Many were returning emigrants.

She arrived Liverpool 11 May 1855 and left again for New York on 8 June. She arrived in America after a voyage of 38 days on the 16 July.

Her following journeys were as follows; left New York around 27 August 1855, to arrive back in Liverpool 19 September. Then she left Liverpool 17 October and arrived in New York before 27 November.

While on her final eastward voyage to England, 17 year old seaman Peter Connolly stabbed able seaman William Henry Barnes during an altercation. Barnes died in hospital not long after their arrival in Liverpool on 19 January 1856. Connolly was convicted of manslaughter and sentenced to a month's imprisonment with hard labour. The judge considered this a lenient service for Connolly as the deceased was "a very violent man".

Two passengers on board ship for this journey were convicted of theft from a fellow passenger. A box of goods worth £350 was taken from Louis Sancan by John Flood and William Johnson. They were convicted after Mr Sancan identified his belongings in the accused home.

Driver left Liverpool for on her final voyage on 12 February. She carried a crew of 6 officers, 22 men and 344 passengers. A full list of passengers and officers was published in the New York Herald of 22 June 1856.

== Loss at sea ==
Driver was never heard from again. She was presumed lost in the ice of the North Atlantic. Newspapers of the time reported that the ice was particularly bad this year. Other ships encountered dangerous conditions, for example the G. B. Larmer was a day and half fixed in the ice and "narrowly escaped destruction".

A possible sighting was made by the crew of ship Amazon on 28 April 1856. For a time this may have raised hopes that Driver was delayed. However the sighting was never confirmed.

A number of other ships were lost around the same time, also presumed to be due to the ice. Notably the Ocean Queen set sail from London on 12 February 1856. She signalled "all well" off the Isle of Wight on 15 February, but no other word was heard. She carried a crew of 33 and 90 passengers.
