= Telémaco Susini =

Argentine physician (1856–1936)

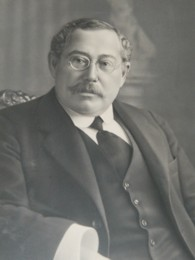
Telémaco Susini

Telémaco Susini (January 27, 1856 – June 1, 1936) was an Argentinian physician.

== Educational training ==
He studied medicine at the University of Buenos Aires . Deeply anticlerical, as a university student he led the fire at the Colegio del Salvador in 1875. During the course of his studies he felt a permanent inclination towards all knowledge of human anatomy, more precisely the structures of organs and their diseases, that is to say, pathology. Thus, his doctoral thesis De él Contribución al estudio del empacho was the beginning of a recognized and fruitful academic and teaching career.

He then traveled to Europe to perfect his knowledge. There, he was a disciple of Luis Pasteur and Robert Koch (founder of medical bacteriology and discoverer of the bacillus that causes tuberculosis ). These teachers were, at that time, in close competition for the achievement of a vaccine against malignant anthrax and prompted Susini to investigate cattle anthrax, the virulent and contagious disease of sheep, cattle and goats that can be transmitted to the species. human, a disease that turned out to be caused by the same pathogenic agent. In Europe, in addition, he specialized in otorhinolaryngology, and was, once back in Argentina, the first specialist in the country. He would later become a trainer of new specialists.

== Return to his country ==
In 1886, already back in Argentina, he was appointed director of Public Assistance. In this position, he not only improved and expanded hospital services, but also poured all his knowledge into comprehensive work on hygiene, health, and quality of life for the population, directing and supporting the expansion and creation of new hospital services, bringing him closer to people not only better medical care but also knowledge about the importance of hygiene and disease prevention.

In the academic field, in 1887 Susini was appointed full professor of the Chair of Pathological Studies, a task in which he would perform for thirty years. This chair eventually became the Institute of Pathological Anatomy, which is now called the Susini Institute. In addition, he created the Museum of Pathological Anatomy.

In 1918, he was one of the protagonists of the University Reform. President Hipólito Yrigoyen named him Comptroller of the University of Córdoba, with the support of the reformist students. However, strong opposition from conservative sectors forced him to resign almost immediately. His book "Social problems and the Catholic Church" was published in 1919 by the Agencia Sud-Americana de Libros (Buenos Aires).

== Family ==
His son, Enrique Telémaco Susini (1891–1972), was a noted pioneer in radio and film in Argentina.
