= Demetrio Castillo Duany =

- Born: November 17, 1856; Santiago de Cuba, Captaincy General of Cuba
- Died: November 27, 1922 (aged 66); Santiago de Cuba, Republic of Cuba
- Military career
- Allegiance: Cuba
- Service years: 1895–1898
- Rank: Brigadier General
- Conflicts: Cuban War of Independence; *Battle of Yerba de Guinea; *Battle of La Curia; *Battle of El Triunfo; *Battle of Sao del Indio; Battle of Loma de Gato; Spanish–American War; *Cuban Campaign
- Other work: politician

Demetrio Castillo Duany (November 17, 1856 – November 27, 1922) was a Cuban revolutionary, soldier, and politician. He fought in the Cuban Independence and Spanish–American wars.

Demetrio Castillo Duany was born in Santiago de Cuba, into one of the leading families of the eastern region of Cuba and he went to France for his education. After spending some years at the Lycée of Bordeaux he went on to the United States where he studied English and entered an established business house.

In 1878, at the age of twenty-two, he returned to Santiago de Cuba to take charge of the interests of his mother. A year later the outbreak of the "little war" obliged him to emigrate to the United States where he remained until 1885.

At the outbreak of war in 1895, he joined the Revolutionary forces under Victoriano Garzón during the War of Independence. He was soon transferred to the staff of José Maceo. His valor and enterprise brought him rapid advancement. He became Lieutenant Colonel after the actions of Yerba de Guinea and la Curia and became Colonel after the battles at El Triunfo and Sao del Indio. Three days before the fatal encounter of Loma de Gato in which Maceo lost his life he promoted Castillo Duany to the rank of Brigadier General.

When the United States entered the war against Spain, General Garcia selected Brigadier General Castillo Duany to confer with the American commanders and to arrange for cooperation with them. In fulfilment of this commission General Castillo Duany conferred with Admiral Sampson on board the battleship New York to concert plans for the landing of American troops and to provide for joint action with the Cuban forces. Under his command, the Cubans captured Siboney and thus reduced the risk of the disembarkation of the American force. He continued to cooperate with the Americans throughout the remainder of the war.

He also opened a business school in New York and was in the Cuban presidential cabinet heading War and Navy.

When hostilities ceased he turned to politics. In 1898 he was named Governor of Santiago de Cuba and was later appointed Civil Governor of the Eastern Province under the American Intervention. He was one of the founders of the Republican party in Oriente which later merged with the Liberal party. In 1906 he was associated with the Revolutionary Committee and was arrested and imprisoned until the arrival of the American commissioners, who released him. Soon thereafter, Governor Charles Magoon appointed him Chief of the Penitentiary of the Republic. In consequence of the Revolution of 1916–1917 he retired from office and resumed the life of a private citizen. He died in his native city of Santiago de Cuba.

== Sources ==
- Direccion Provincial de Cultura - Día 17. Nace en Santiago de Cuba el patriota Demetrio Castillo Duany at www.cultstgo.cult.cu
- Count of Duany
- History book Castillo Duany University of Miami
- Hewitt PhD thesis
- New York Times
- books.google.com
