= Mary Catherine Crowley =

American writer (1856–1920)

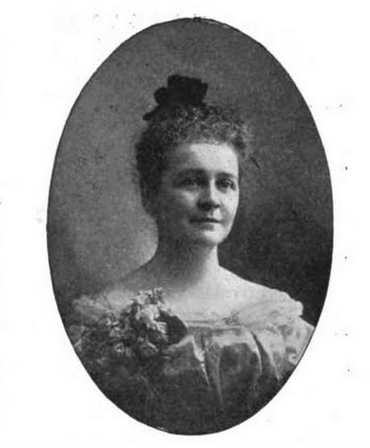
- Born: Mary Catherine Crowley; November 28, 1856; Boston, Massachusetts, U.S.
- Died: May 4, 1920 (aged 63)
- Occupation: Author
- Relatives: Lochiel
- Writing career
- Pen name: Janet Grant
- Language: English
- Genres: poetry, prose, novels, juvenile literature
- Subject: history of Detroit

Mary Catherine Crowley (pen name, Janet Grant; November 28, 1856 – May 4, 1920) was an American author of poems and novels. She was also an accomplished musician and linguist. Crowley began her literary work in 1877 as a contributor of poems and short stories to Wide Awake, St. Nicholas Magazine, Ladies' Home Journal, and The Pilot. In 1892, she went to Europe and on her return, lived for ten years in Detroit, where she was a collaborator on the Memorial History of the city. Crowley was a recognized authority on the early history of that city, and a leader in its bicentennial celebration in 1901, the pageant being founded on descriptions in her book A Daughter of New France.

Her later years were spent in New York City, where, from 1907, she edited the Catholic Missions Magazine and the Annals of the Propagation of the Faith. Crowley lectured extensively on art and literature, and was the author of several novels: Merry Hearts and True (1889), Happy'-Go-Lucky (1890), Apples, Ripe and Rosy (1893), The City of Wonders (1894), The Sentinel of Metz (1897), An Every Day Girl (1900), Tilderee (1900), A Daughter of New France (1901), The Heroine of the Straits (1902), Love Thrives in War (1903), and In Treaty with Honor (1906). She died in 1920.

== Early years and education ==
Mary Catherine Crowley was born on November 28, 1856, in Boston, Massachusetts. Her father, John Colman Crowley, was a Harvard graduate, and her mother, Mary Jane Cameron, a graduate of the Academy of the Sacred Heart, Manhattanville, New York. She was the granddaughter of Daniel Crowley, one of the first Catholics of Boston, and on the maternal side, a direct descendant from Lochiel, the Catholic chieftain of Scotland. Her early education was with the Sisters of Notre Dame, and she was an alumna of the Academy of the Sacred Heart.

== Career ==
In the early 1880s, Crowley and her parents moved to Detroit, Michigan. Crowley contributed to many Catholic magazines and periodicals, notably Fr. Russell's Magazine, The Irish Monthly, and The Ave Maria. She was also a contributor to secular magazines for young people, such as the St. Nicholas Magazine, The Youth's Companion, as well as magazines for older readers, including the Boston Globe where she used the pen name, "Janet Grant". Crowley served as editor of the Catholic Mission Magazine and The Annals of the Propagation of the Faith from 1907. She was known for her contributions to juvenile literature. She was one of the historians on the "Memorial History of Detroit," and was considered an authority on the early history of that city. She suggested and brought about the erection of a memorial tablet to Marie-Therese Guyon ("Mme. Cadillac, the first white woman of the Northwest").

A resident of Detroit for nearly ten years, Crowley made herself thoroughly familiar with the early history of that region, and from her acquaintance with old French families, and from the pages of old memoirs, she gathered the material for her first historical novel, The Heroine of the Strait. It is a romance of Detroit in the time of Pontiac, the "King Philip" of the Ottawas. Crowley's scholarship and invention were demonstrated in the depicting of the conspiracy of Pontiac and the siege of Detroit by the Native Americans under his command. Crowley includes many pictures of life in the ordinary among the French population. The situations include dramatic intensity and interesting conversations. The book was published by Little, Brown and Company, Boston. She died in New York, May 4, 1920.

== Selected works ==
- 1889, Happy-go-lucky and other stories
- 1889, Merry hearts and true : stories from life
- 1890, An every-day girl
- 1892, Tramp and trinkets abroad, and other stories
- 1894, The City of Wonders : a souvenir of the Worlds̓ Fair
- 1898, The child crusaders, and other stories
- 1901, A daughter of New France. With some account of the gallant Sieur Cadillac and his colony on the Detroit.
- 1902, The heroine of the Strait; a romance of Detroit in the time of Pontiac
- 1903, Love thrives in war; a romance of the frontier in 1812
- 1906, In treaty with honor : a romance of old Quebec
