= Enriqueta Favez =

Swiss physician and surgeon

- Born: c. 1791; Lausanne, Switzerland
- Died: 1856; New Orleans
- Education: Sorbonne
- Occupation: Physician
- Spouse(s): A French soldier (name unknown); Juana de Léon
- Children: One daughter (name unknown), died in infancy

Enriqueta Favez (c. 1791 – 1856) also known as Enrique Favez, Henriette Favez and Henrietta Faber, was a Swiss medical doctor and surgeon who practiced medicine in the Napoleonic Wars and in Cuba. Although born female, Favez lived as a male surgeon for approximately four years in Cuba—a fact that culminated in a well-documented trial and expulsion from the Spanish territories. Following his expulsion, he lived the remainder of her life as Sor Magdalena, a nurse for Daughters of Charity Services in New Orleans, eventually rising to the position of Mother Superior for that congregation.

== Biography ==
Enriqueta Favez may have been born into a bourgeois family in Lausanne, Switzerland, around 1791. His family origin is unverifiable, and undocumented. According to his own testimony, collected during a trial in Cuba, his parents died while he was an infant, and he was married to a French soldier at the age of 15 (c. 1806) by an uncle. Three years later, both his husband and infant daughter died. The former allegedly died in battle, the latter died for unknown reasons at eight days old.

Favez remained in Paris and took up the study of medicine at the Sorbonne, taking on the dress and identity of a male army officer with his deceased husband's rank. After Favez's graduation, he worked as a French army surgeon during the Napoleonic Wars, allegedly alongside his uncle, until he was captured by Wellington's forces in Spain, and imprisoned.

After the war, Favez left for Cuba. He was licensed by the medical board in Habana, and started a practice in Baracoa, then a small outpost in eastern Cuba. His clients included the largely poor local population.

Eventually, Favez married an impoverished, mestizo woman from a neighboring town, Juana de Léon. Although Juana was most likely aware of the fact that Favez was biologically female, there is lingering speculation about whether Juana knew of that fact when they were married.

Four years after his marriage to Juana, and successful integration into the elite in Baracoa, speculation about Favez' biological sex surfaced. Despite efforts to stem rumors, Favez was found inebriated, with his shirt unbuttoned, by a servant, who promptly informed the local authorities. Favez was arrested, imprisoned, and put on trial. The charges cited by the court included the illegal practice of medicine by a woman, fraud against the medical board and local authorities, and coercing a woman into disreputable marriage. Forcible examinations by local doctors revealed his sexual anatomy, and several accusatory letters allegedly written by Juana de Léon surfaced throughout his trial. Historical documents at his trial record that he defended himself against the charges by stating that he was a male spirit in a female body. Favez was declared guilty, and his marriage to Juana de Léon was annulled.

After deliberations, the court in Baracoa sought to place Favez in the Hospital de Paula de la ciudad de La Habana, in Havana, to serve a four-year sentence. The Hospital rejected this arrangement, and requested that Favez be transferred to La Casa de Recogidas de San Francisco de Paula, a secure institution housing female criminals, citing concerns over its own lack of security and "proper" supervision.

Following his second recorded suicide attempt, Favez was barred from the institution, as well as the Spanish territories, and placed on a ship to New Orleans, where he joined the Daughters of Charity Services as a nun. As Sor Magdalena, he continued to provide medical aid to the poor, and later became the Mother Superior of her Congregation. He died in New Orleans at the age of 65, having never returned to Cuba.

== Legacy ==
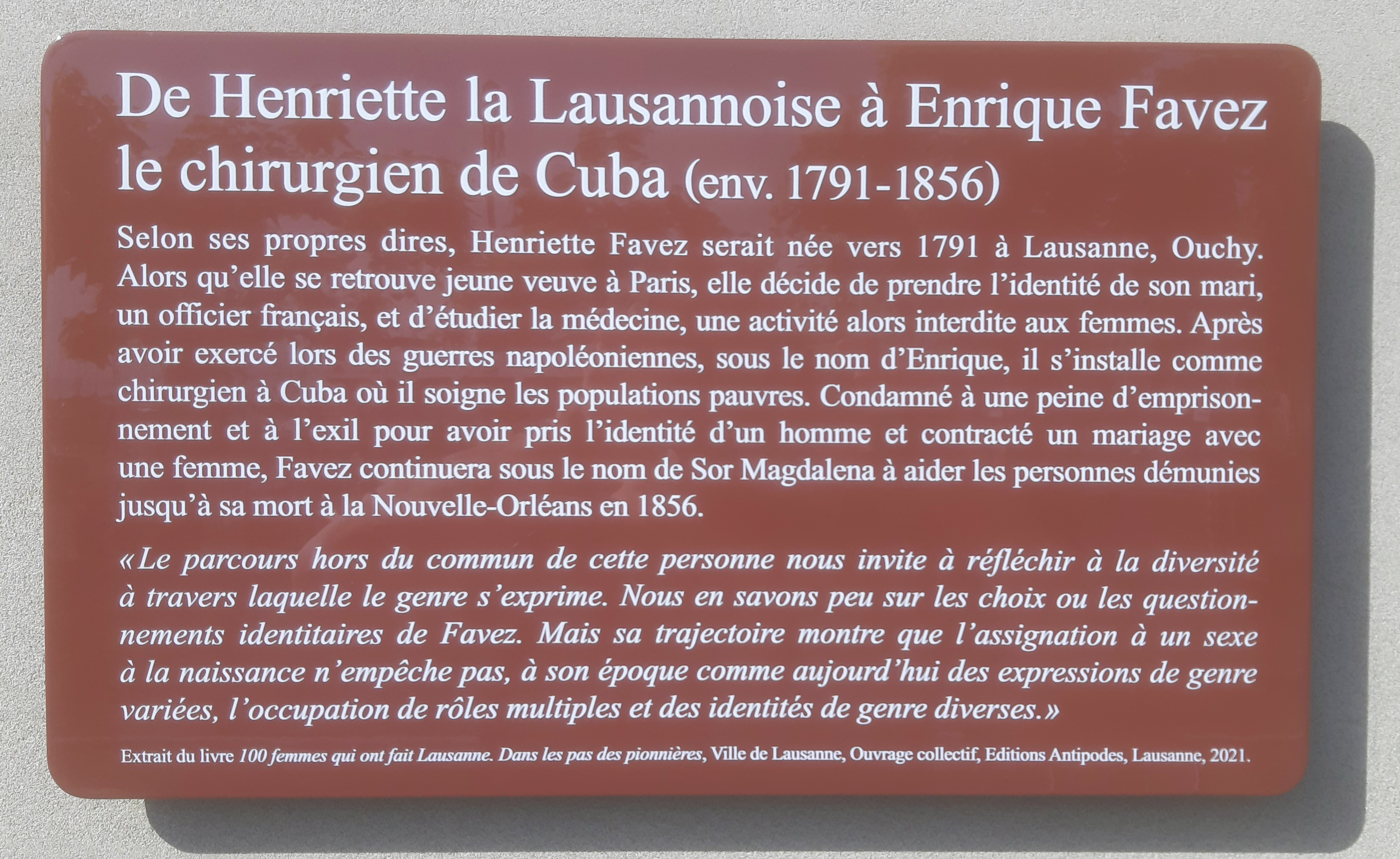
Enrique (Henriette) Favez commemoration plate in Lausanne 2022

Favez's story is documented in several books, including For Dressing Like a Man by Cuban historian Julio Cesar Gonzáles Pagés, whose publication was supported by the Swiss Agency for Development and Cooperation. The present article is based on documentary evidence and news digests of that book. Pagés, though referring to Favez as a woman confronting the challenges of her time and Favez's marriage as a lesbian one, also raised the possibility in an interview that Favez may have been a trans man.

The life of Favez is also the subject of a 2005 documentary film by director Lídice Pérez (see Favez at IMDb) and a theatre play by the group Rita Montaner. In 2018, the Cuban-Swiss film Insumisas was released, with Sylvie Testud in the role of Enriqueta Favez.

== See also ==
- James Barry (surgeon)
