= Juan Nepomuceno Rencoret =

Chilean doctor

Juan Nepomuceno Rencoret (1856-?) was a Chilean medical doctor.

He was born in Nancagua, a village in the department of San Fernando, Colchagua, Chile, in late 1856. He made his first studies of humanities at the Liceo de San Fernando and ended at the Instituto Nacional and the University of Chile. He studied medical sciences and surgery at the former School of Medicine. Having been orphaned during his time as a student, he took time off to work, devoting himself to teaching in various schools in Santiago. He finally obtained his diploma of medicine and surgery in 1878. Established in Quillota in 1880, he worked as a doctor of vaccines there, and in 1885 was elected alderman (regidor) of the Municipality. In 1886, he was elected the city's second vice mayor. At the end of the War of the Pacific, in 1881, he gave free care to wounded soldiers returning from the battles of Chorrillos and Miraflores.
