= Nationality Rooms =

Group of classrooms in the University of Pittsburgh's Cathedral of Learning

- U.S. National Register of Historic Places
- U.S. Historic district – Contributing property
- City of Pittsburgh Historic Structure
- Pittsburgh Landmark – PHLF
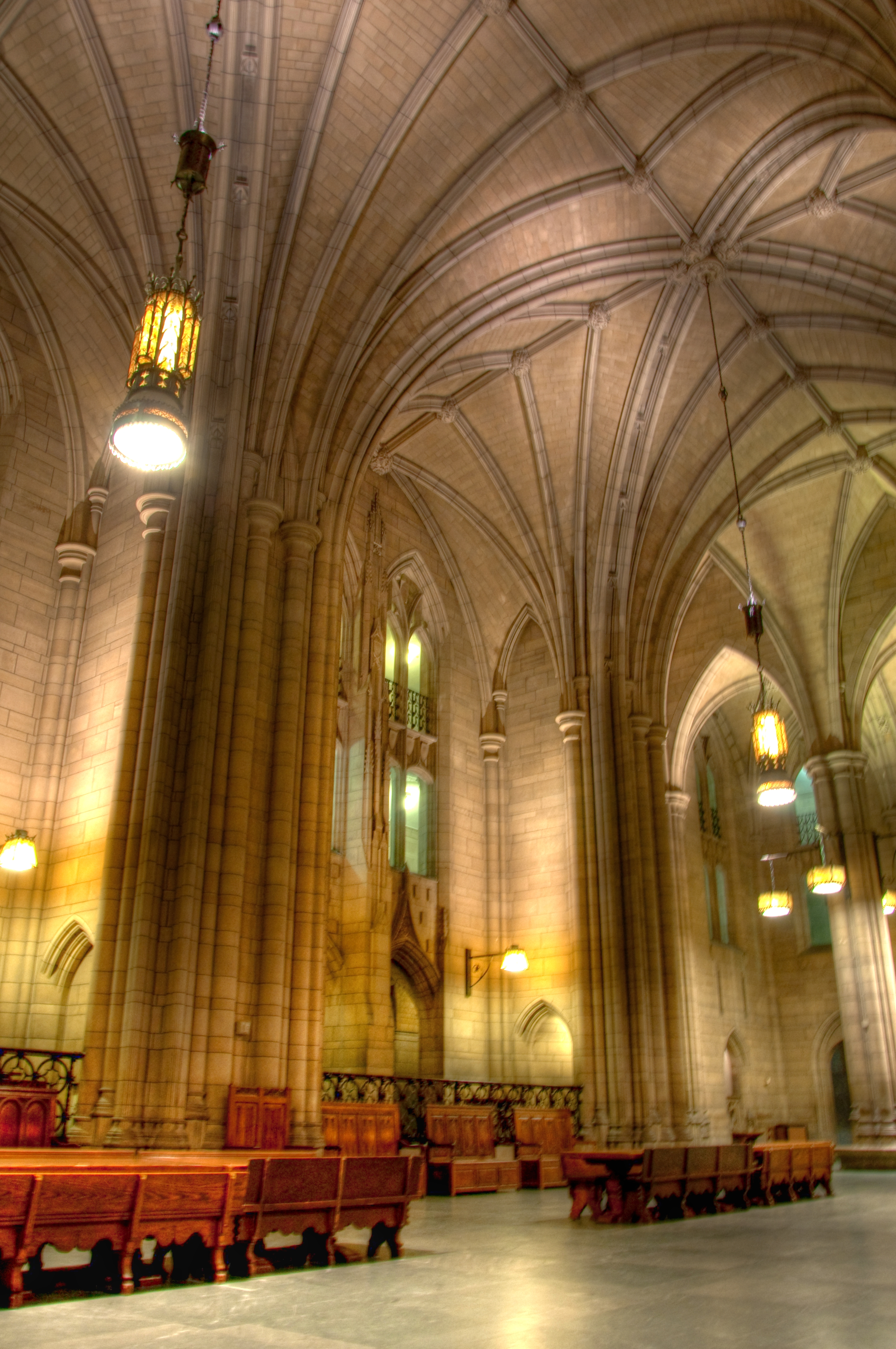
- Rooms ring the three-story Gothic hall, named the Commons Room, in the Cathedral of Learning

- Location within Pennsylvania
- Location: 4200 Fifth Ave, Pittsburgh, Pennsylvania 15260, USA
- Coordinates: 40°26′39″N 79°57′11″W
- Built: Cathedral of Learning 1926; Nationality Rooms 1938–present
- Architect: various
- Architectural style: various, 18th century or earlier
- Part of: Cathedral of Learning as part of the Schenley Farms Historic District (ID83002213)
- NRHP reference No.: 75001608

Significant dates
- Added to NRHP: November 3, 1975
- Designated CP: Cathedral of Learning: July 22, 1983
- Designated CPHS: Cathedral of Learning: February 22, 1977
- Designated PHLF: 1972: Cathedral of Learning interiors

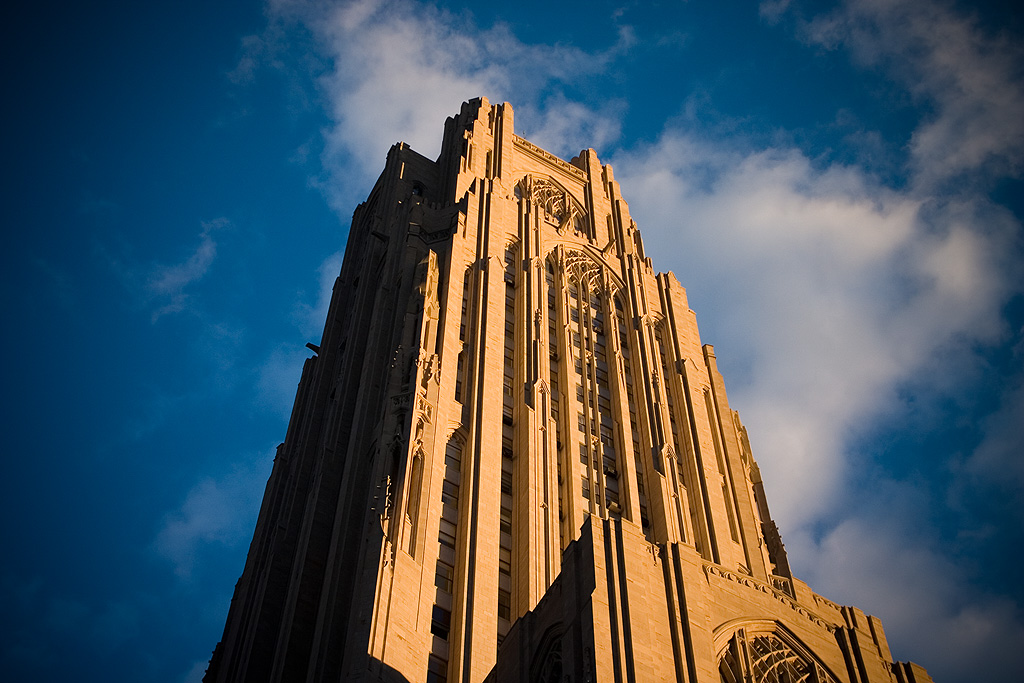
The University of Pittsburgh's 42-story Cathedral of Learning is home to the Nationality Rooms.

The Nationality Rooms are a group of 31 classrooms in the University of Pittsburgh's Cathedral of Learning depicting and donated by the national and ethnic groups that helped build the city of Pittsburgh. The rooms are designated as a Pittsburgh History and Landmarks Foundation historical landmark and are located on the 1st and 3rd floors of the Cathedral of Learning, itself a national historic landmark, on the University of Pittsburgh's main campus in the Oakland neighborhood of Pittsburgh, Pennsylvania, United States. Although of museum caliber, 29 of the 31 rooms are used as daily classrooms by University of Pittsburgh faculty and students, while the other two (the Early American and Syrian-Lebanon) are display rooms viewed through glass doors, utilized primarily for special events, and can only be explored via special guided tour. The Nationality Rooms also serve in a vigorous program of intercultural involvement and exchange in which the original organizing committees for the rooms remain as participants and which includes a program of annual student scholarship to facilitate study abroad. In addition, the Nationality Rooms inspire lectures, seminars, concerts exhibitions, and social events which focus on the various heritages and traditions of the nations represented. The national, traditional, and religious holidays of the nations represented are celebrated on campus and the rooms are appropriately decorated to reflect these occasions. The Nationality Rooms are available daily for public tours as long as the particular room is not being used for a class or other university function.

== History ==
The Nationality Room Program was founded by Ruth Crawford Mitchell at the request of Pitt Chancellor John Bowman in 1926, in order to involve the community in constructing the Cathedral of Learning and to provide the spiritual and symbolic foundation of the Cathedral that would make the inside of the building as inspiring and impressive as the outside. Under Mitchell's direction, invitations were extended to national communities in the Pittsburgh area to sponsor a room that was representative of their heritage. Each group formed a Room Committee responsible for fundraising, designing, and acquisition. The university provided the room and upkeep in perpetuity once completed, while all other materials, labor, and design were provided by the individual committees. These were sometimes partly provided for by foreign governments which, "...responded with generous support, often providing architects, artists, materials, and monetary gifts to assure authenticity and superb quality in their classrooms." Each room is carefully designed and executed down to the switch plates, door handles, hinges, and wastebaskets. The work is often performed and designed by native artists and craftsmen and involves imported artifacts and materials. Mitchell remained Director of the Nationality Rooms program until 1956, having overseen the creation of the first 19 rooms on the first floor of the cathedral. A successor to Mitchell wasn't named until 1965 when E. Maxine Bruhns took over the program, overseeing the completion of twelve additional rooms on the third floor. Bruhns retired on Jan. 1, 2020, after 54 years in the position, and died in July 2020.

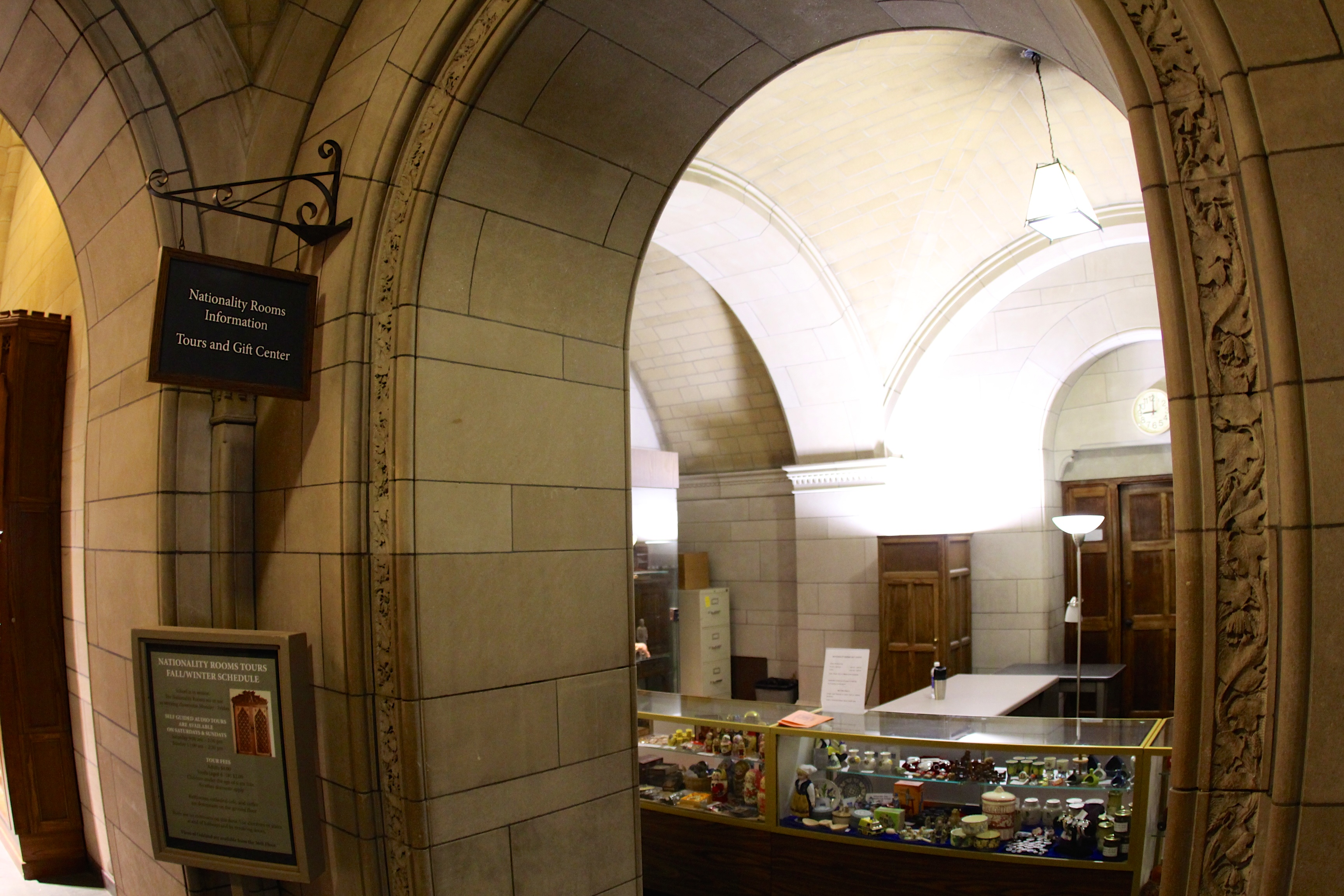
The Nationality Rooms Information, tours, and gift shop center just off the Commons Room

A typical room on the 1st floor built between 1938 and 1957 took between three and ten years to complete, and would have cost the equivalent of $479,119 today, which was no small undertaking, especially considering that the fundraising and construction of the initial rooms took place during the Great Depression and World War II. More recent rooms have cost in the range of US$750,000 and up, and took up to ten years to complete. Upon completion of their rooms, the committees turn to a program of intercultural exchange and fundraising for nationality rooms scholarships which enable University of Pittsburgh students and faculty to study abroad. The room committees also sponsor cultural and fundraising events, lectures, concerts, exhibits, social events, and workshops on ethnic studies that may utilize the rooms. The committee may use its room for non-political meetings, lectures, or other functions if no classes are scheduled. Distinguished international visitors are received by the committees, and special projects are undertaken including the purchase of books for the University libraries, publication of volumes on topics from comparative literature to ethnic recipes, and the fostering of courses in the mother languages. National, traditional, and religious holidays are celebrated on campus, and committees decorate their rooms or mount displays to commemorate special occasions.

The first four rooms to be dedicated were the Scottish, Russian, German, and Swedish Rooms in 1938." The newest rooms are the Turkish and Swiss rooms, both dedicated in 2012, the Korean room dedicated in 2015, and the Philippine Room dedicated in 2019.

Original plans also proposed, in addition to the Nationality Rooms on the first floor, the creation of "Pennsylvania" classrooms on the second floor to be dedicated to the pioneering groups within the state along with third floor "Pittsburgh" classrooms dedicated to showcasing the history of the Western Pennsylvania or different eras of American history. Although the plans for the series of rooms were drawn up, only one room was installed, the Early American Classroom, which is now counted among the other Nationality Rooms. The plans for the other Pittsburgh and Pennsylvania rooms were never executed, and the Nationality Room program grew to occupy all of the first and much of the third floor.

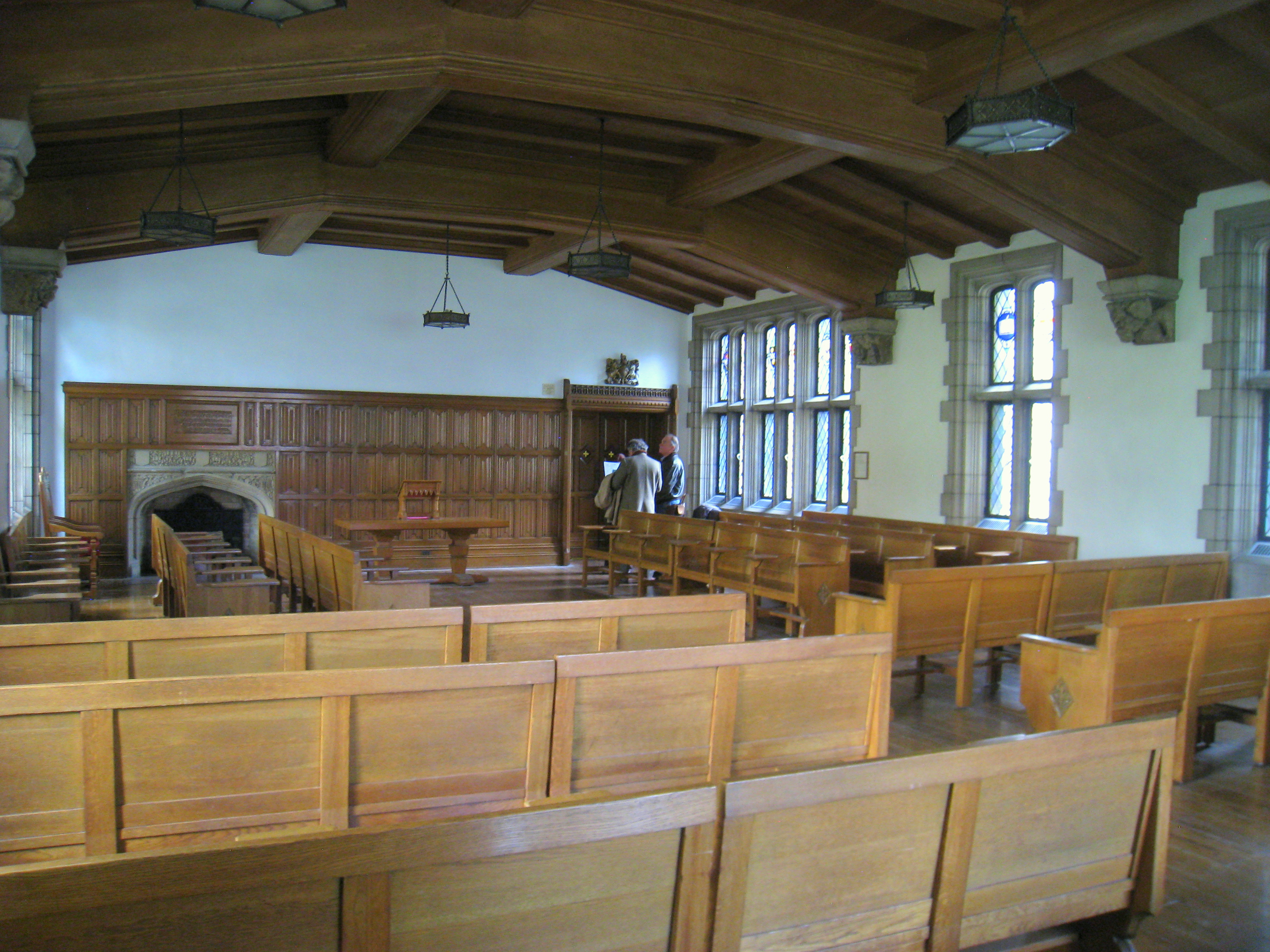
The English Classroom, the largest of the 31 Nationality Rooms, contains several artifacts from the original second House of Commons

Upon completion of a room, a dedication ceremony is held with a formal presentation of a ceremonial key to the university's Chancellor to symbolize the bestowal and acceptance of the gift, and a commitment by the university to maintain the room in perpetuity. The nationality room committee officers then become members of the Nationality Council which provides scholarships for summer study abroad for Pitt students, along with other non-political cultural or educational events within the Nationality Program's scope. Today, the cathedral is home to 31 Nationality Rooms (29 working classrooms and two display rooms: the Early American Room and the Syrian-Lebanon Room), on the first and third floors. Each nationality room celebrates a different culture that influenced Pittsburgh's growth, depicting an era prior to 1787, the university's founding and the signing of the United States Constitution. Only one room does not follow this convention, with the French Classroom depicting the First French Empire of the early 19th century. An additional room, the Finnish national room, is currently under construction.

Set in the Cathedral of Learning's cornerstone in 1937 is a gift from the Nationality Room Committee chairpersons to the university: a copper plate engraved with these thoughts:

Faith and peace are in their hearts. Good will has brought them together. Like the Magi of ancestral traditions and the shepherds of candid simplicity, they offer their gifts of what is precious, genuine and their own, to truth that shines forever and enlightens all people.

Since 1944, tours of the nationality rooms have been given to visitors by a Pitt student organization, Quo Vadis (Latin: Where do you go?), that guides over 40,000 tourists a year. With reservations, specially themed tours based on creature symbolism, images of royalty, and folktales are also given. An estimated 100,000 visitors, including self-guided and walk-in tourists, visit the Nationality Rooms each year.

== Principles ==
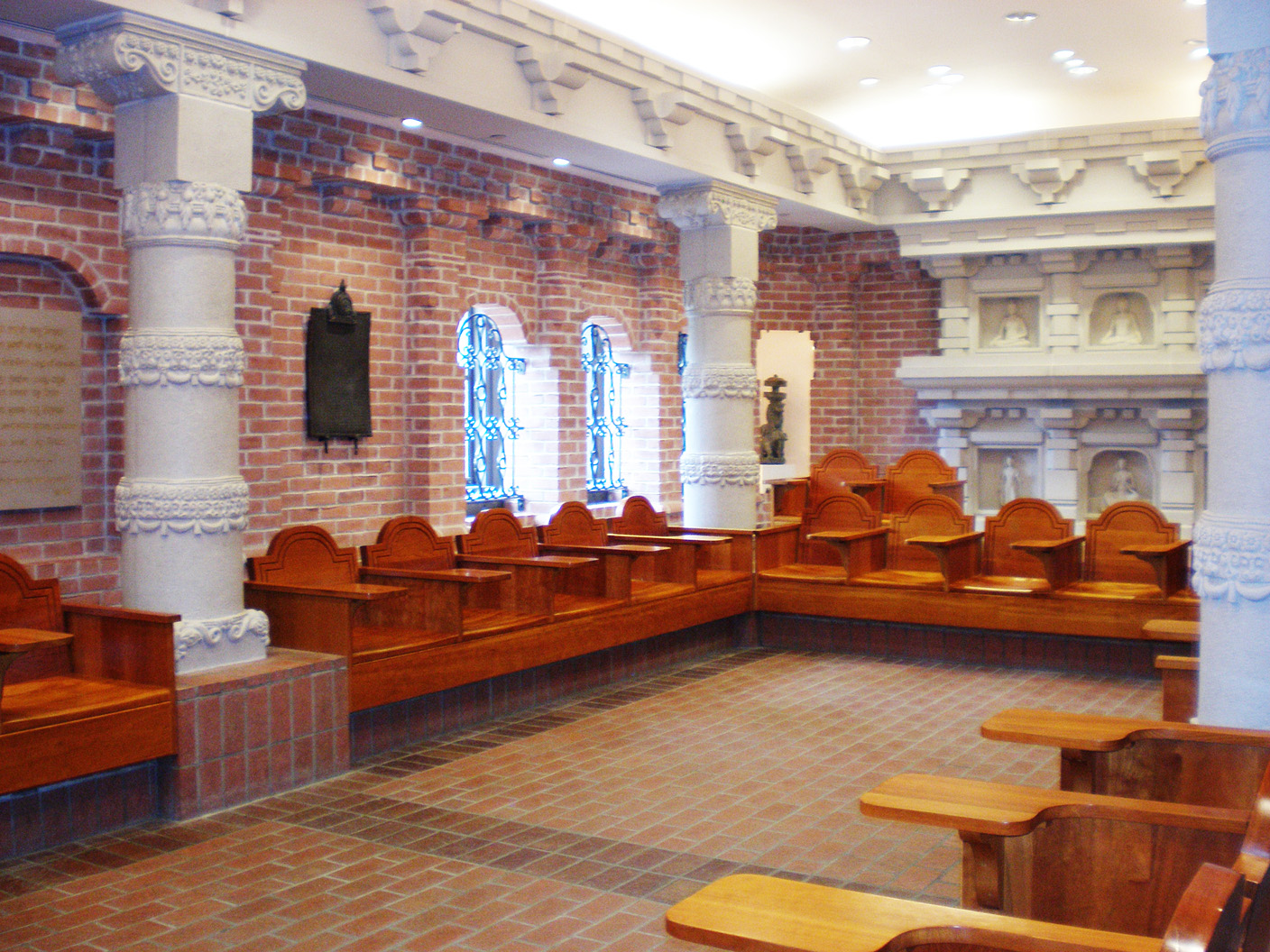
The Indian Classroom, opened in 2000, is one of the newer Nationality Rooms that continue to be installed on the third floor

The following principles, in order to assure commonality of purpose, authenticity, and non-political cultural emphasis, governed the creation of nationality rooms from the programs inception in 1926 until the completion of the Irish Classroom in 1957.

- A Nationality Room must illustrate one of the outstanding architectural or design traditions of a nation that is recognized as such by the United States Department of State.
- The design of a given historical period must be cultural and aesthetic, not political. The period depicted should be prior to 1787, the year the university was founded.
- To avoid political implications in the room, no political symbol is permitted in the decorations, nor a portrait or likeness of any living person.
- The only place a political symbol may be used is in the corridor stone above the room's entrance.
- No donor recognition may appear in the rooms. Donor recognition to the rooms is recorded in a Donor Book.
- Most architects and designers of the rooms have been born and educated abroad. This has been instrumental in ensuring authenticity of design.

In the 1970s, policy revisions were implemented which retaining most of the earlier principles, utilized a broader definition of nation to include a body of people associated with a particular territory and possessing a distinctive cultural and social way of life. This allowed the creation of the Armenian and Ukrainian rooms prior to their establishment as independent nations following the collapse of the Soviet Union, as well as allowing for the installation of the African Heritage Room.

The room must also be a functional teaching classroom with enough student tablet-armed seats, professor's lectern or table, adequate sight lines and lighting, modern audiovisual technology, and other necessities of a classroom. New rooms also have narrated tour equipment. Materials are to remain authentic and durable that are executed through architectural form and not mere surface embellishment and are to provide eternal qualities that have the potential to "teach" about the cultures with appropriate non-political symbols and artifacts.

== Classrooms ==
=== African Heritage ===
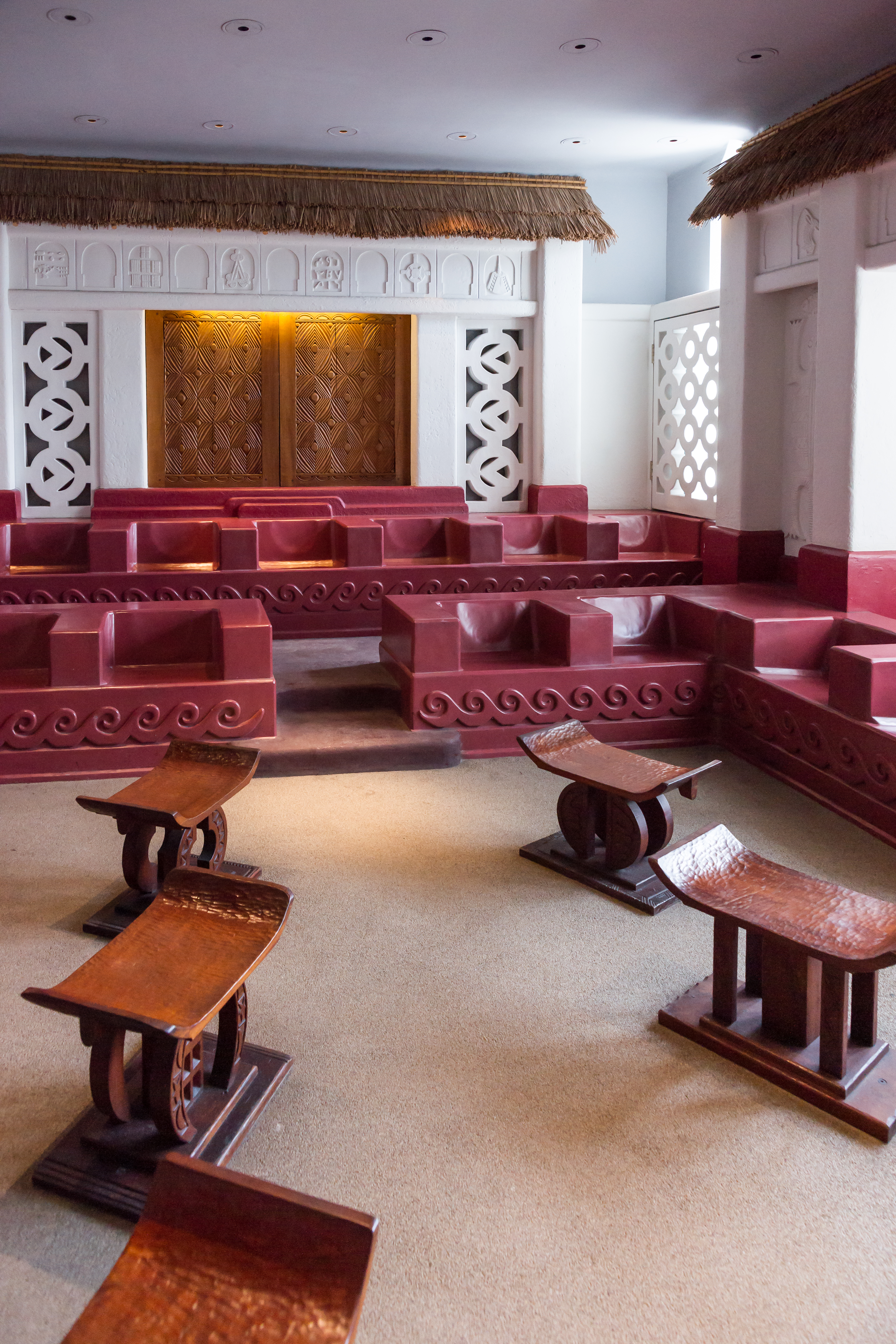
The African Heritage Classroom

African Heritage Classroom
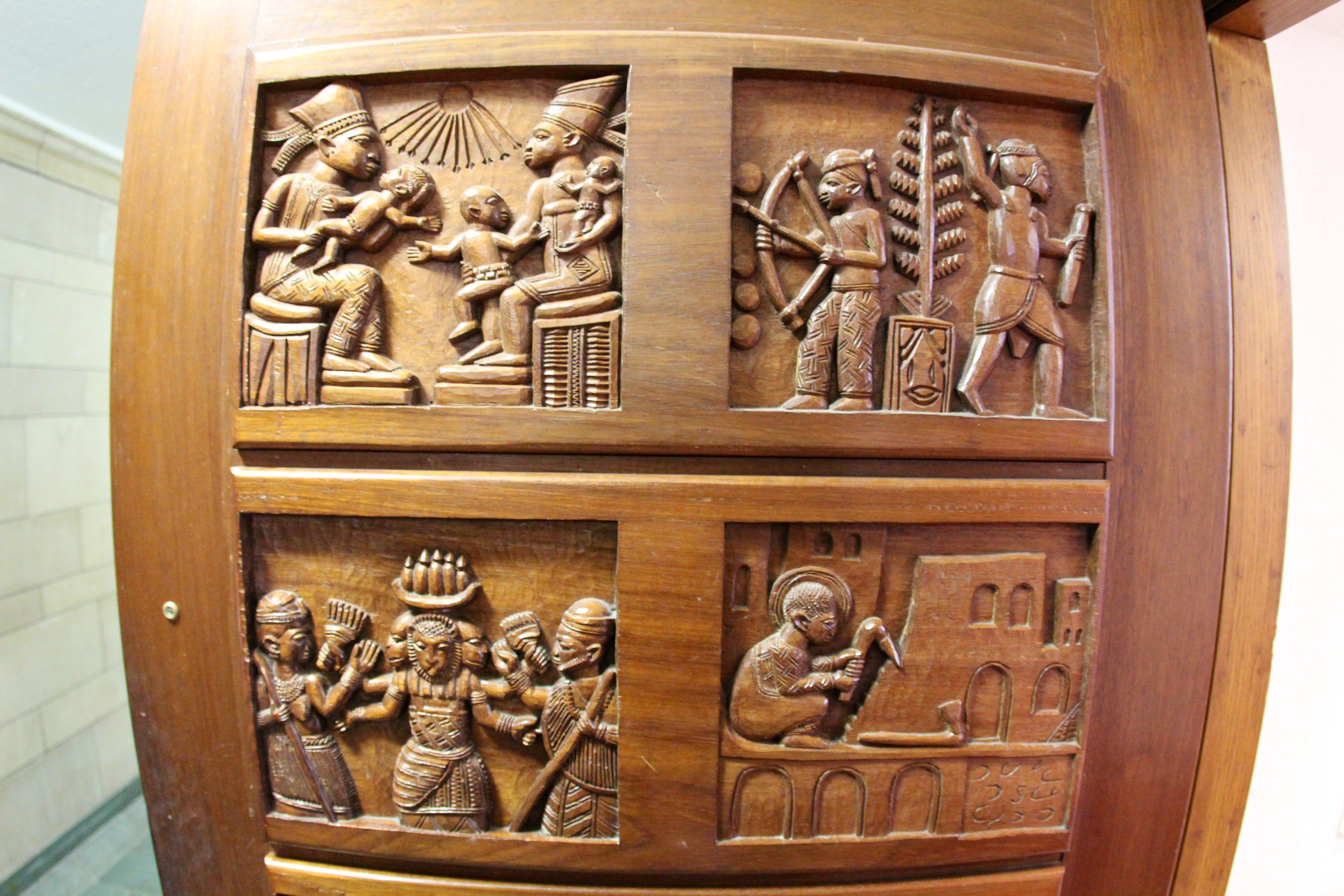
- Location: Room 330
- Dedicated: December 17, 1989
- Concept: Dr. Laurence Glasco
- Style: 18th century Asante Temple
- Architect: William J. Bates, A.I.A.

The African Heritage Classroom was designed to reflect an 18th-century Asante temple courtyard in Ghana which would provide the setting for ceremonial events, learning, and worship. The classroom represents the entire continent of Africa with Yoruba-style door carvings by Nigerian sculptor Lamidi O. Fakeye depicting ancient kingdoms of Africa including Egypt, Nubia, Ethiopia, Benin, Kongo/Angola, Kuba, Mali, and Zimbabwe. Plaster forms in the frieze represent the arts, music, science, languages, and literature of Africa. A display case housing artifacts from various African nations and the chalkboard area reflect patos around the courtyard. Below the chalkboard doors depicting the Igbo lozenge and star motif are Sankofa birds which symbolize the need to learn from the past in order to prepare for the future. The oxblood steps, two levels of student benches, and wainscot with relief decorations suggest the polished clay of an Asante temple. Openwork screens are present on the windows as they are used in Asante structures to filter the sun's rays while allowing air flow. Six chieftain stools provide informal seating near a hand-carved professor's lectern.

=== Armenian ===
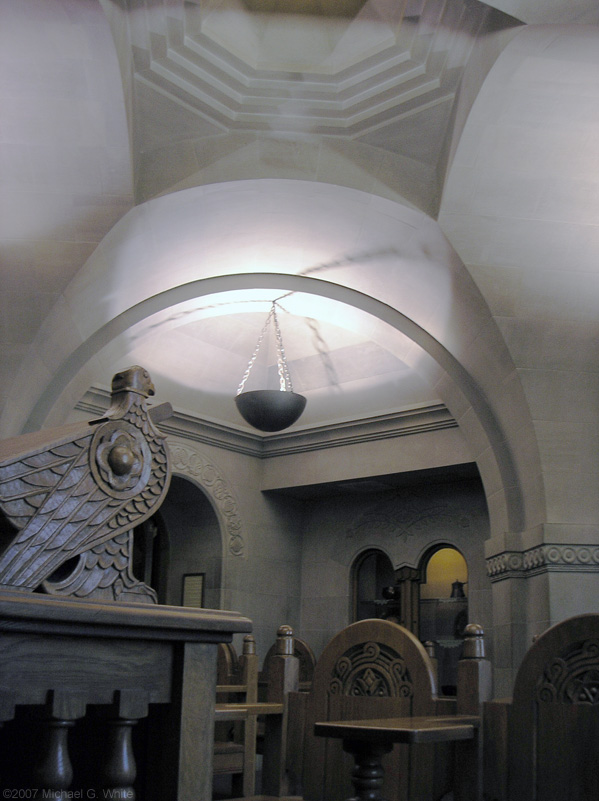
The Armenian Classroom

Armenian Classroom
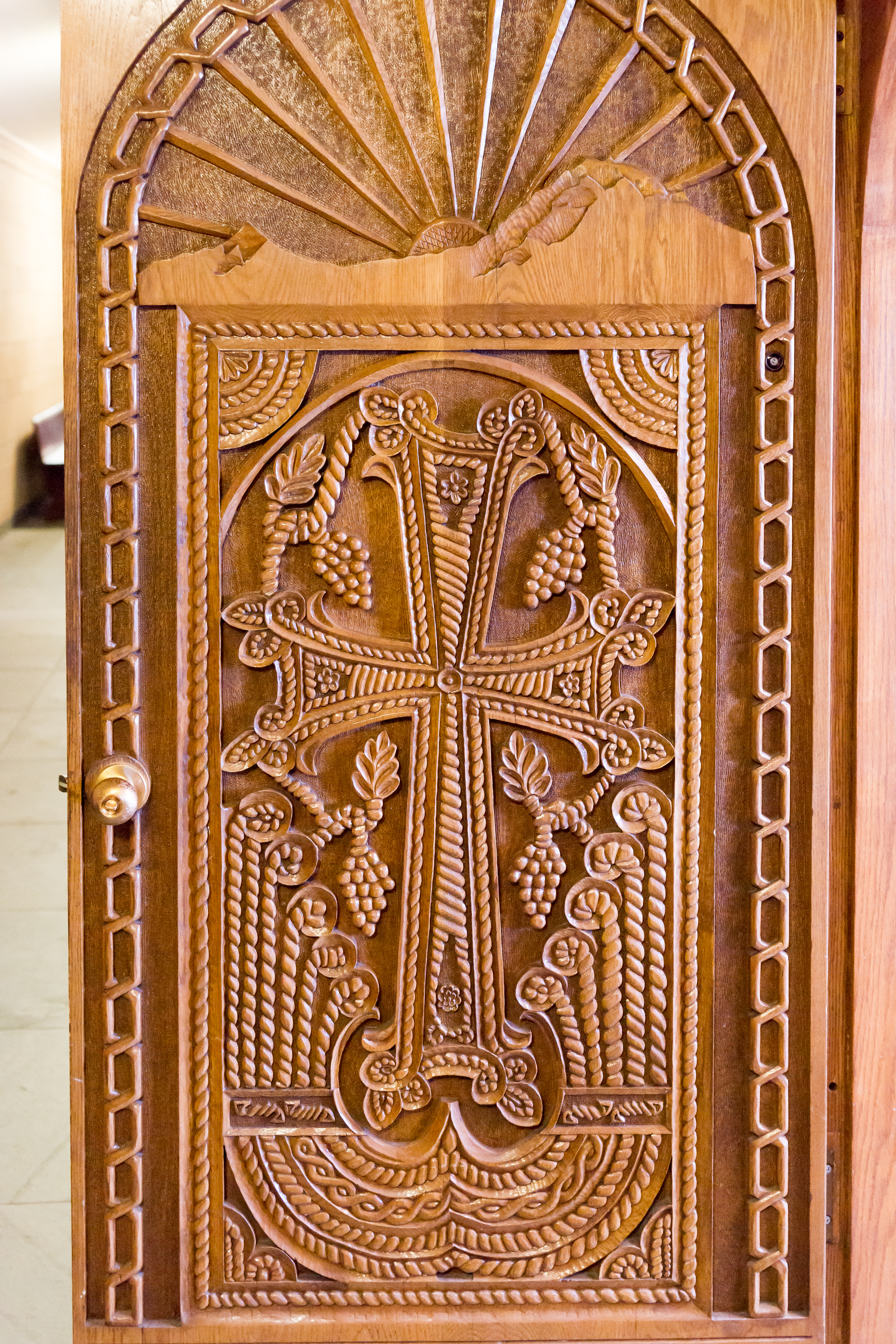
- Location: Room 319
- Dedicated: August 28, 1988
- Style: 10th–12th century Monastic
- Architect: Torkom Khrimian

The Armenian Classroom was inspired by the 10th- to 12th-century Sanahin Monastery. The design consists of intersecting arches and a domed ceiling built to lessen damage from frequent earthquakes in that country. The room's arches, built of Indiana limestone, make this the heaviest of the Nationality Rooms, weighing 22 tons, and required the second floor beneath the room to be reinforced in order to support its weight. The cornerstone is a basalt stone from the grounds of Sanahin. In the mortar behind it are the thumbprints of five of the oldest Armenian diaspora living in the Pittsburgh area, as well as the handprint of an infant of Armenian descent, symbolizing the continuity of the Armenian presence in western Pennsylvania.

=== Austrian ===
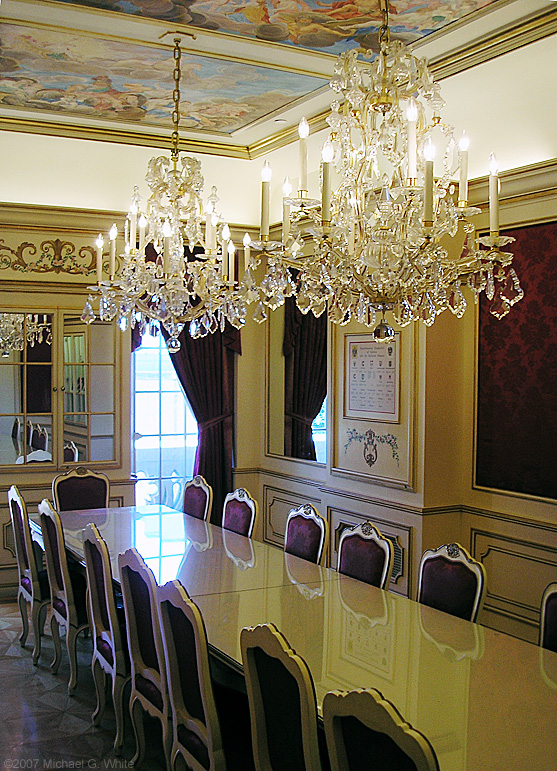
The Austrian Classroom

Austrian Classroom
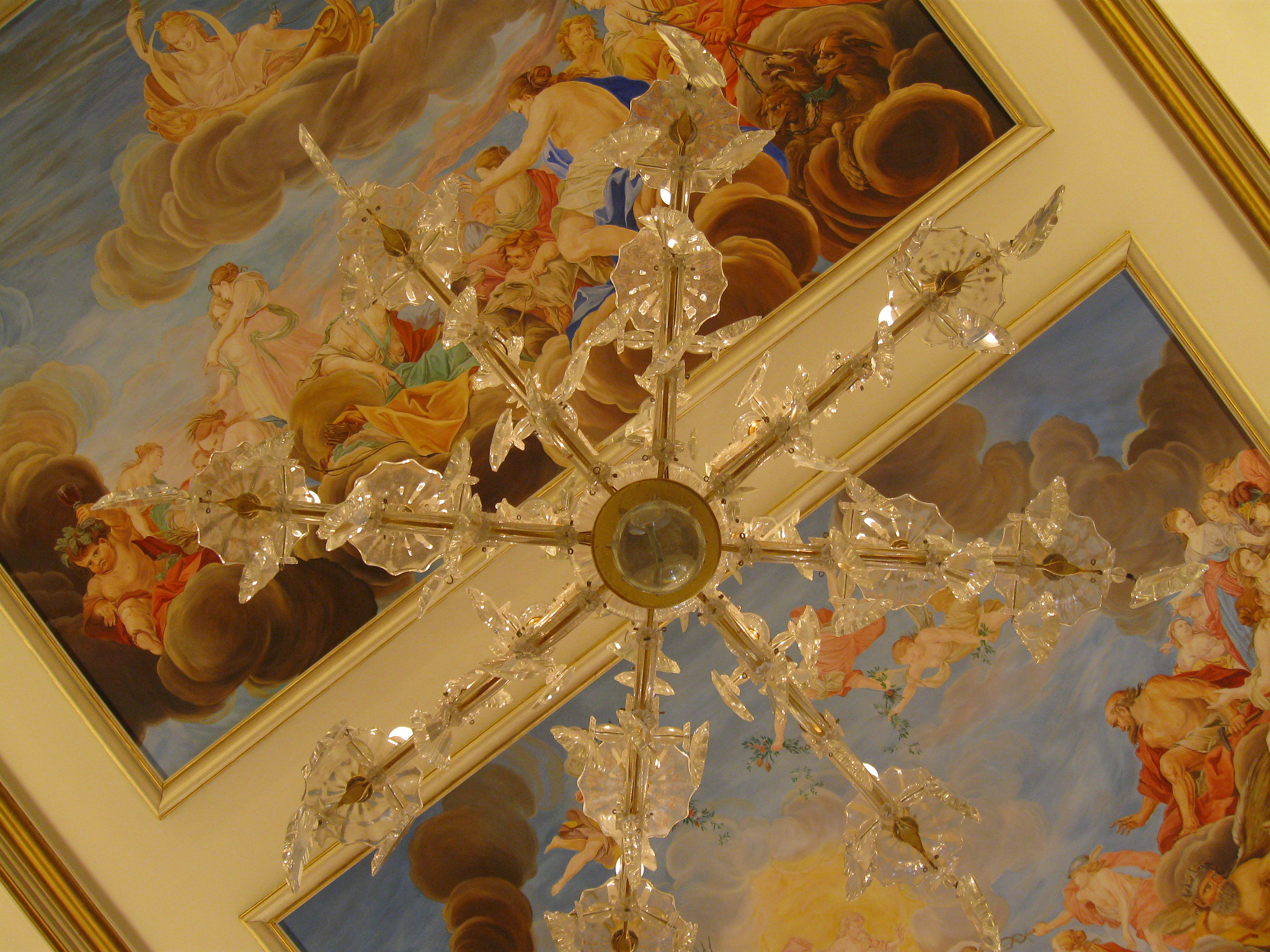
- Location: Room 314
- Dedicated: June 9, 1996
- Style: 17th–18th century Baroque
- Architects: Franz Gerhardt Schnögass, Vienna; Gunther J. Kaier, A.I.A. Pittsburgh

The Austrian Nationality Room represents the 18th-century era of the Austrian Empire during its age of enlightenment under Empress Maria Theresa and her son Joseph II and incorporates Baroque elements of the Haydnsaal in Schloss Esterházy at Eisenstadt where Joseph Haydn served as Kapellmeister from 1766 to 1778. Ceiling paintings depict scenes from Roman mythology similar to those in the Haydnsaal. The room features Lobmeyer crystal chandeliers, gilded white lacquer seminar furniture patterned after that in the formal dining hall of Vienna's Hofburg, royal red-tapestried walls, gold-leafed pilasters, and a parquet floor inlaid in a starburst design. Exhibits in the display cases in the room trace the development of the multinational Austrian Empire and the birthplaces of representative Austrian composers born within its borders between the years 1000 and 1918.

=== Chinese ===
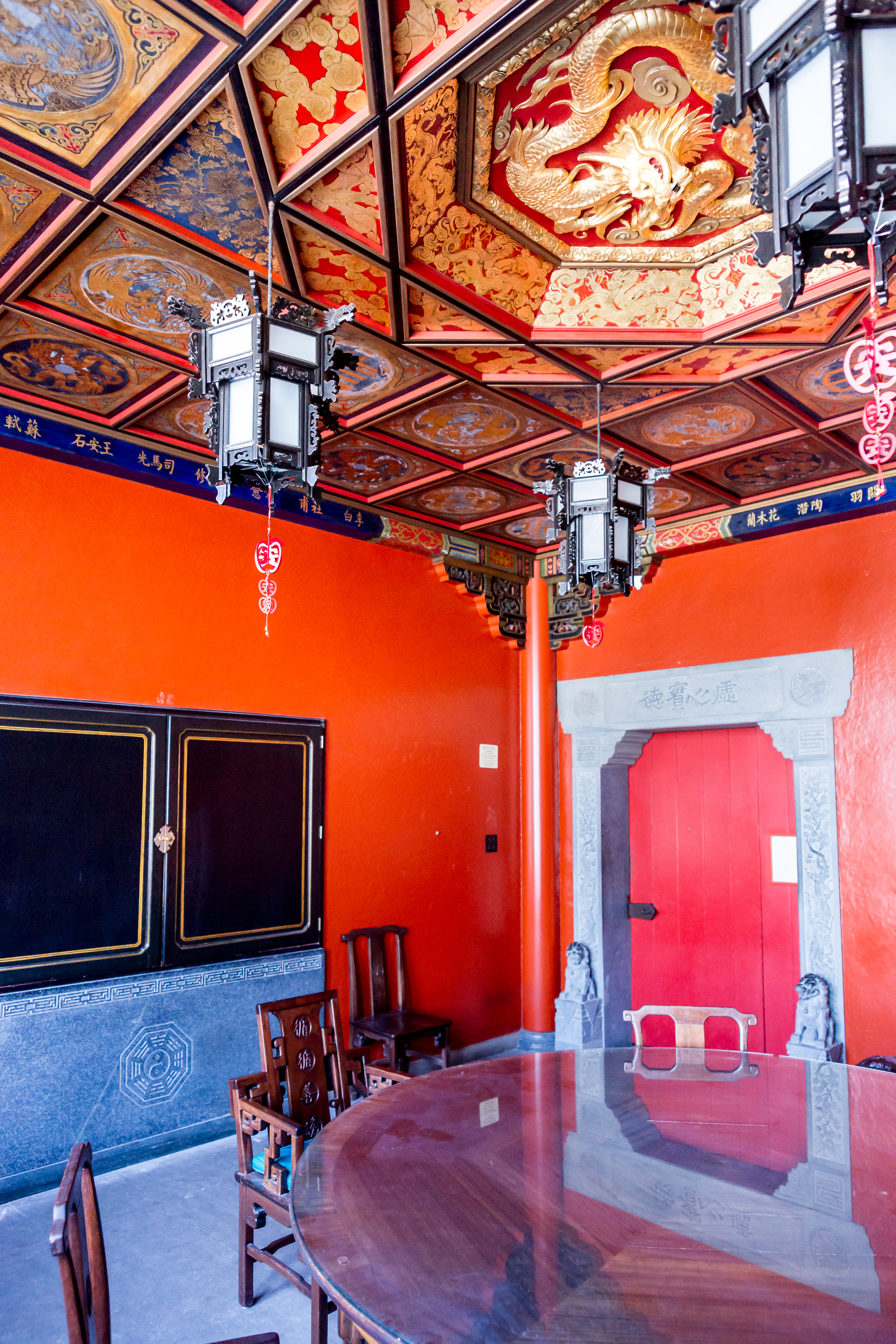
The Chinese Classroom

Chinese Classroom
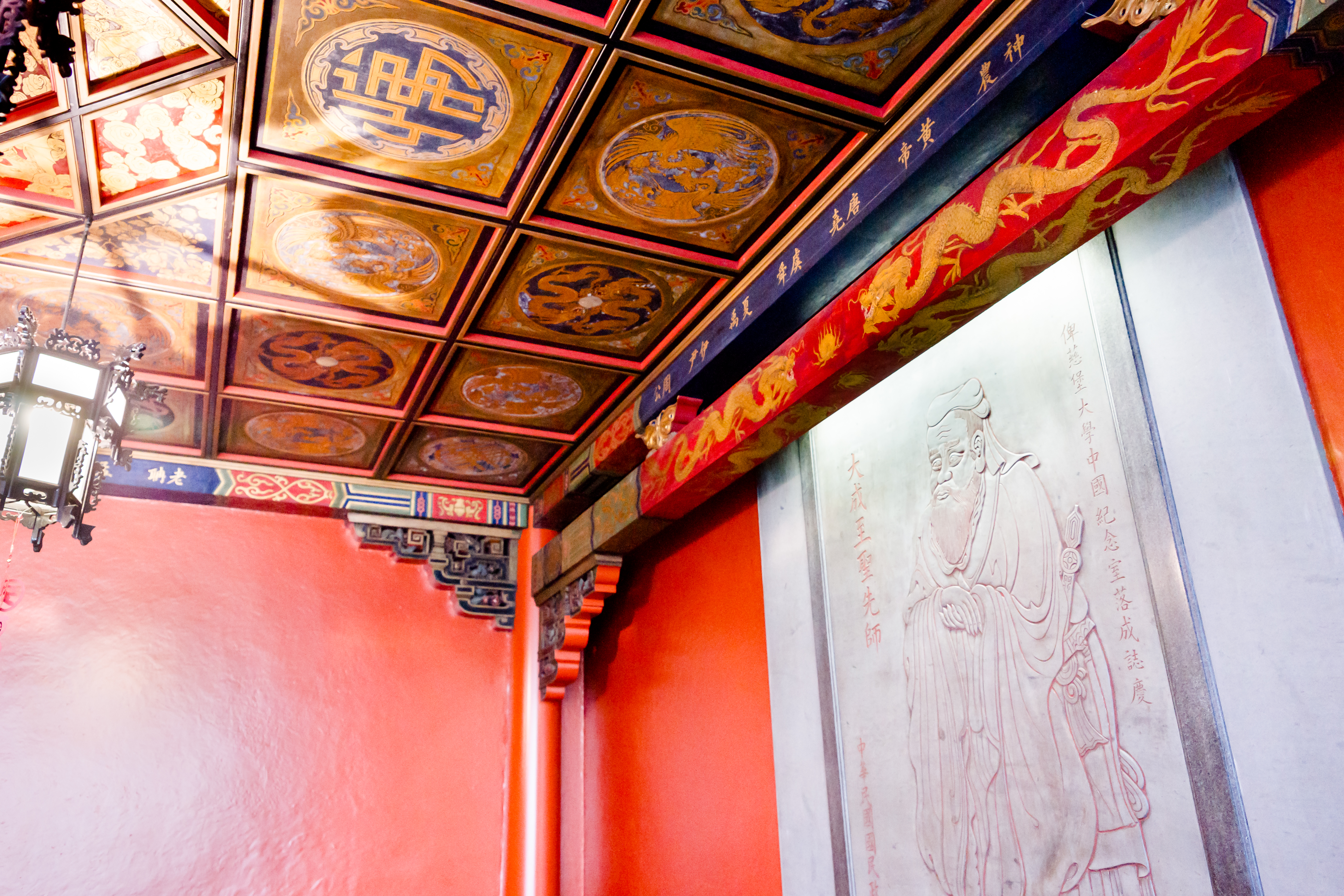
- Location: Room 136
- Dedicated: October 6, 1939
- Style: 18th-century Chinese Empire
- Designer: Teng Kwei, Beijing
- Architect: Henry Killiam Murphy

The idea for a Chinese classroom was brought forth by Chinese international students in 1929, who collaborated with local Chinese faculty, the leaders of Pittsburgh Chinatown, and the government of the Republic of China to secure funding to construct the classroom. Inaugural Treasurer Nellie Yot, the wife of then Chinatown "Mayor" Willie Yot, went door-to-door in Chicago, Cleveland, and Boston to raise additional funds in the mid-late 1930s. The Chinese Classroom is inspired by the design of a palace hall in Beijing's Forbidden City and is dedicated to the memory of Confucius and his democratic ideal of classless education. The teacher and students sit at the same level around a moon-shaped teakwood table. The professor's chair is carved with the admonition to "Teach by inspiring gradually and steadily". A slate portrait of Confucius is present that is patterned after one in the Confucian temple at his birthplace of Qufu in Shandong Province. Above the red lacquered door, Chinese characters are carved into the stone lintel that proclaim that "Humility of mind goes with loftiness of character." Stone lions flank the entrance before carvings of the plum blossom, the national flower of China. The ceiling contains a coiling golden five-clawed imperial dragon surrounded by clouds denoting nature's energy and freedom. Painted squares portray dragons guarding the pearl of wisdom and the phoenix with the motan flower, a symbol of cultural wealth. The opened blackboard doors reveal painted renditions of the babao, or Eight Treasures, popular in Chinese art. On the base below is a carved version of the Bagua which consists of eight trigrams surrounding the circular Yin and Yang. Windows consist of frosted glass with stylized cames.

=== Czechoslovak ===
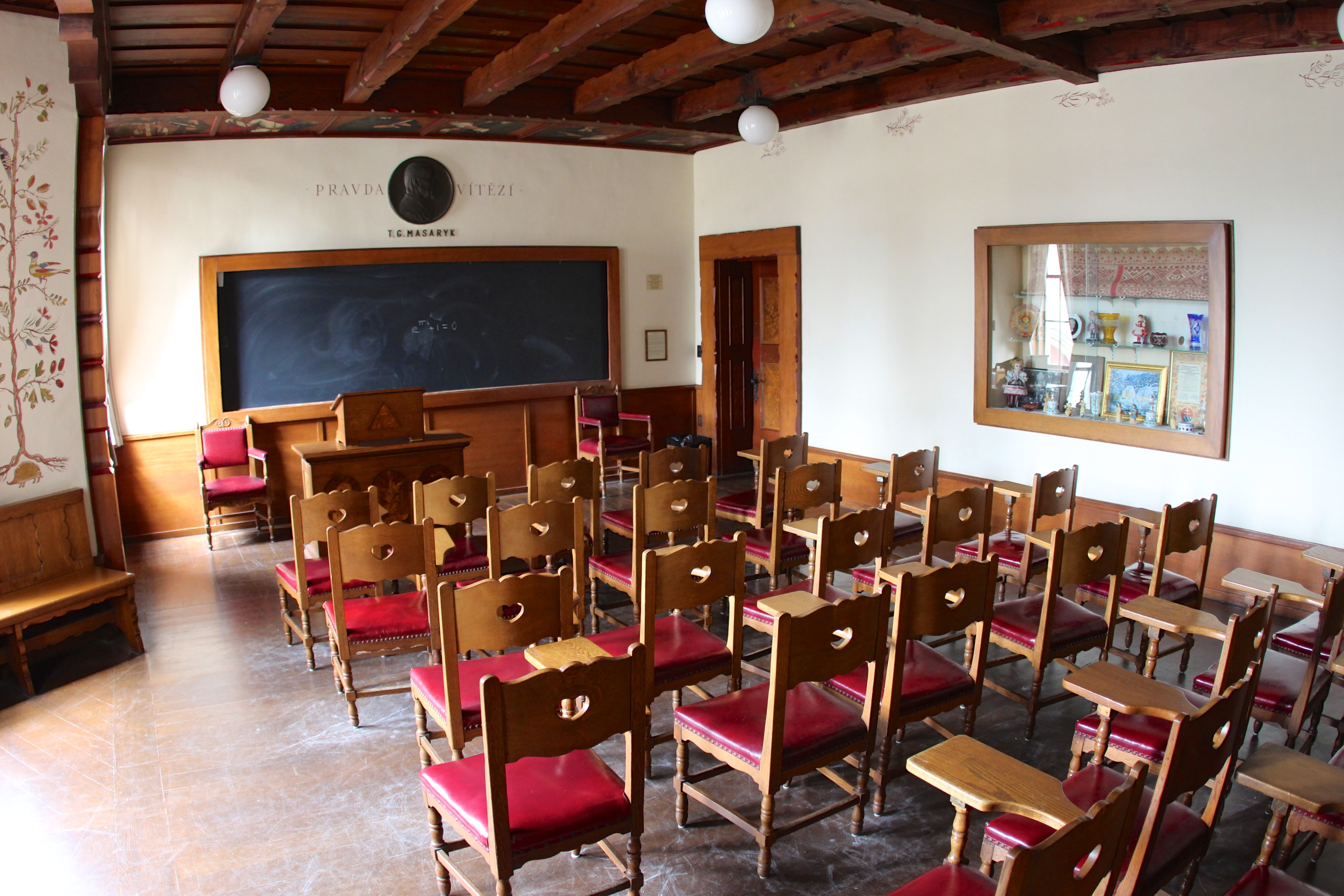
The Czechoslovak Classroom

Czechoslovak Classroom
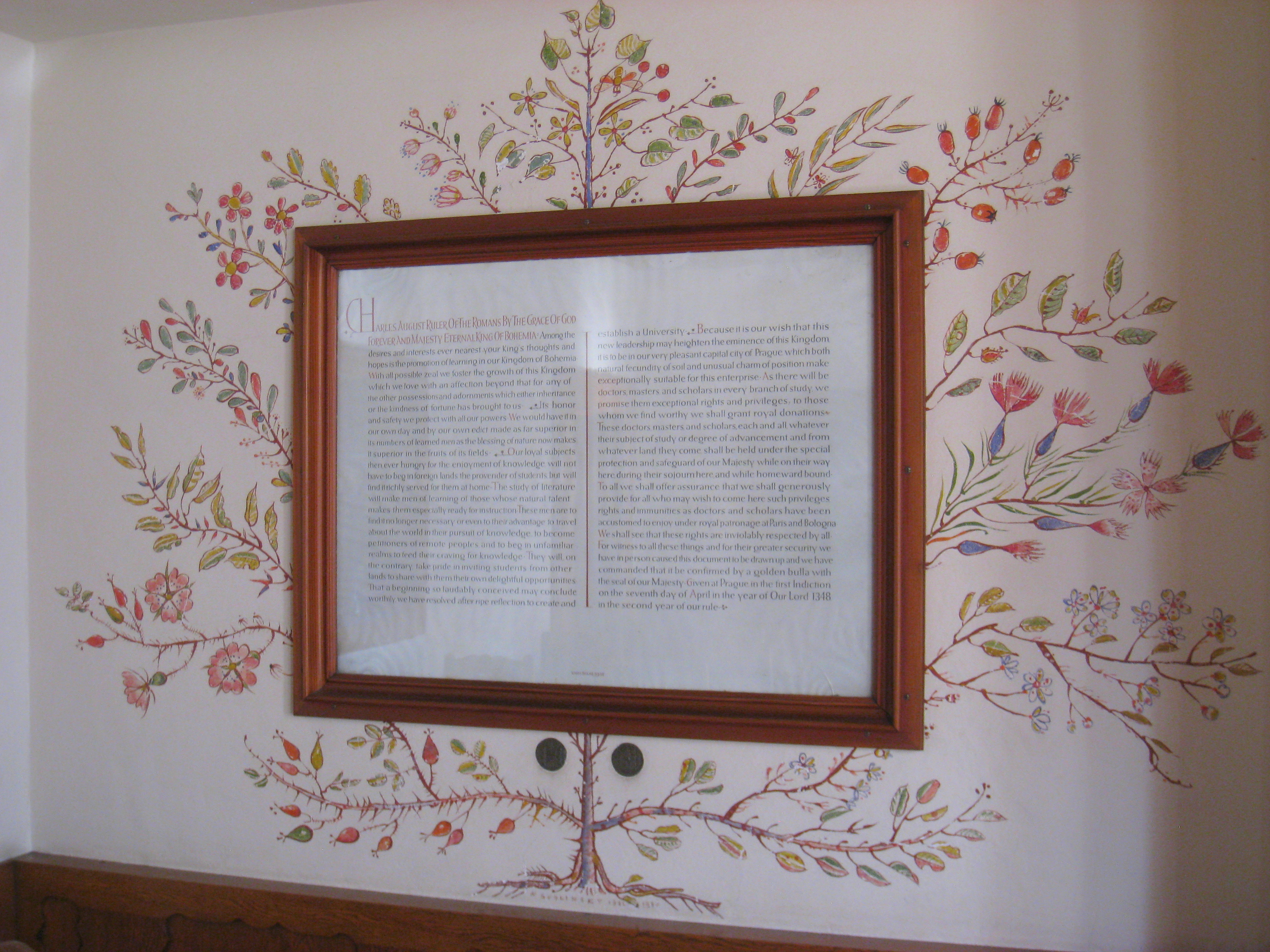
- Location: Room 113
- Dedicated: March 7, 1939
- Style: Folk Motif
- Architect: Dr. Bohumil Sláma, Prague

The Czechoslovak Classroom combines elements of a Slovak farmhouse, country church, and the Charles University in Prague while detailing men who contributed to Czechoslovak culture. The motto of the classroom, and of the former Czechoslovak government in exile, is proclaimed by the inscription of "Pravda Vítězí" which translates to "Truth Prevails" and surrounds a bronze relief portrait of the first President and founder of Czechoslovakia Tomáš Garrigue Masaryk. In a wrought-iron case near the window bay, a letter penned by the hand of Masaryk to students at the University of Pittsburgh recalls John Amos Comenius' belief that "education is the workshop of humanity". All woodwork, except the furniture, is made of larch wood which grows to great heights in the Carpathian Mountains. The ceiling, with flat boards overlapping each other between heavy beams, is painted by Prague artists Karel Svolinský and Marie Svolinská and depicts botanically accurate flowers and plants of Czechoslovakia and reflects a typical Slovak farmer's home and the style of country churches. A "tree of life" design on the rear wall surrounds the text of the proclamation by King of Bohemia and Emperor of the Holy Roman Empire Charles IV that marked the founding of the University of Prague in 1348. The plaster reveals of the bay window area is decorated by murals of miraculous trees bearing flowers and fruits and harboring animals, birds, and insects reflecting "peasant writings" and executed by the artists in freehand. Ceiling panels portray eight famous persons in Czech and Slovak history from the 9th through 19th centuries including Cyril and Methodius who created the Cyrillic script, Waclaw who was the "Good King Wenceslaus" of the Christmas Carol, Jan Hus who was a champion of Czech religious freedom, John Amos Comenius who is considered the father of modern education, Ján Kollár a Slovak poet who called for Slavic unity, Ľudovít Štúr who developed the Slovak literary language, and Bishop Stefan Moyzes who pioneered popular education in Slovakia. Intarsia done by V. Kopka of Moravia are found on the entrance door panels and the professor's desk and lectern which depicts university academic disciplines. Embroidery, lace, Bohemian crystal, and historical documents are displayed in the wall cabinet.

=== Early American ===
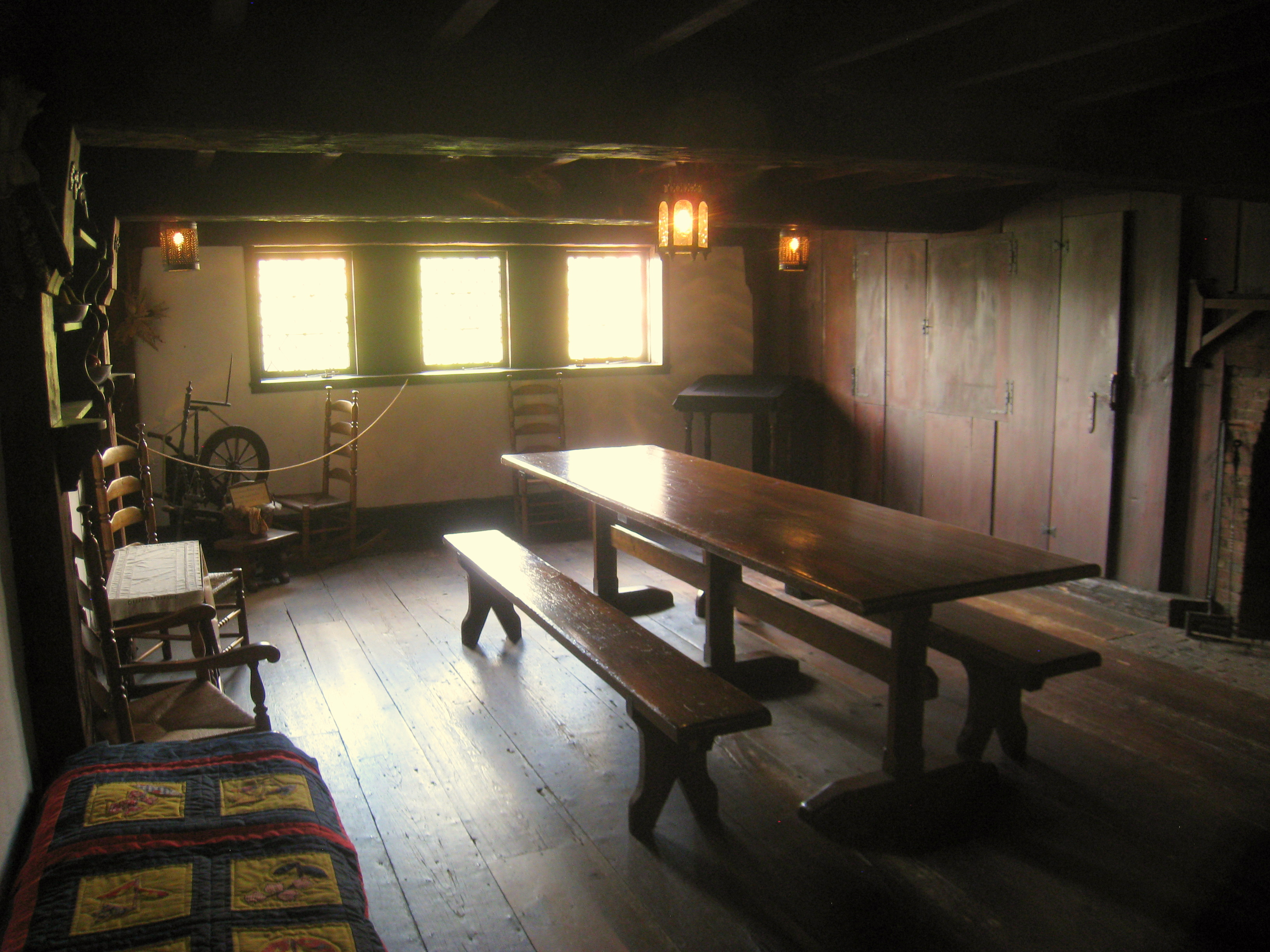
The Early American Classroom

Early American Room
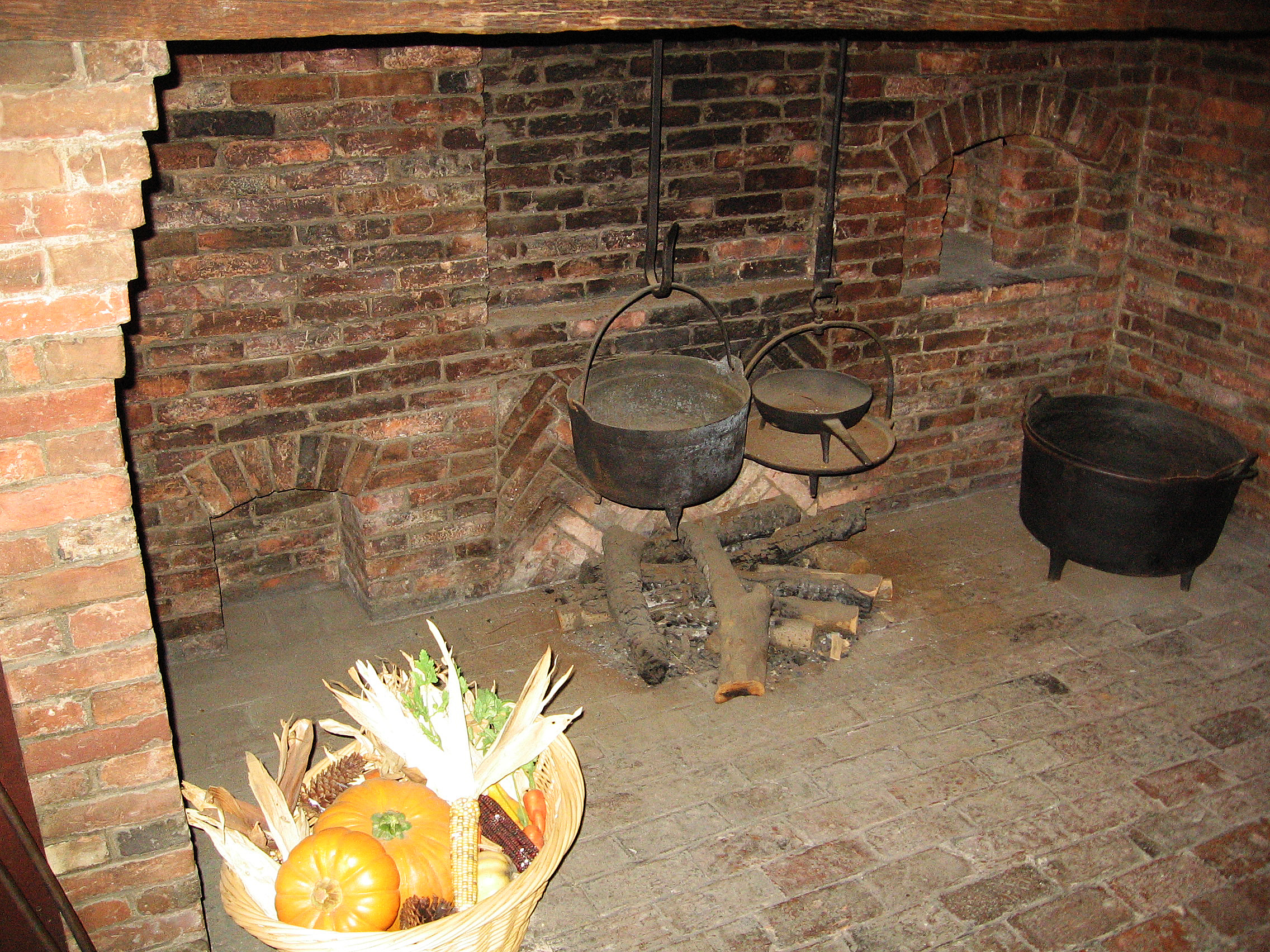
- Location: Room 328
- Presented: 1938
- Style: 17th century New England Colonial
- Architect: Theodore H. Bowman, A.I.A. Pittsburgh

The Early American Room is one of two display rooms not used as a functional classroom, although it is opened for guided tours. The room was commissioned by longtime University Pittsburgh trustee George Hubbard Clapp, a descendant nine generations removed from Roger Clapp, an English captain who sailed into the New England port of Hull on May 30, 1630. The kitchen-living room of the early colonists was chosen to portray the sturdy simplicity of life in America during the 1650s. The room's focus is a nine-foot fireplace constructed from 200-year-old handmade bricks with "fixings" of a log hook, heavy iron kettles, a spider, gridiron, longhandled waffle iron, bread shovel, skewers, ladles, and forks. A small recess in the brick wall served to bake bread. A tapered pole swings out from the end of the fireplace to be used for drying laundry or to hang a quilt to keep the cold draft from those gathered near the fire. Massive hand-hewn pine beams used in the seven-foot-high ceiling and the fireplace were collected after a careful search in Massachusetts. White pine is used for the heavy seminar table, benches, and chairs. Wrought-iron candelabra are hinged with clasps to hold lighting tapers. Other light fixtures are of specially designed pierced tin. The colonial-style windows were designed by glass artist Charles Connick. Decorative items include a collection of 17th- and 18th-century American coins, a working spinning wheel, and a hand-stitched sampler. The small closet between the blackboard and fireplace contains a secret panel and once the concealed latch is discovered, its release causes the wall to swing open, revealing a hidden staircase to the upper loft, which has been furnished as a 19th-century bedroom. Included in the bedroom is a four-poster rope bed and small cradle, both of which belonged to pianist and composer Ethelbert Nevin. The bedroom also includes several personal items, including an 1878 wedding quilt, which belonged to Waitman Worthington McDaniel and his wife Martha Jane Poe, the grandmother of Nationality Director Maxine Bruhns. The room is associated with various stories of unexplained incidents that have resulted in claims that the room is haunted.

=== English ===
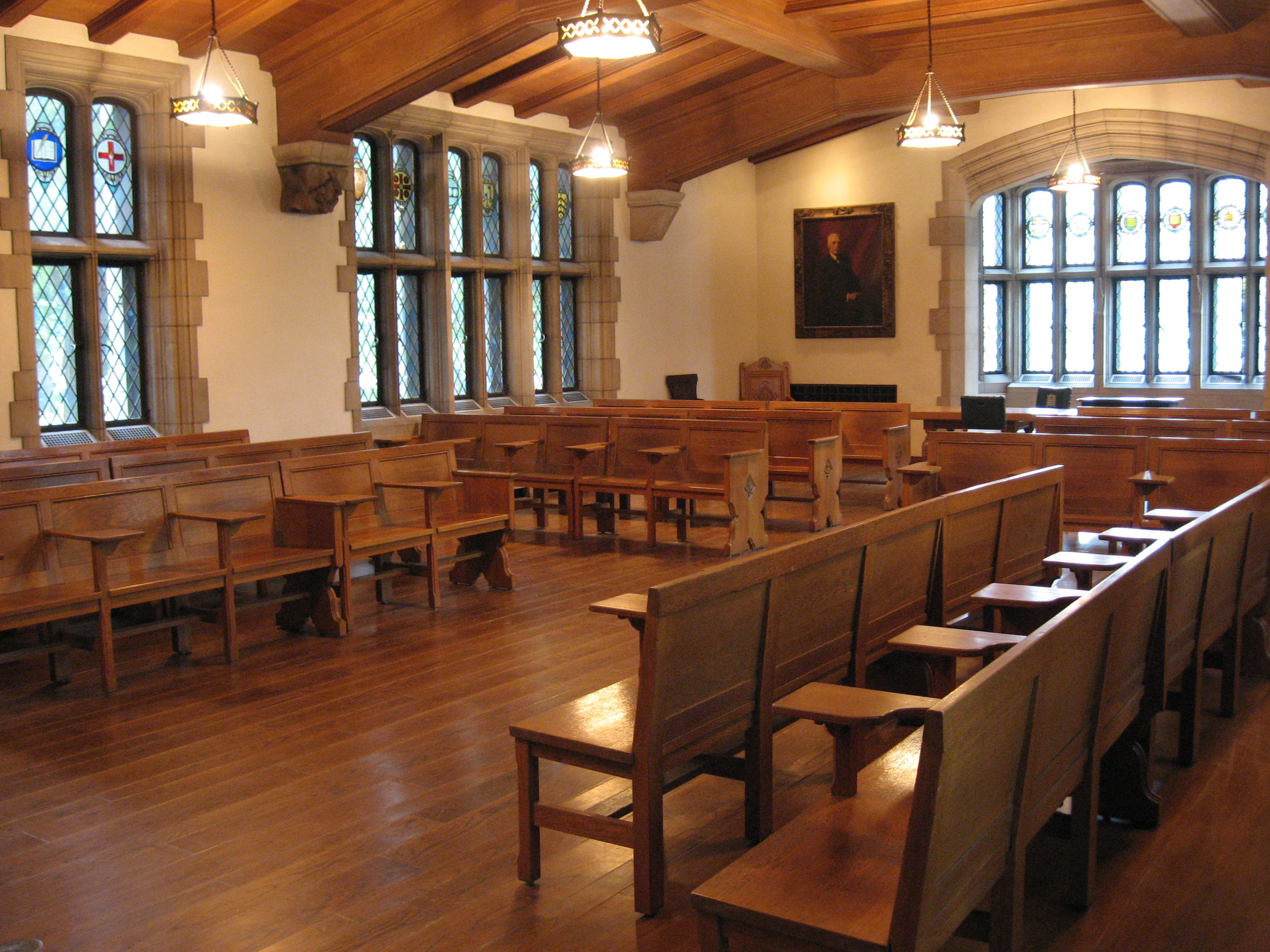
The English Classroom

English Classroom
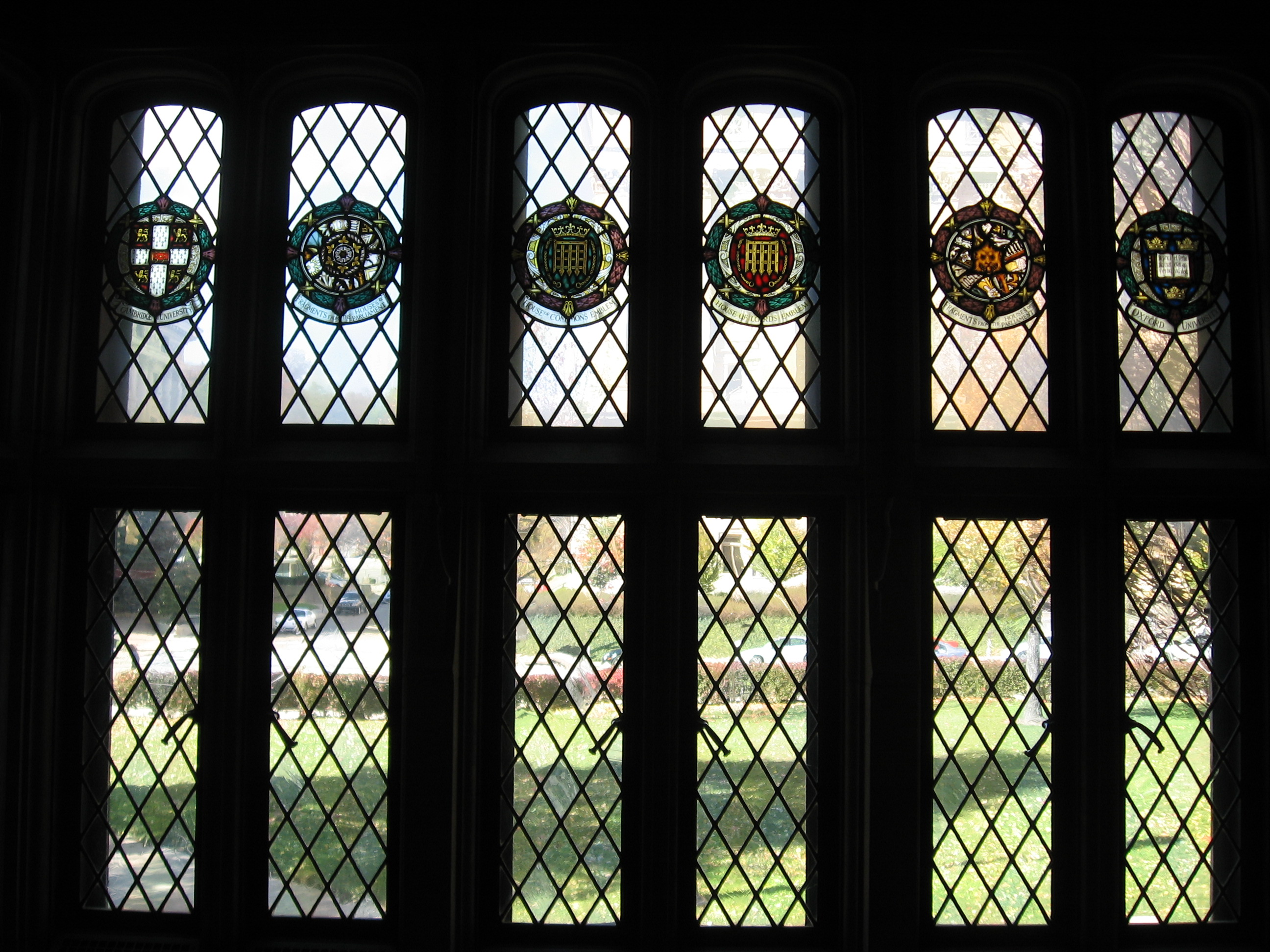
- Location: Room 144
- Dedicated: November 21, 1952
- Style: 16th century Tudor-Gothic
- Architect: Albert A. Klimcheck

The English Classroom is designed in the Tudor-Gothic style after the House of Commons that was rebuilt by Sir Charles Barry following the fire of 1834. The English Classroom is the largest of the Nationality Rooms and incorporates several original items given as gifts from the British Government from the damaged House of Commons, whose Chamber was completely destroyed, following its bombing by the Luftwaffe in 1941, including the stone fireplace, hearth tiles, linenfold oak paneling, entrance doorframe, lintel, and corbels. The fireplace is from the Commons' "Aye Lobby", so named because members walk through it to vote "yes" to a bill, and is marked with the initials V.R. for Victoria Regina. The cast-iron fireback and andirons commemorate the defeat of the Spanish Armada in 1588 and an inscription above the fireplace is from Shakespeare's King Richard II and uses lettering adapted from the letter tiles originally designed for medieval paving by the Monks of Chertsey Abbey in Surrey. The inscription reads: "Set in the silver sea.....this blessed plot, this earth, this realm, this England." Above the doorway hangs a royal coat of arms made in 1688 during the reign of King James II. The linenfold paneling itself arrived at the university still having a blackened coat from the bombing. Under the ceiling trusses are four carved limestone corbels from the House of Commons that are carved with a Tudor rose. Two corbels remain uncarved to emphasize the original carved corbels. The window frames, set in limestone, are characteristic of the Tudor period, and contain old imported glass, seeded and tinted, and encased in small, diamond-shaped leaded frames. Stained-glass window medallions depict the coats of arms of English towns and cities, literary and political figures, scholars of the Universities of Cambridge and Oxford, and the Houses of Lords and Commons. Portraits of University of Pittsburgh alumnus and former ambassador to the Court of St. James's, Andrew Mellon, and the former Earl of Chatham, William Pitt, after whom the city was named, flank the stained glass windows in the rear bay. A brick from 10 Downing Street serves as the room's cornerstone. The white oak floor is fitted together with wooden peg dowels. Tudor-Gothic oak benches resemble the old House of Commons benches and are similarly arranged. Two English oak tables with melon-shaped legs stand before the bay. Two House of Commons Library chairs upholstered in green leather and bearing the official gold crest featuring the portcullis and crown were a gift of Lord Alfred Bossom and were rebuilt using wood from actual chairs in the bombed House of Commons.

=== French ===
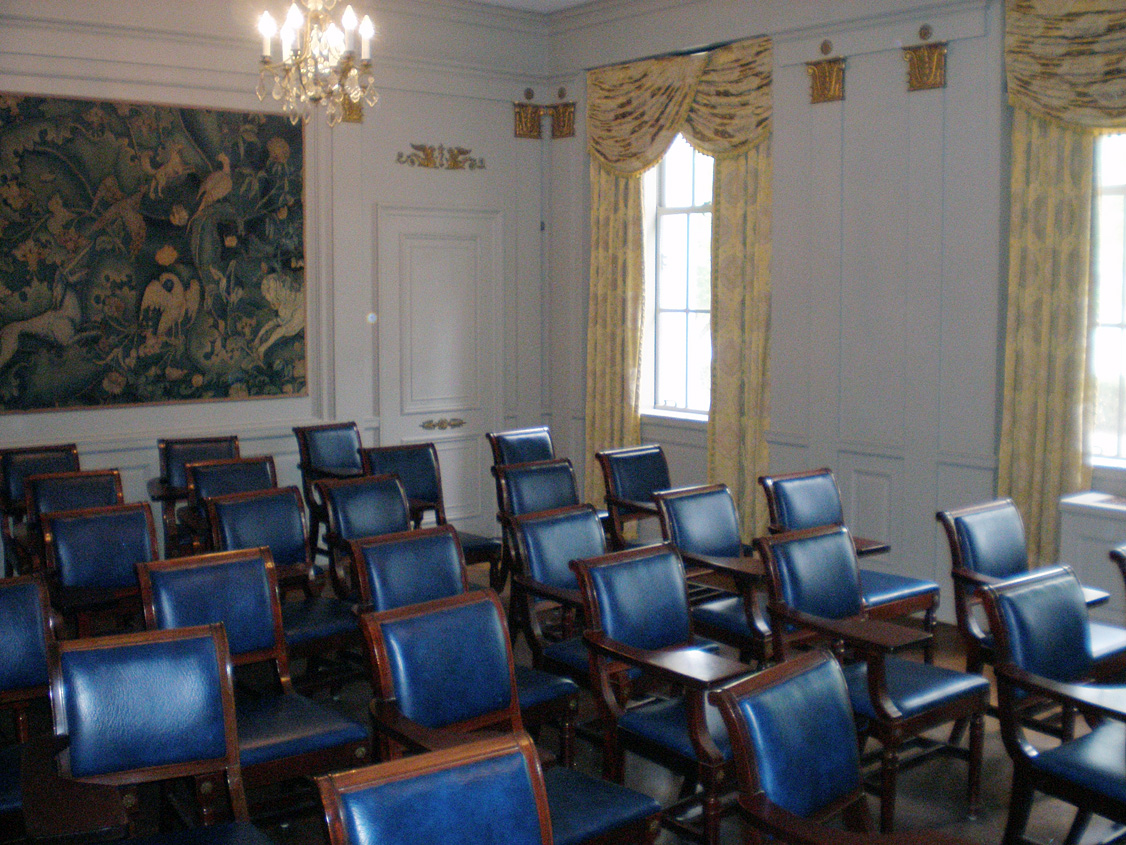
The French Classroom

French Classroom
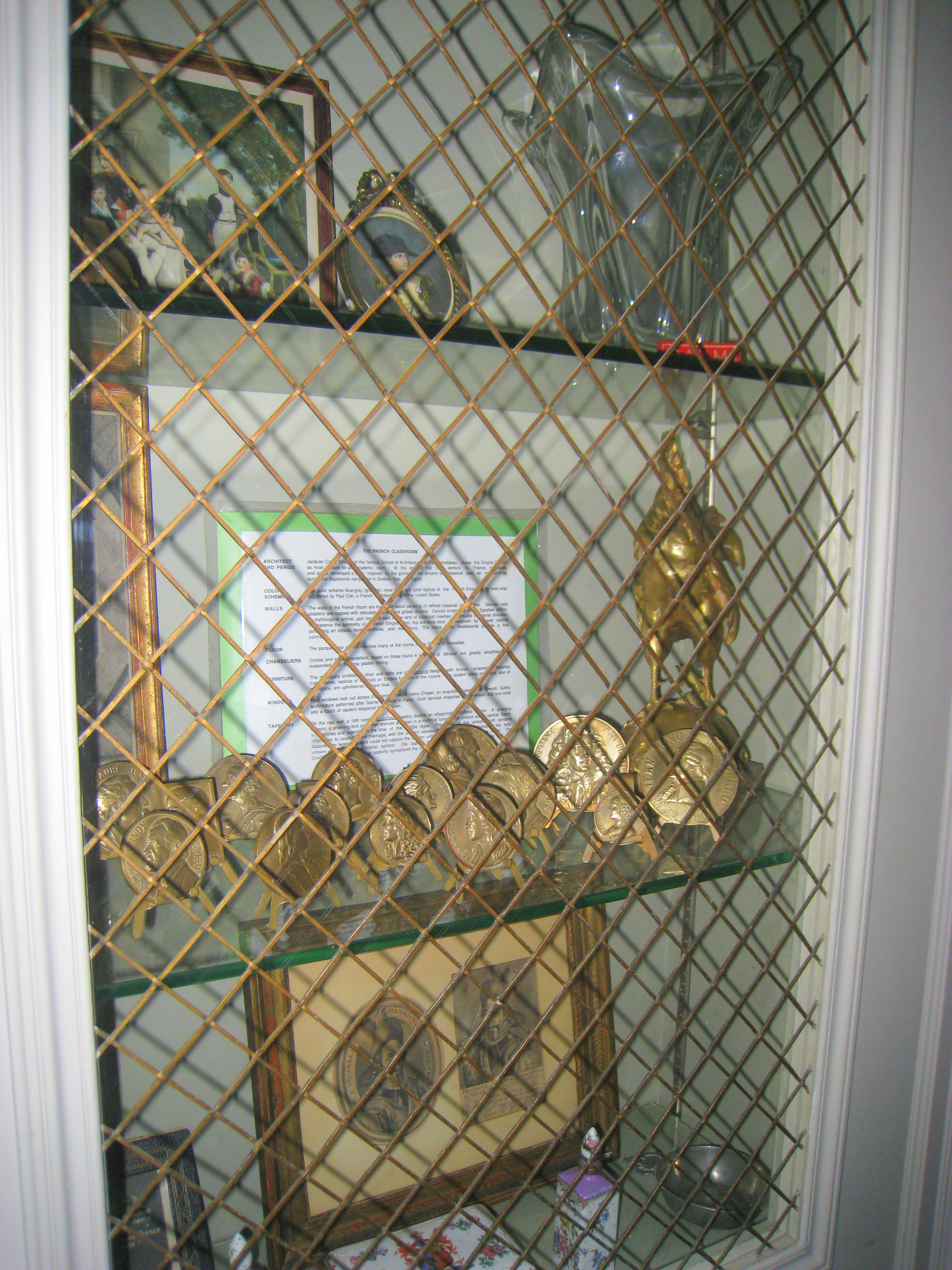
- Location: Room 149
- Dedicated: January 23, 1943
- Style: Late 18th-century French Empire
- Architect: Jacques Carlu, Paris

The French Classroom was designed by Jacques Carlu, Director of the School of Architecture in Fontainebleau, in the French Empire Period that reflects a French style inspired by the glories of the ancient and classical past that were rediscovered during the Napoleonic campaigns in Greece, Italy, and Egypt. This places the timeframe of inspiration for the classroom in the late 18th century and early 19th century, just after the founding of the University of Pittsburgh in 1787, therefore making it the only classroom which represents an era postdating the founding of the university, although many room elements are influenced by the Palace of Versailles which clearly predates it. The color scheme of the room is blue-gray, royal blue, and gold, which were suggested by French-American architect Paul Philippe Cret and are typical colors used at the height of the French Empire. The walls of the room are lined with wood paneling in classical proportions, and slender wall pilasters are capped with delicately carved ad gilded crowns. Carved ornaments of the Egyptian griffin and classical rosettes accentuate panel divisions. A wall cabinet containing art objects, books, and medallions balances the entrance door and maintains the room's symmetry. Crystal and metal chandeliers, which are simplified versions of those found in Palace of Versailles' Hall of Mirrors, hang from a grey plaster ceiling. A parquet floor pattern also reflects many rooms in the Palace of Versailles. A mahogany professor's chair and table are of the Directoire period design include bronze ornaments imported from France that are replicas of originals of Empire furniture in the Louvre. The mahogany student tablet armchairs are upholstered in royal blue. On the rear wall, a 16th-century Choufleur tapestry depicts an allegorical woodland scene including, among other animals, a unicorn which often served as a central figure in tapestries and legends from the Middle Ages. Gold damask draperies with a wreath and lyre motif add to the sense of French opulence and frame the windows which look out on the university's Heinz Memorial Chapel, itself an example of French Gothic architecture inspired by the Sainte-Chapelle in Paris.

=== German ===
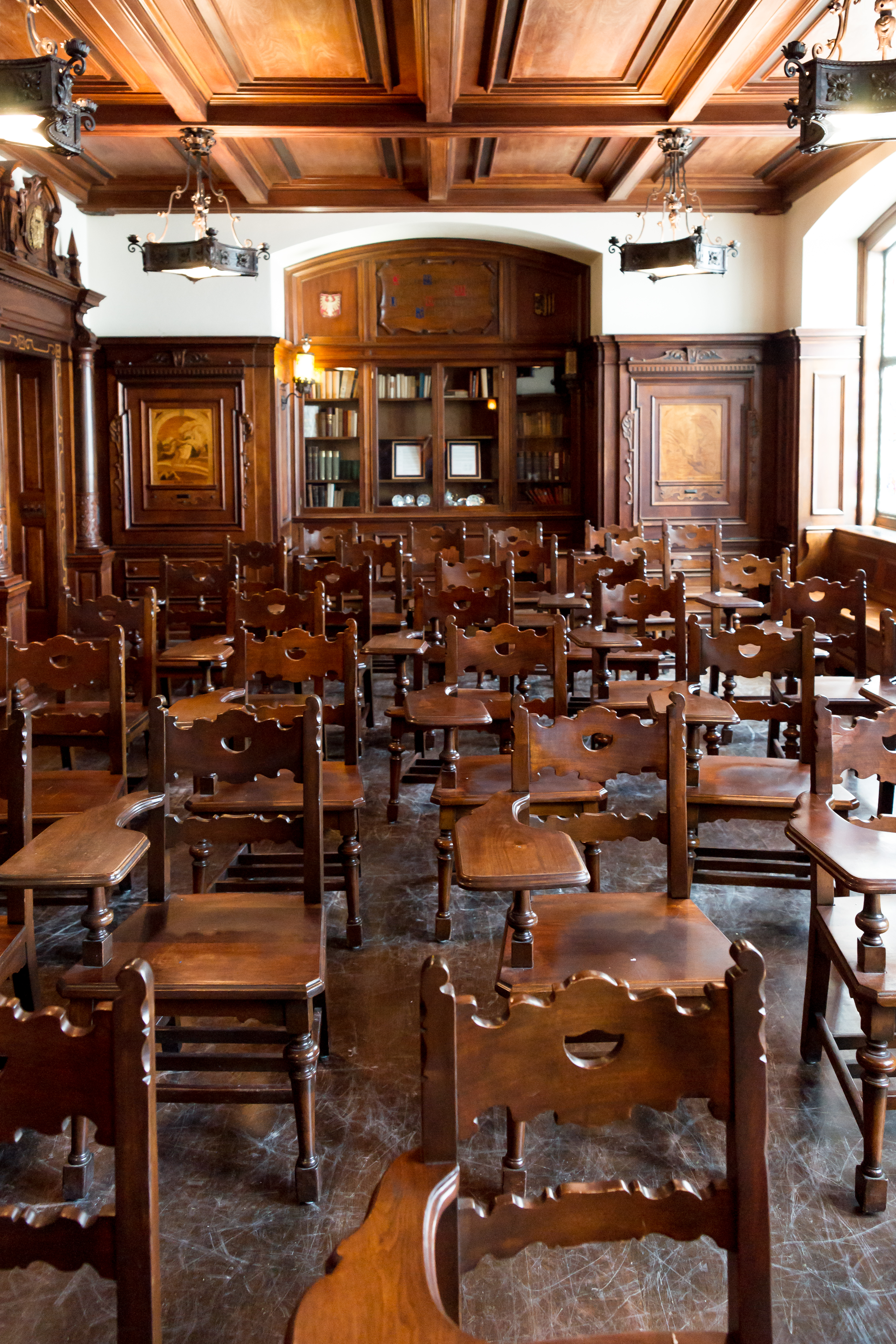
The German Classroom

German Classroom
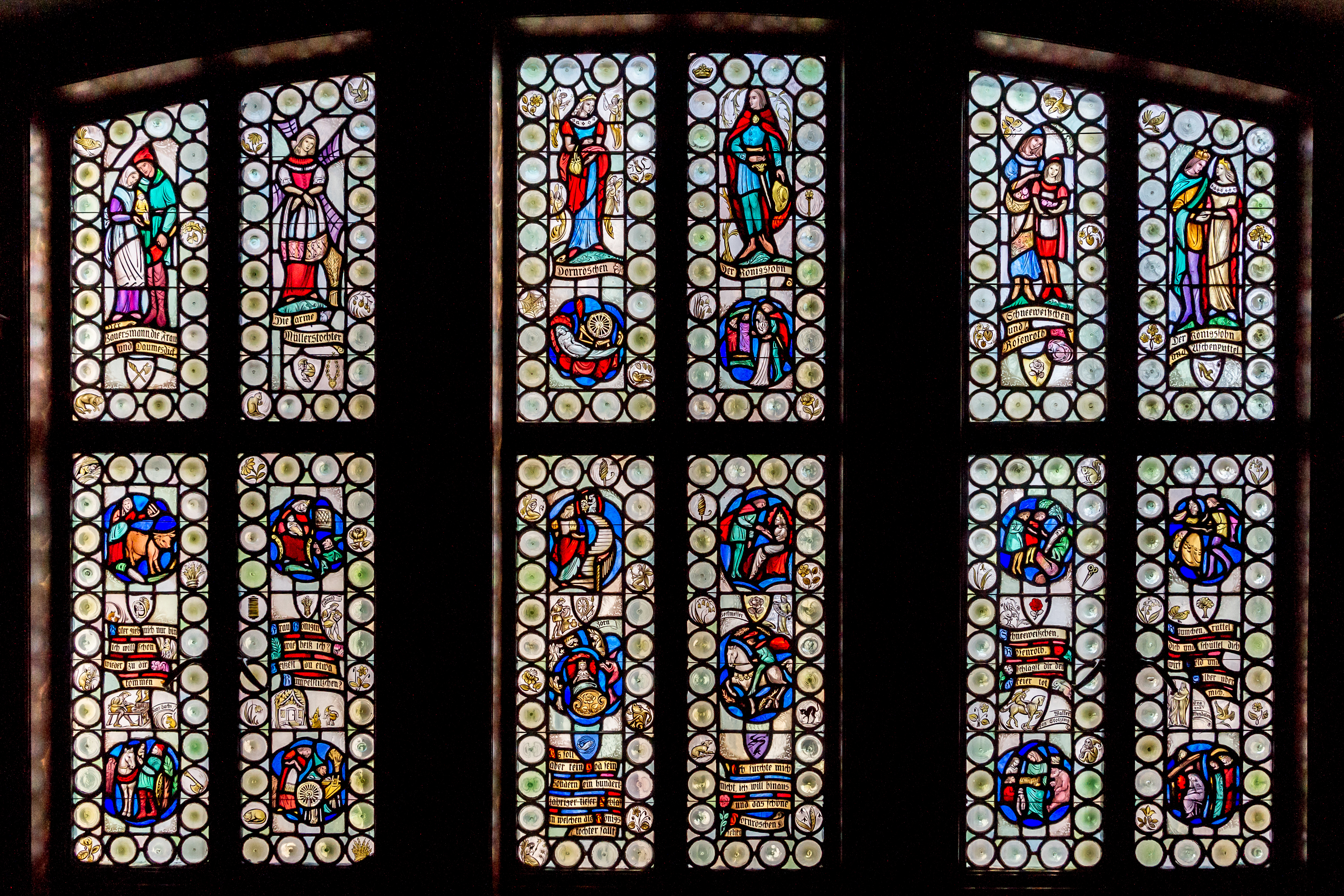
- Location: Room 119
- Dedicated: July 8, 1938
- Style: 16th-century German Renaissance
- Architect: Frank A. Linder, Germany/U.S.

The German Classroom was designed by German-born architect Frank A. Linder to reflect the 16th century German Renaissance as exemplified in the Alte Aula (Great Hall) of the University of Heidelberg. The woodwork of the room was done by German-born Philadelphia decorator Gustav Ketterer and includes walnut paneling framing the blackboards, columns carved with arabesques flanking the two entrance doorways, and support broken-arch pediments surmounted by carved polychromed crests of the two oldest German universities: Heidelberg (1386) and Leipzig (1409). The doors are mounted with ornate wrought-iron hinges and locks, and their upper panels are decorated with intarsia depicting the central square of Nürnberg on the front door and the fountain of Rothenburg on the rear door. Carved in the architrave above the paneling are the names of famous philosophers, poets, musicians, artists, and scientists. The intarsia doors of the four corner cabinets feature tales from German folklore including Parsifal who searched for the Holy Grail, Siegfried who was the hero of the Nibelungenlied, the maiden wooed in Goethe's poem Heidenröslein, and Lorelei who was the golden-haired Rhine maiden whose song lured sailors to destruction. Painted on the escutcheon above the front blackboard are words from Friedrich Schiller's Das Ideal und das Leben, "Stern endeavor, which no arduous task can shake, to the hidden fount of true attains." The rear wall has a quotation from Johann Wolfgang von Goethe's Was wir bringen which reads: "Great mastery results from wise restraint, and law alone points the way to liberty." Furniture includes the professor's leather upholstered chair stands on a small platform behind a burled walnut table and student tablet armchairs are walnut with scroll backs. Wrought-iron chandeliers are the work of German craftsman. The display case contains gifts of artworks and books from Germany's Ministry of Education. The stained-glass windows were designed by master stained glass artist Charles Connick, however they were not completed until 1953 by Connick protege Frances Van Arsdale Skinner. The windows depict characters in the Grimm Brothers' fairy tales such as Little Red Riding Hood, Snow White and the Seven Dwarfs, Hansel and Gretel, and Cinderella.

=== Greek ===
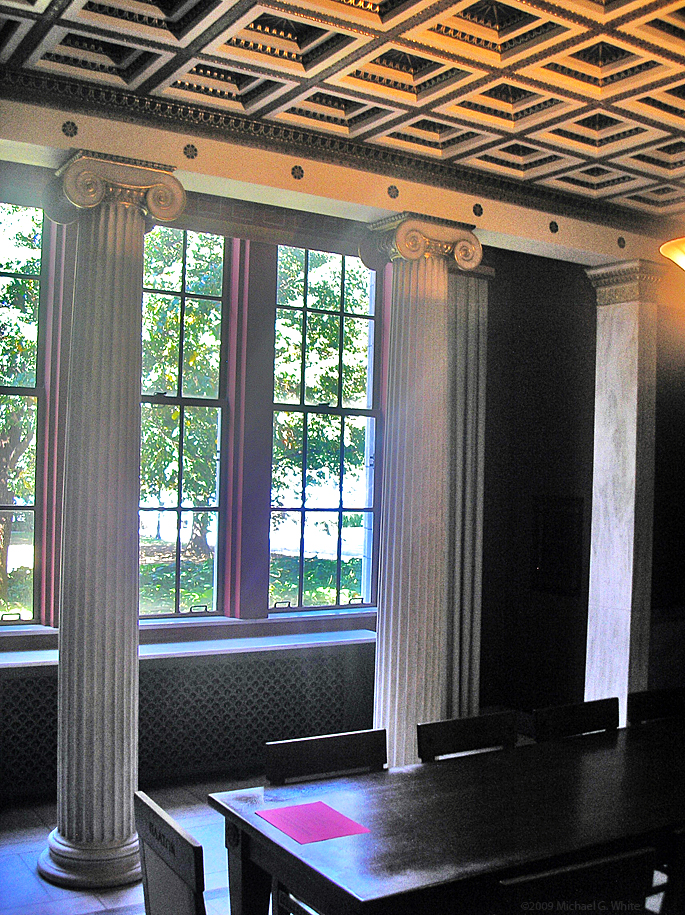
The Greek Classroom

Greek Classroom
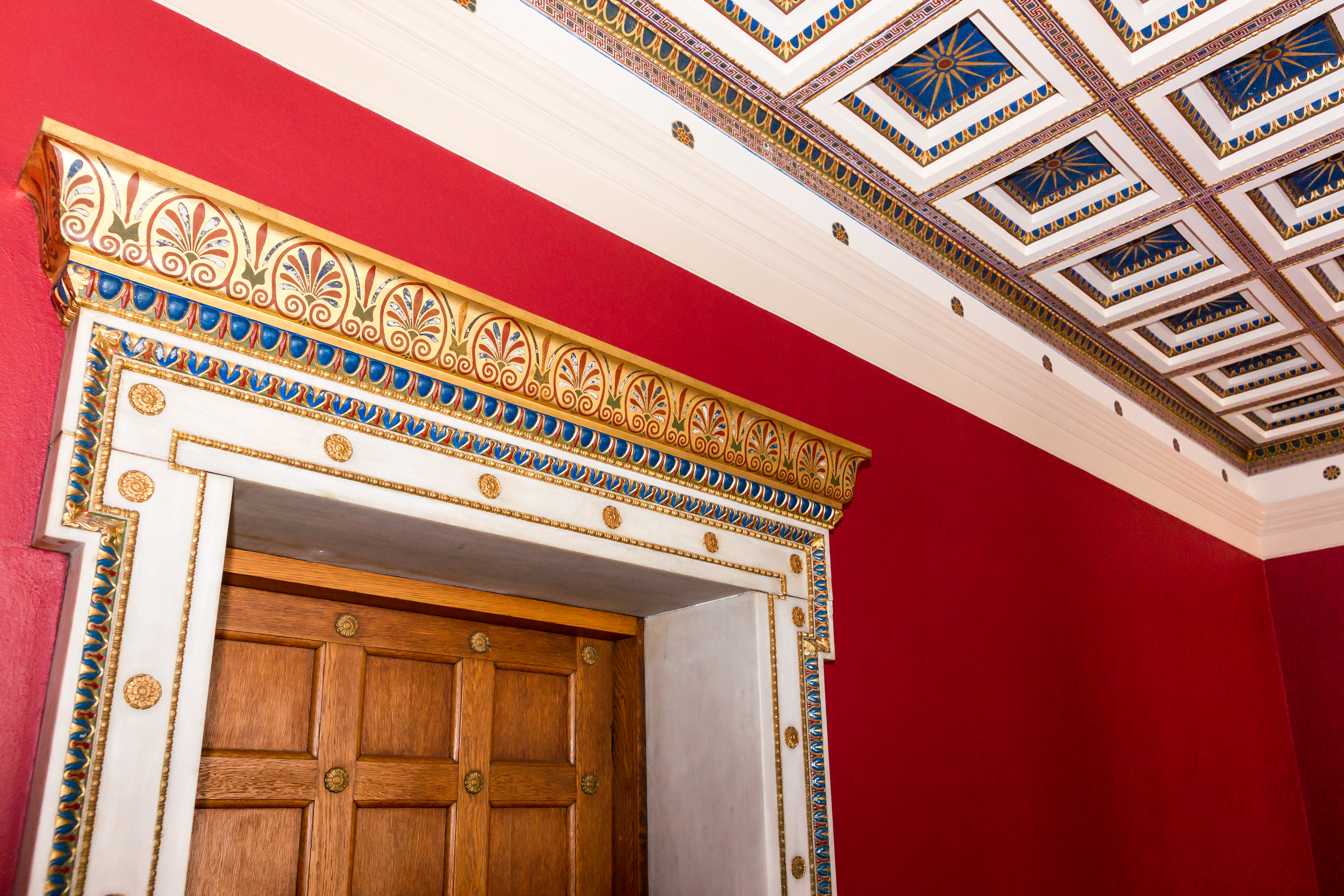
- Location: Room 137
- Dedicated: November 7, 1941
- Style: 5th Century B.C. Classical
- Architect: John Travlos, Athens

The classical architecture of the Greek Classroom represents 5th-century BCE. Athens, the Golden Age of Pericles and includes marble columns and a coffered ceiling. Colored details from the Acropolis' Propylaea and Erectheum appear on white marble. The floor is paved with rectangular slabs of Dionessos Pentelic marble with dark vein. Gray Kokinara marble is used for the dado. The room's columns and pilasters, as well as the coffered ceiling, bear painted decorations identical to those used on ancient Greek structures. The artwork was done by Athenian artist Demetrios Kokotsis who used the traditional encaustic painting method, employing earth colors and beeswax applied freehand which was then overlaid with 24-carat gold leaf rubbed on by polishing bones which required two men more than seven months to complete. White oak furniture, patterned after designs on Greek vases, is decorated with gold-leaf carvings and sunburst inlays of ebony. Student chair backs carry the names of Greek islands and towns. The professor's and guests' chairs bear the names of Plato, Aristotle, and Socrates. A line from Homer's Iliad exhorts students to strive for nobility and excellence. The deep red wall color is repeated in the drapery valance with its Greek key design. Archives in the alcove cabinet record visits by the Queen of Greece, and by ecclesiastic and diplomatic officials. In 1940, one of two marble pilasters for the room that was being constructed in Greece from the Mt Pentele stone quarry used to build the Parthenon, cracked shortly before shipping to the United States. With an invading World War II army massing on its borders, the column could not be replaced. Greek architect John Travlos ordered a matching crack etched into the undamaged column in order to preserve the symmetry. The marble was transported on the last ship to sail to America prior to the invasion and occupation of Greece. In November 1941, Travlos crouched under a blanket in his apartment closet listening to banned BBC radio broadcasts. Suddenly, Greek ecclesiastical music spouted from the radio, and Travlos heard the people of Pittsburgh dedicate his memorial to Greece.

=== Hungarian ===
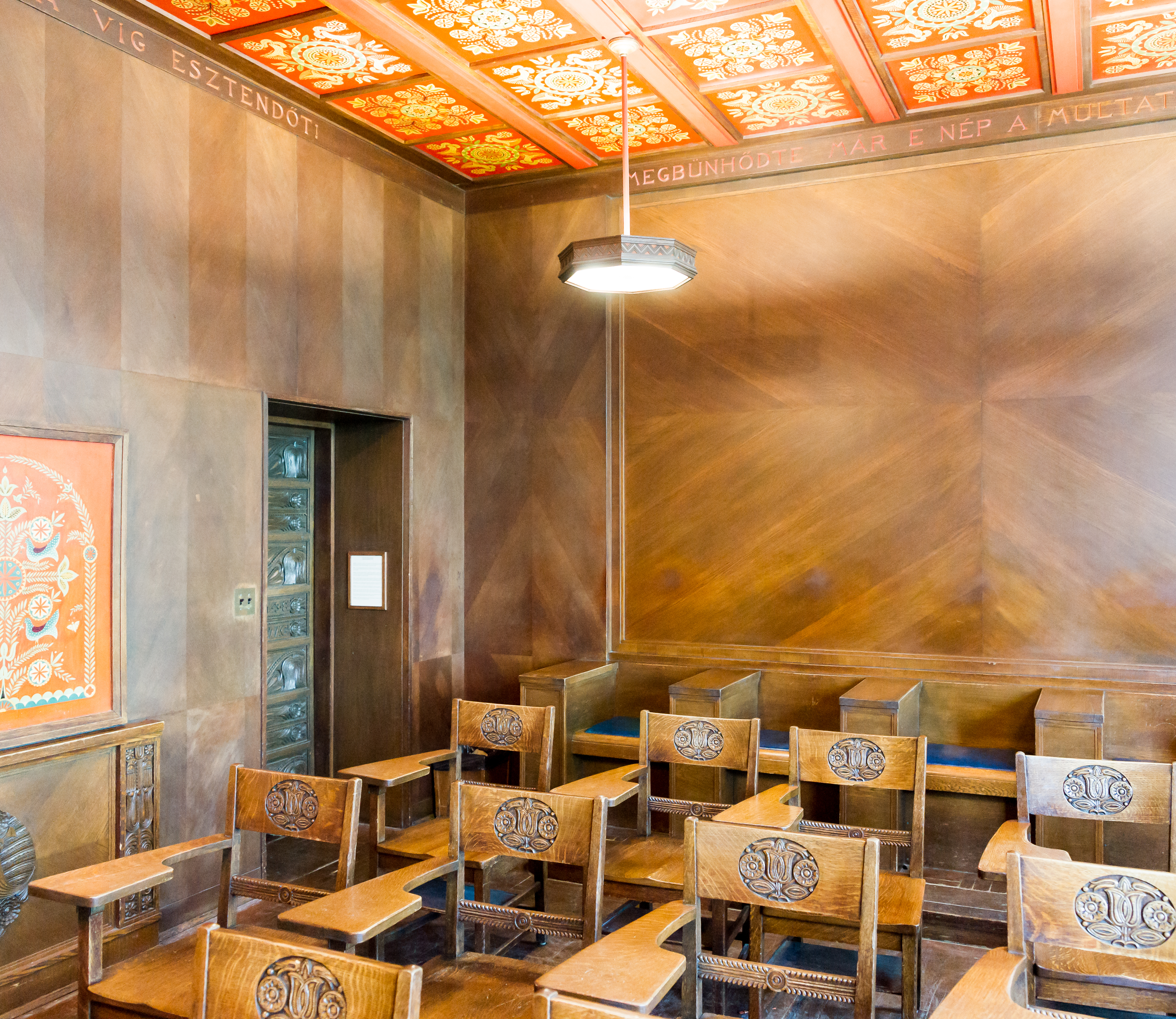
The Hungarian Classroom

Hungarian Classroom
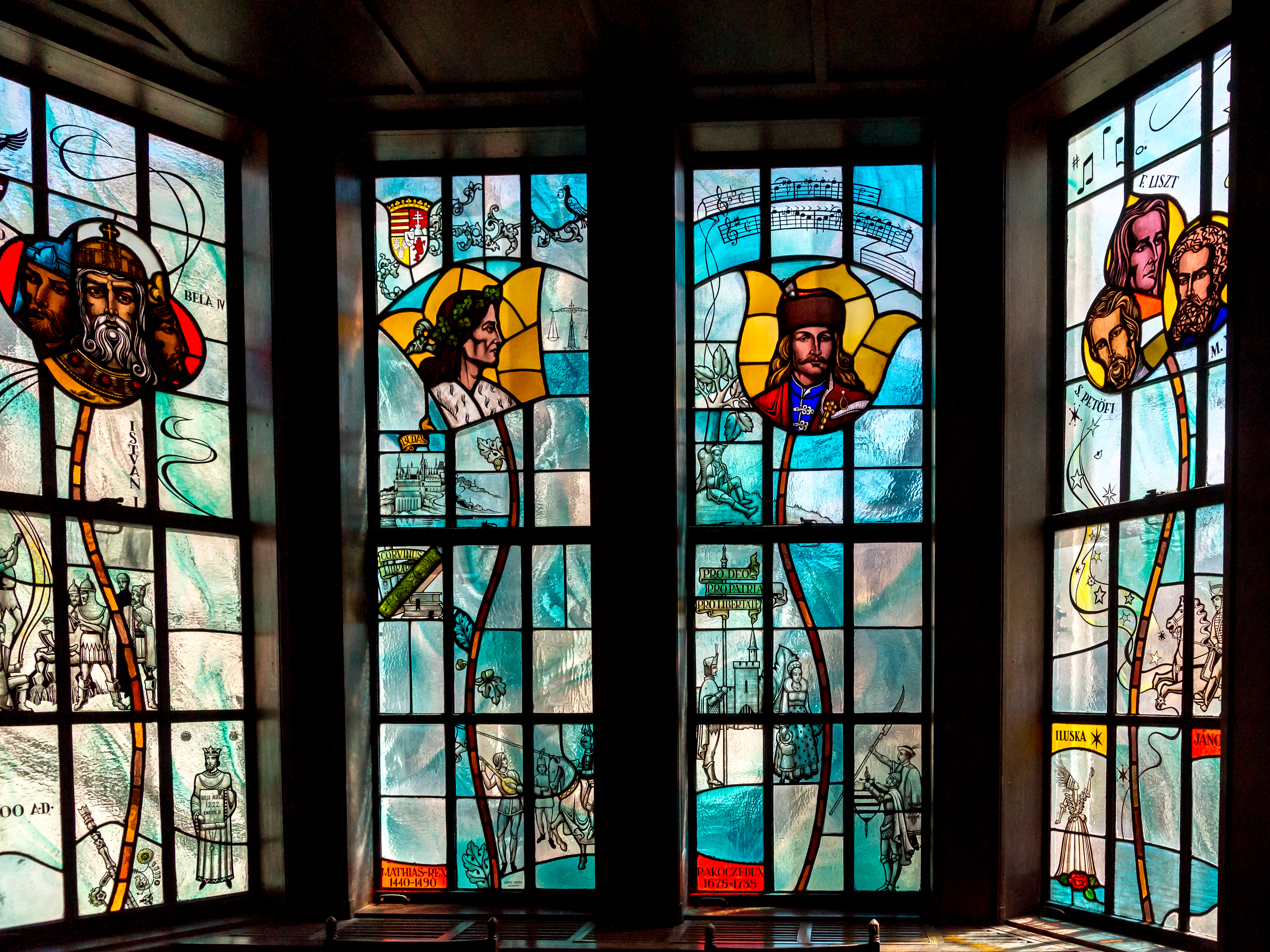
- Location: Room 121
- Dedicated: September 29, 1939
- Style: Folk Motif
- Architect: Dénes Györgyi, Budapest

Dénes Györgyi, a professor at the Industrial Art School in Budapest, won the Hungarian Classroom design competition sponsored by Hungary's Ministry of Education in 1930 which features Magyar folk art combined with deep wood carvings and historic stained glass windows. The walls of the room are oak veneer stained a soft tobacco brown. The wood in the panels was carefully selected and matched, so that the natural grains form interesting decorative patterns. The ceiling is 70 wooden cazettas suspended in a wooden frame and has a predominant hue of "paprika red", a color inspired by the peppers which are hung to dry over white fences in Hungary. The cazettas are decorated with folk motifs (birds, hearts, and tulips) in turquoise, green, and white were painted by Antal Diossy in Budapest. Joining the ceiling and walls is an inscription frieze with the first two stanzas of Himnusz, the Hungarian National Anthem by Ferenc Kölcsey. Above the blackboard is the coat of arms of the University of Buda which was founded in 1388. At the top is the crown of St. Stephen, the patron saint of Hungary and its first Christian king. The student seats are made of oak and are unadorned except for stylized carved tulip ornaments on the back. A bench along the rear wall and guest chairs are upholstered in blue. Along the corridor wall, panels carved with floral, plant, and bird designs invoke a "tulip chest" which are the traditional hope chests of Hungarian village brides that are decorated with tulips. In the display case lined with soft blue velvet is an exhibit of Hungarian porcelain, lace, embroidery, and costumed dolls. Stained and painted glass windows depict the legend of Hungary's founding as well as important events in the nation's history and culture. The rear window depicts King Nimrod and his sons, Hunor and Magor, who pursued a white stag from the east to the fertile Danube plain. Descendants of Hunor became the Huns and those of Magor became the Magyars. The bay windows commemorate historic figures and events of the Middle Ages, Renaissance, and 17th and 19th centuries. The oak entrance doors bears deep carvings of tulips, pomegranate leaves, daisies, and wheat. The door's center panel states the date of the room's completion in 1938. The carvings were made by American wood carvers of Hungarian birth from plaster models that were made in Budapest to ensure Magyar authenticity.

=== Indian ===
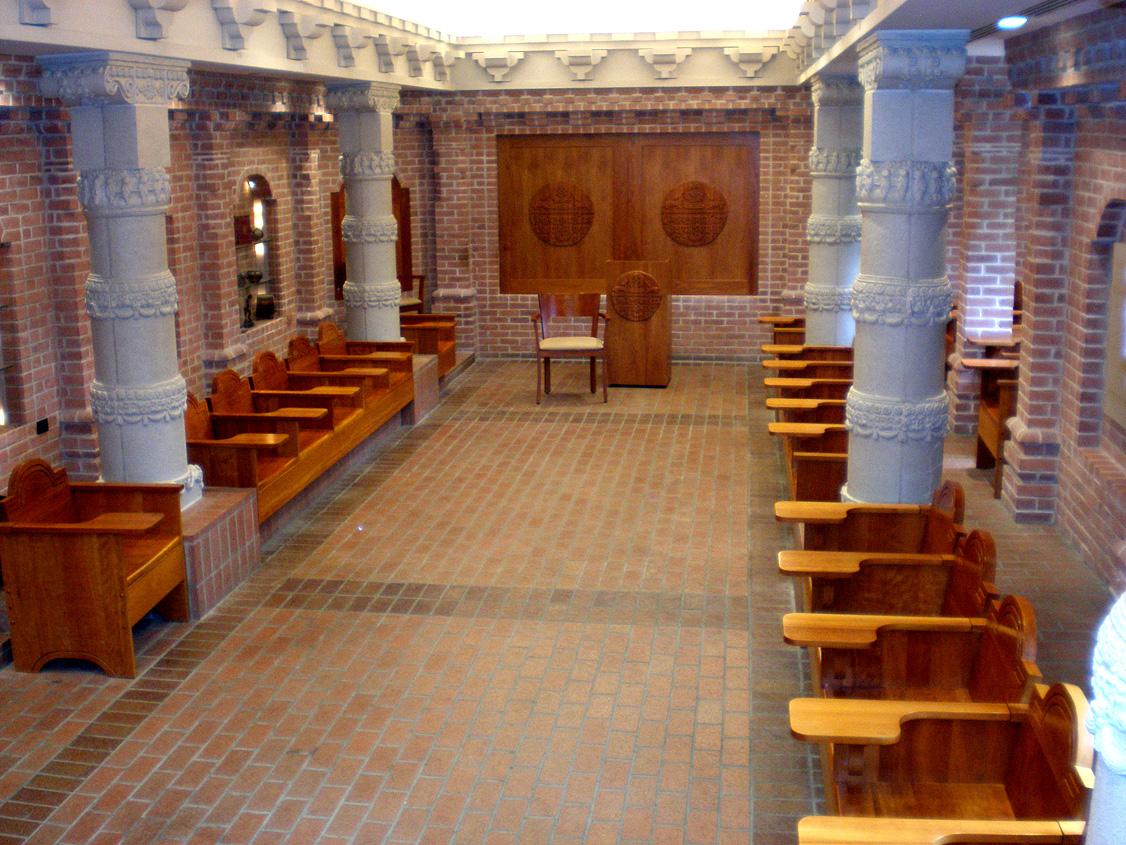
The Indian Classroom

Indian Classroom
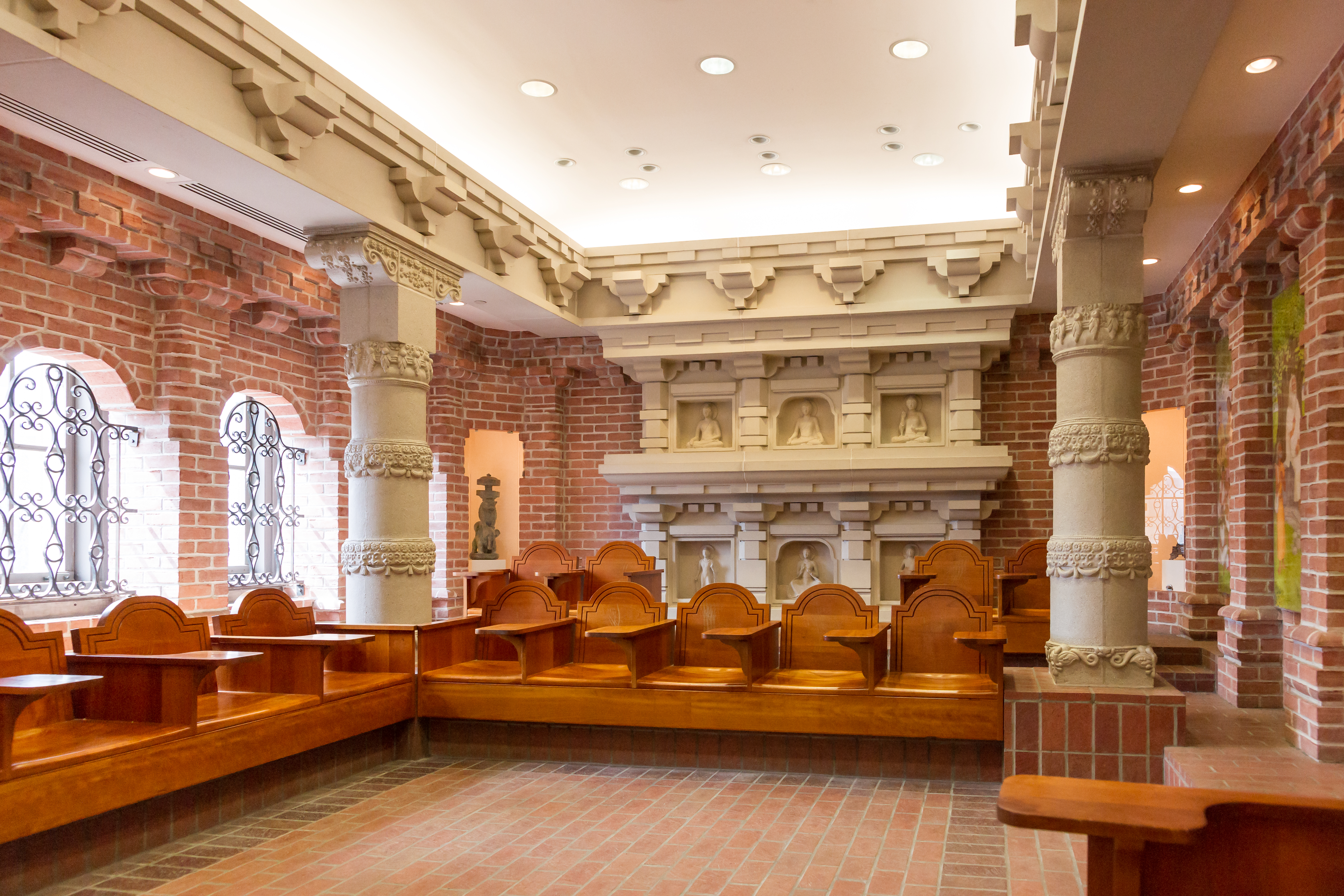
- Location: Room 327
- Dedicated: January 9, 2000
- Style: 4th–9th-century Indian Renaissance
- Architect: Deepak Wadhwani, A.I.A.

The Indian Classroom is modeled on a typical 4th–9th century AD courtyard from Nalanda Mahavihara, an Indian Buddhist monastic complex which is often characterized as an early university. At its peak, Nalanda's five temples and 11 monasteries covered 32 acres (130,000 m^{2}) and attracted thousands of students from across Asia. The room depicts a classroom courtyard at Nalanda. The pale rose bricks, specially fabricated to reflect the hue and texture of the original, form the walls, floor, pilasters, and niches. Six stone columns decorated with rosettes, swags, and fruit echo those found at Nalanda. The rear sculpture wall, a scaled down version of one at Nalanda's Stupa #3, bears images of six Bodhisattvas. Flanking display cases hold replicas of ancient bronze sculptures found at the site. A watercolor triptych depicts male and female students at Nalanda as scholar-monk Silabhadra says farewell to 7th-century Chinese traveler Xuanzang. Gurus taught classes in the courtyards, which were surrounded by residential cells. The cherry wood chalkboard doors and flanking cabinets bear carved seals of Nalanda University with recumbent deer above a Sanskrit inscription. Cast steel grilles in front of the windows, hand wrought into forms which reflect decorative elements of the columns, filter the light and soften the view of the 20th-century outside world. Renaissance 3 Architects received the Master Builders Association Craftsmanship Award for its construction.

=== Irish ===
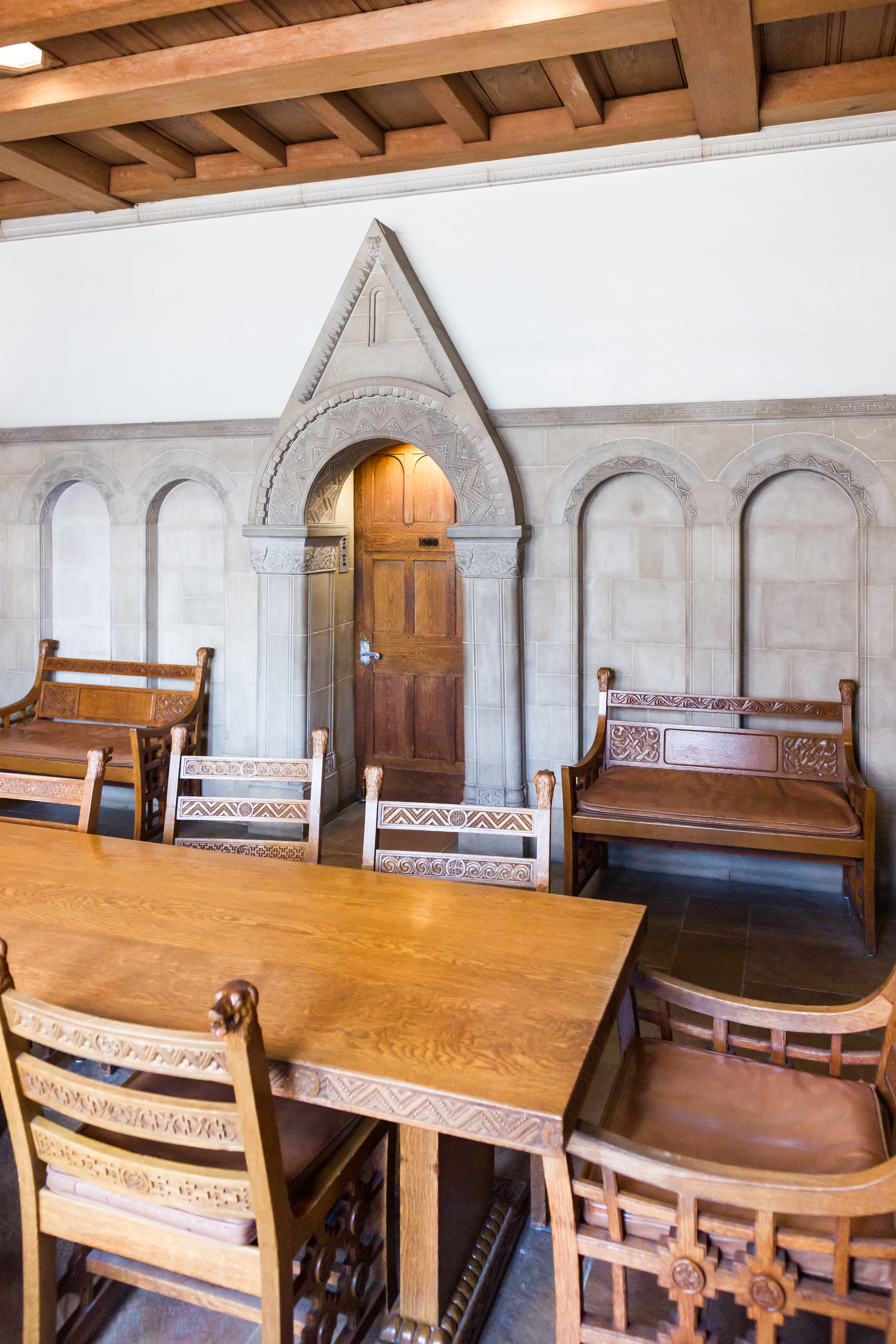
The Irish Classroom

Irish Classroom
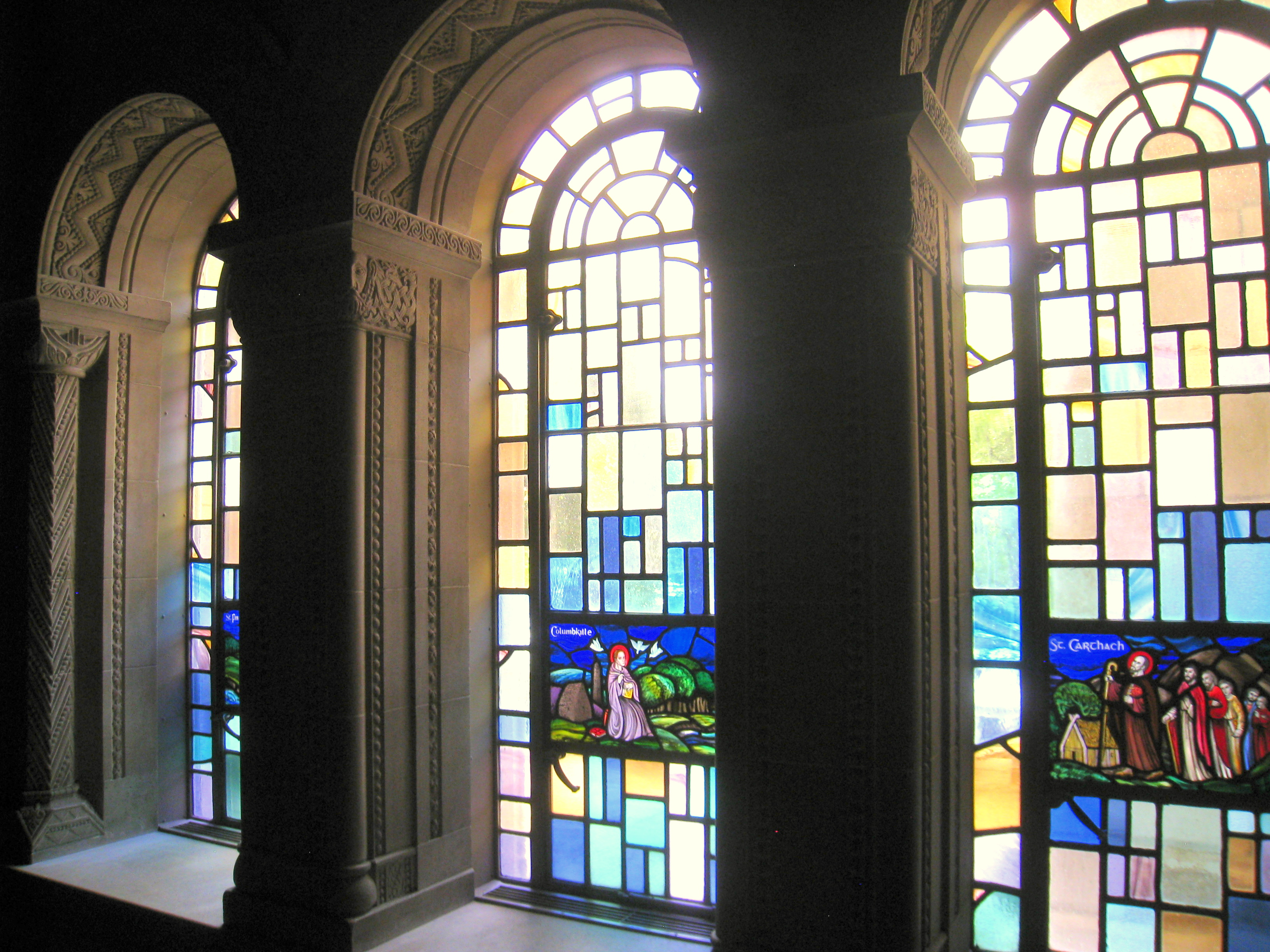
- Location: Room 127
- Dedicated: May 18, 1957
- Style: 500–1200 A.D. Irish Romanesque
- Architect: Harold G. Leask, Dublin

The Irish Classroom is the smallest of the Nationality Rooms. The limestone room is designed in Irish Romanesque style, which flourished from the 6th to the 12th centuries and is similar in type, size, and materials to oratories first built on the west coast of Ireland. Adapted from Killeshin Chapel in County Carlow, the triangular doorway gable is carved with human and animal masks against a background of zig-zag and beaded designs. The blackboard frame's pendental arches are carved with foliage, images of wolfhounds, and stylized cat masks. On the opposite wall a sculptured stone chest, under a monumental recessed arch, is patterned after a bishop's tomb in Cormac's chapel. Its ornate sculpture depicts the "Great Beast", a greyhound-like animal wreathed in interlaced ornaments. On the chest rests a replica of the Gospels from the Book of Kells. The wrought-iron case bears bird and beast designs drawn from the Book of Kells. Stained-glass windows, created in 1956/7 by the Harry Clarke Studios in Dublin, portray famous teachers at three of Ireland's oldest centers of learning; St. Finnian at Clonard, St. Columkille at Derry, and St. Carthach at Lismore. Illuminations in the Book of Kells inspired the chair design, except for the wolfhound heads. The oak-beamed ceiling is characteristic of Irish oratories. The cornerstone, from the Abbey of Clonmacnoise, is carved with the Irish Gaelic motto, "For the Glory of God and the Honour of Ireland." The cornerstone conceals a container of earth from Northern Ireland (County Armagh) and the Republic of Ireland (County Meath). The room was designed by Harold G. Leask, the former Inspector of National Monuments with The Office of Public Works (The O.P.W.) in Ireland.

Gov. David L. Lawrence, Art Rooney Sr., founding owner of the Pittsburgh Steelers, and James W. Knox, a member of the Pittsburgh Irish community, were on the room's organizing committee. After the assassination of President John F. Kennedy, Jacqueline Kennedy ordered a Marine guard to deliver the Oval Office Presidential and American flags to Evelyn Lincoln, private secretary to the president. In her will, Lincoln bequeathed the flags to the University of Pittsburgh for the Irish Room in honor of Knox. The John F. Kennedy scholarship for study in Ireland and a James W. Knox endowment for graduate study abroad were created from the proceeds generated from their auction.

=== Israel Heritage ===
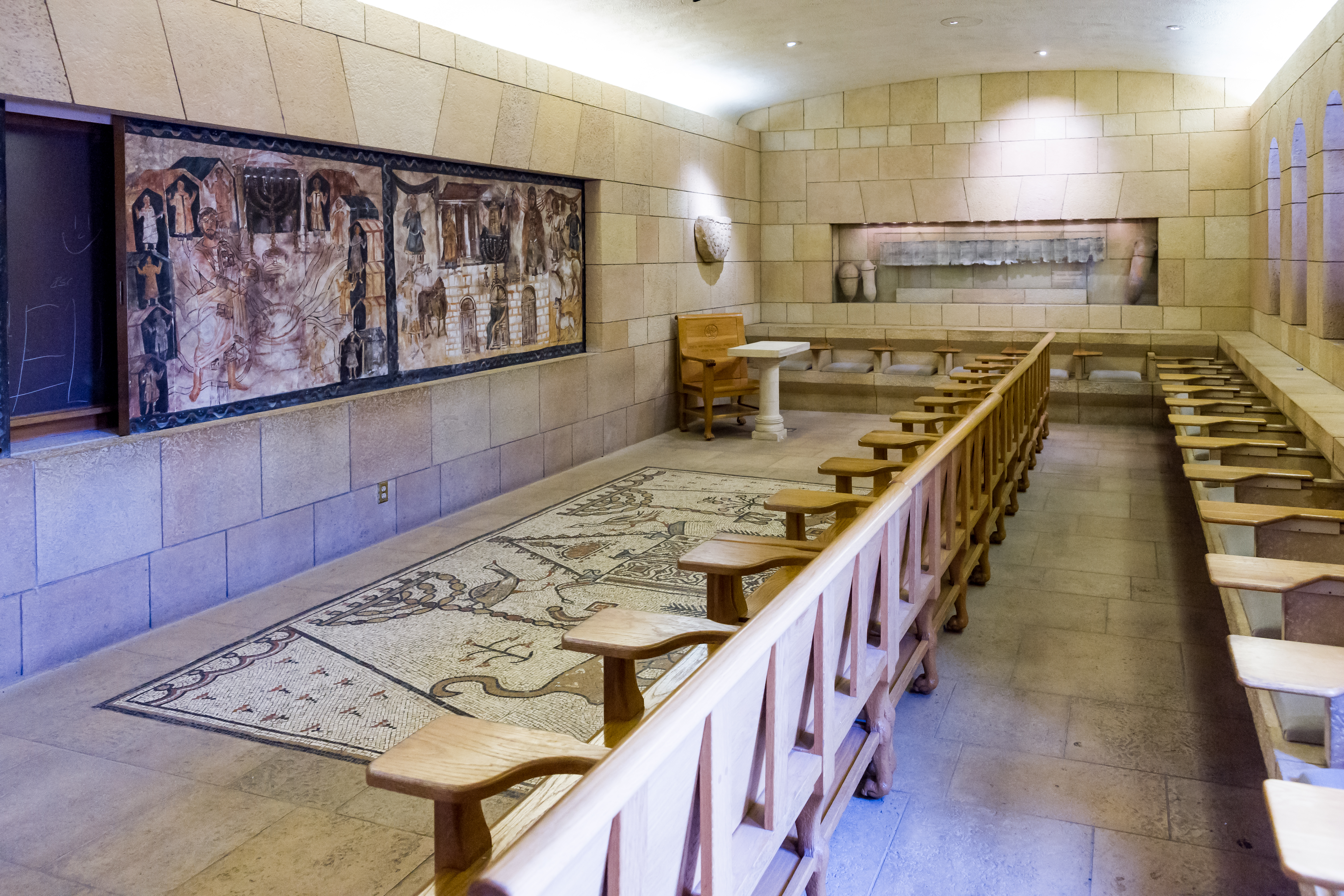
The Israel Heritage Classroom

Israel Heritage Classroom
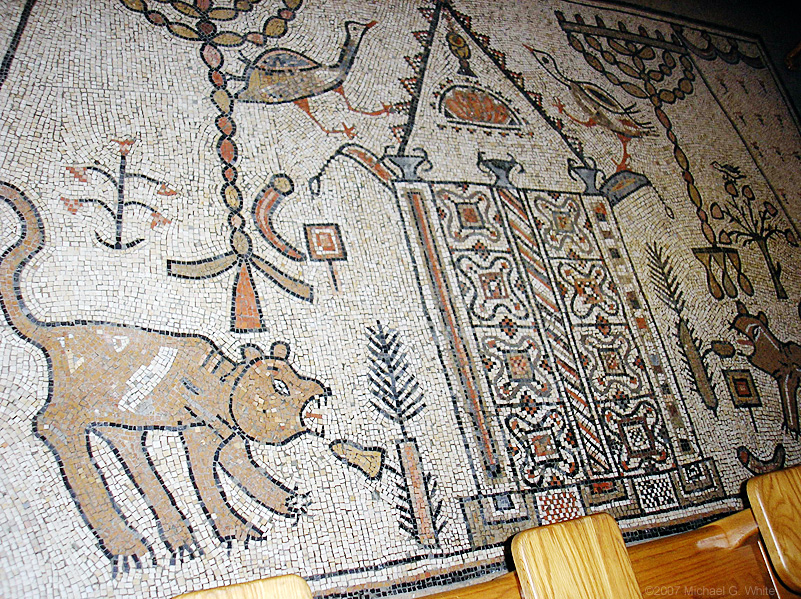
- Location: Room 337
- Dedicated: November 1, 1987
- Concept: Alexander Kaufman
- Style: 1st century Israel Stone Structure
- Architect: Martin Chetlin, A.I.A.

The Israel Heritage Classroom reflects the simplicity of a 1st-century Galilean stone dwelling or house of assembly, this room's benches are patterned after those in the 2nd–3rd-century synagogue of Capernaum. The Ten Commandments, carved in Hebrew, grace the oak entrance door. Grapes, pomegranates, and dates on the stone frieze, copied from Capernaum, represent crops grown in the Galilee. On the window wall, an inscription discovered in the 6th-century Rehob synagogue cites the Talmudic laws governing the growing of crops each seventh year. A scroll fragment in the rear case replicates the Dead Sea Isaiah Scroll segment which contains the prophecy "They shall beat their swords into plowshares and their spears into pruning hooks..." Ancient wine jars flank the scroll. The professor's table, based on one found in Jerusalem's 1st-century burnt house, stands before a copy of the only existing stone Menorah which served as a functional candelabrum. The quotation on the chair reads: "I learned much from my teachers, more from my colleagues, and most of all from my pupils." Three segments from the 6th-century Dura Europos murals grace the chalkboard doors, Ezra the Scribe, reads the law; Moses brings forth water for the 12 tribes; and the sons of Aaron consecrate the Temple. Oak benches bear the names of the twelve tribes of Israel. The floor mosaic replicates one in the 6th century Galilean synagogue of Beth Alpha.

=== Italian ===
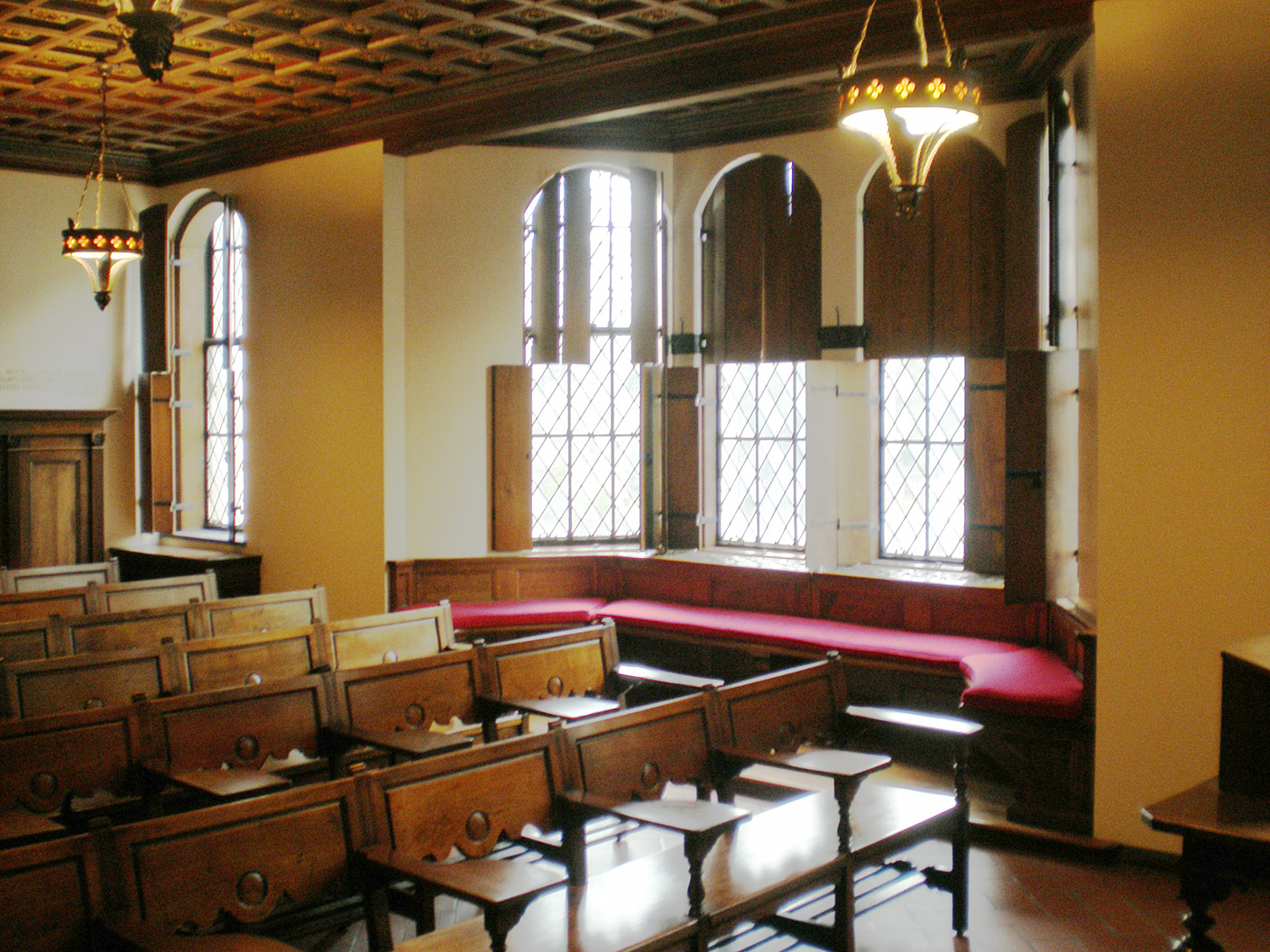
The Italian Classroom

Italian Classroom
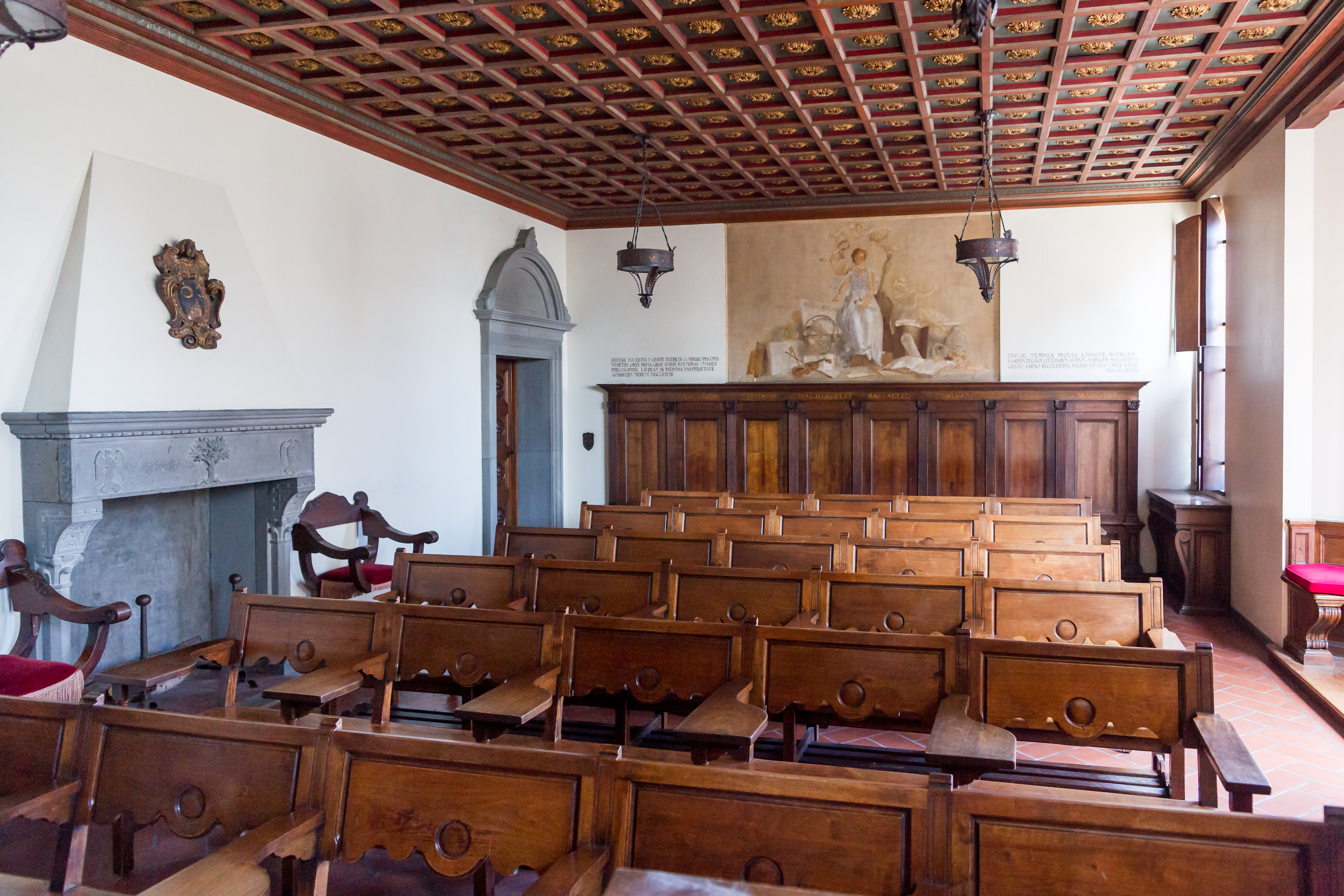
- Location: Room 116
- Dedicated: May 14, 1949
- Style: 15th-century Italian Renaissance
- Architect: Ezio Cerpi, Florence

The Italian Classroom reflects the serenity of a 15th-century Tuscan monastery, with its traditional devotion to religion, art, music, and education. The rear choir stall bench and shuttered windows introduce the monastic theme. The blackboard doors recall an armadio, a cabinet behind an altar used to hold priestly vestments. The turquoise soffitto a cassettoni (coffered ceiling), embellished with carved, gold-leafed rosettes, was inspired by one originally in the San Domenico Convent at Pesaro. In the architrave, names of famous Italians are inlaid in olive wood. The lettering resembles that used in the inscription on the Arch of Titus in Rome. Bay benches are cushioned in red velvet. The red tile floor is set in a herring-bone pattern similar to that of Florence's Palazzo Vecchio. An original Florentine fireplace, made of sandstone from the quarries of Fiesole, bears the carved Latin inscription, "O Lord, do not forsake me." On either side stand Savonarola chairs. Monastery bench designs, adapted for student use, are carved with names and founding dates of Italian universities. The oldest is the University of Bologna, established in 1088. From the front of the room, a bronze bust of Dante Alighieri faces Giovanni Romagnoli's mural of Elena Lucrezia Cornaro Piscopia, the first woman in the world to achieve a university degree when she was awarded a Doctor of Philosophy degree in 1678 by the University of Padua.

=== Japanese ===
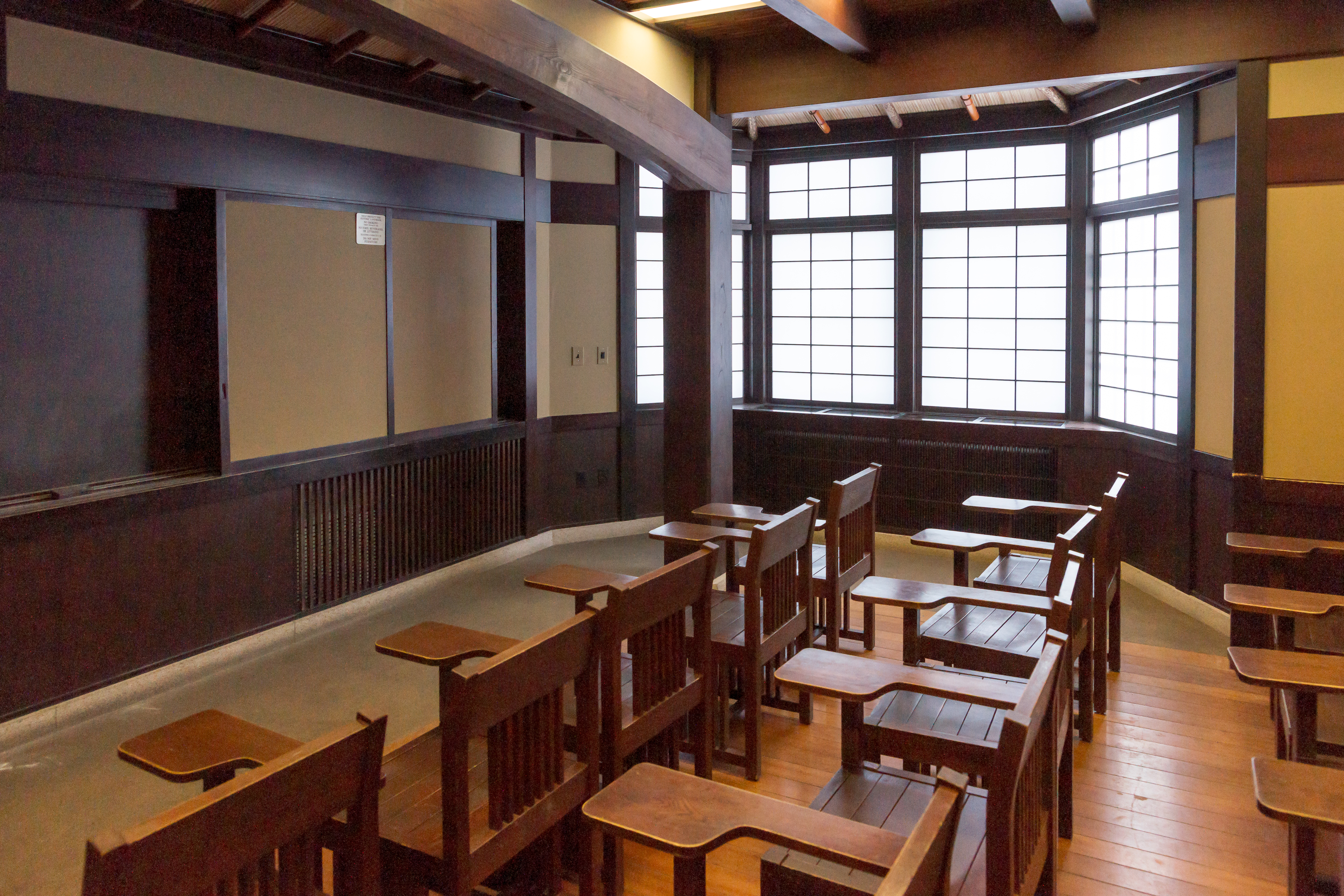
The Japanese Classroom

Japanese Classroom
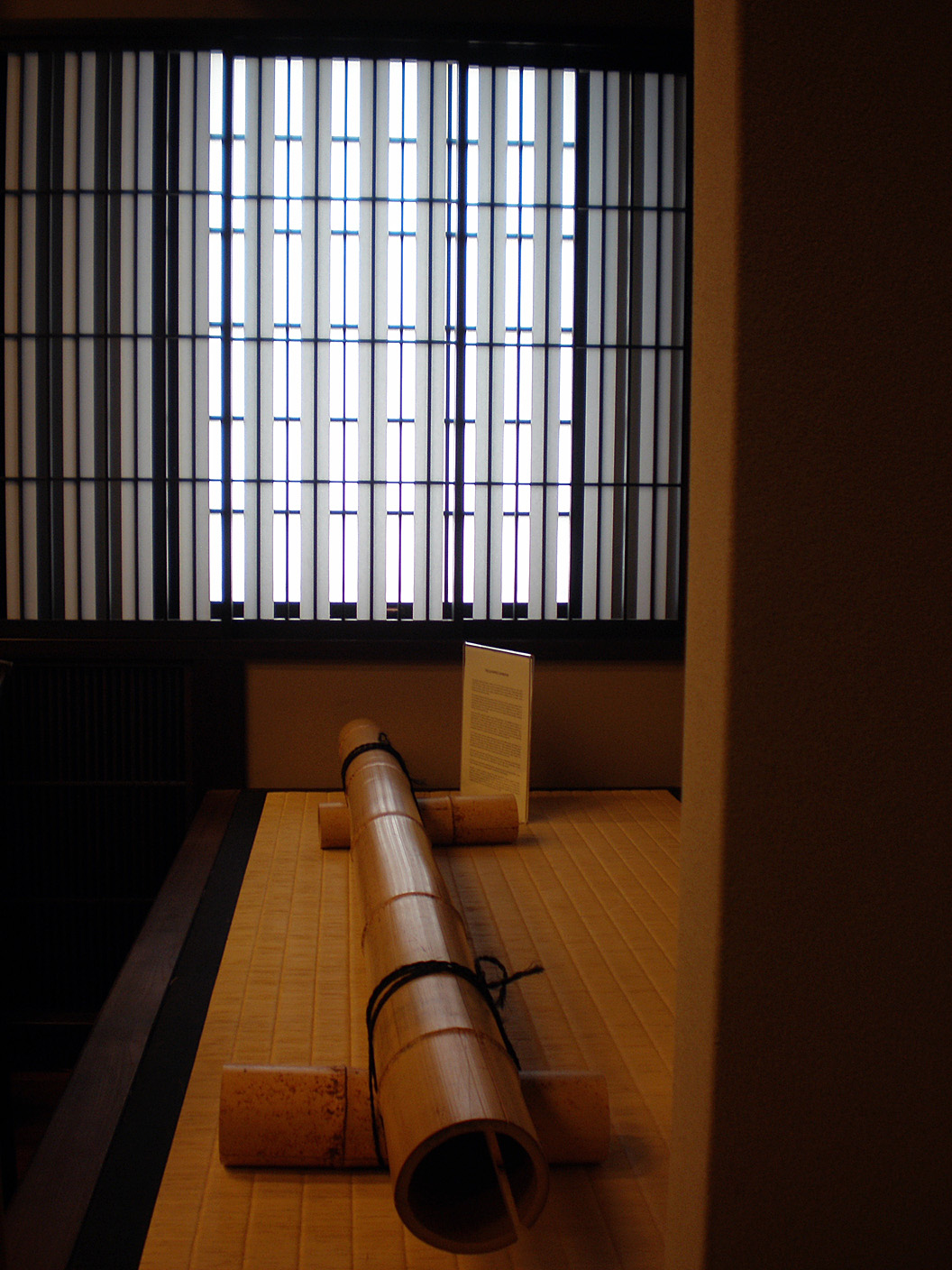
- Location: Room 317
- Dedicated: July 25, 1999
- Style: Minka
- Designer: Hirokazu Nagase, Kyoto
- Architect: Norman Harai, A.I.A.

The Japanese Nationality Room celebrates traditional Japanese carpentry and woodcraft, evoking the mid-18th century minka which were houses of the non-ruling classes of Japan. This room is representative of minka that might be the residence of an important village leader in a farm village on the outskirts of Kyoto and the design represents the core rooms of the house: a plank-floored ima or household sitting room and the adjacent doma, an area with a compacted earthen floor used as an entry-way, for cooking and as a work space. The doma was also a space for household life, where farm, business and craft activities could be carried out under a roof. In the past it also provided a place for drying grain during rainy weather. A central feature of the room is the massive, rough-hewn beam, the ushibari of Japanese pine, supported by posts at the boundary of the ima and doma elements of the room. The main beam in this room had been carefully preserved by the carpenters in Japan for many years until a project could be found to appropriately utilize its unique curvature. To accommodate the weight concentrated on the primary post, the daikokubashira, the layout of the room has been designed so that this main post sits directly above the building's existing superstructure. The major posts are made of zelkova, (keyaki), a hardwood with a distinctive grain pattern. The other beams are made of American pine. The posts and beams are connected without nails, using traditional joinery techniques. The ceiling is of bamboo with joined beams which would have allowed for the circulation of warm air from fireplaces below. The walls mimics the typical mud plaster walls through the use of textured wallpaper and wooden wainscoting for greater durability. The bay window is a structure not in keeping with traditional Japanese design and has been masked with panels that suggest shôji, sliding doors of lattice frames, covered with translucent paper. The ima is suggested with a plank wood floor covering the largest portion of the room. The floor toward the front of the room is made of a simulated earthen material to represent a portion of the doma where it meets the ima's wooden floor. Although the traditional design would call for the wooden floor to be much higher than the dirt floor, this feature has been eliminated in the classroom for practicality. Located on the rear wall, is the tokonoma, a raised alcove for the display of treasured objects, flower arrangements, and seasonal decorations. The tokonoma has been built in shoin-style, with shôji along its exterior side. The corner post, tokobashira, is made of ebony and the floor of the tokonoma is tatami. The display cases at the rear of the room and along the interior wall contain artifacts in keeping with the period and include a chagama and furo, an iron kettle with metal charcoal hearth/brazier combination, used in the "tea ceremony". While typical minka would have no chairs at all, in keeping with its function as a classroom, the classroom has wooden chairs designed and crafted specifically for students and are consistent in design with the rest of the room. Sliding wooden panels cover the blackboard at the front of the room. The interior surface of the entry door has been modified with a wooden treatment that suggests the sliding door that was the typical entrance to a house of this period.

=== Korean ===
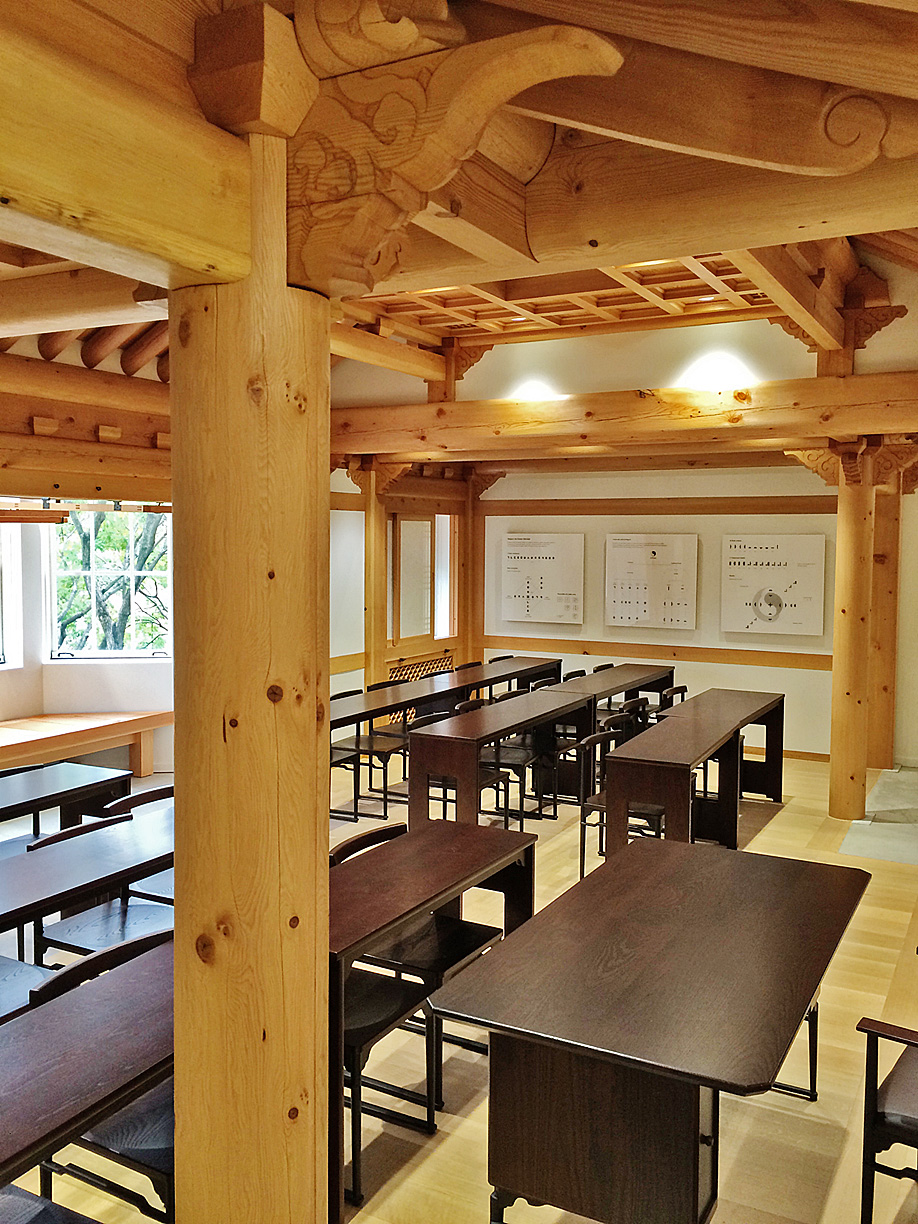
The Korean Classroom

Korean Classroom
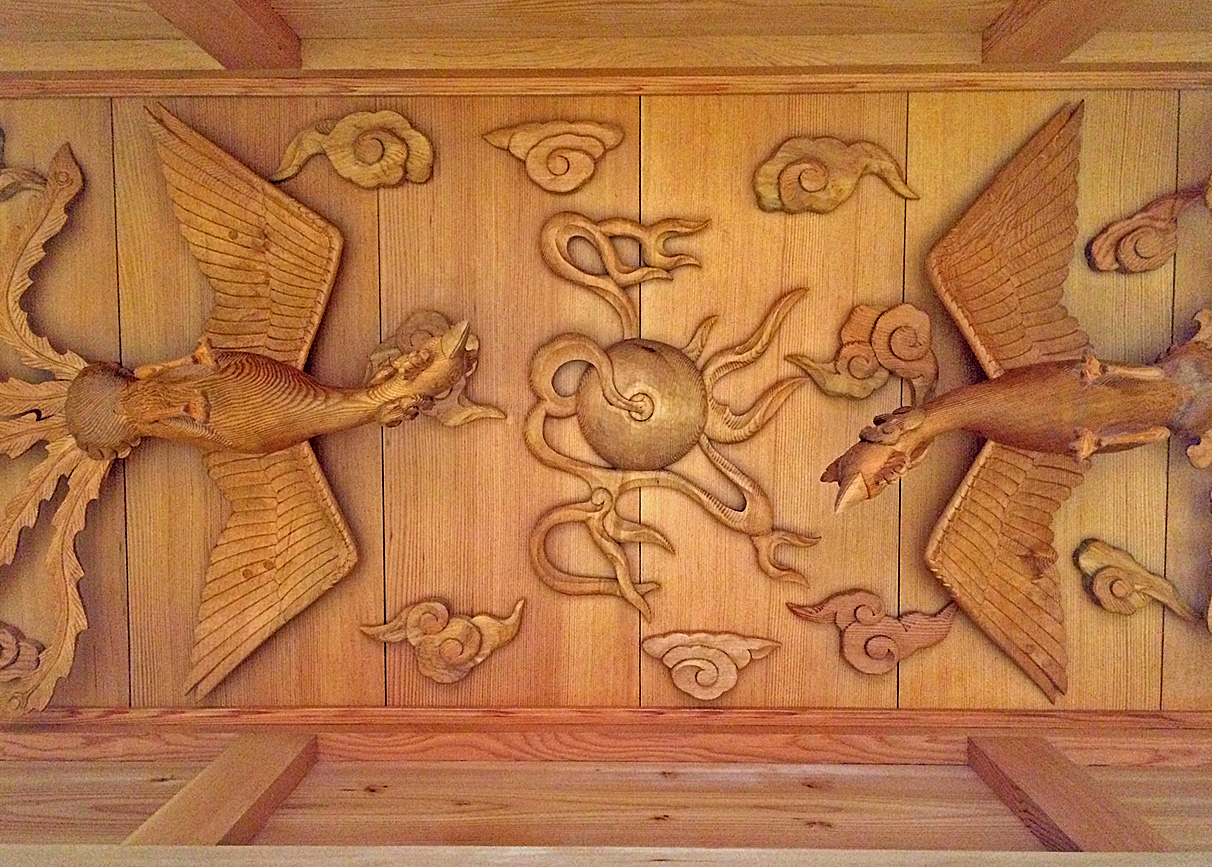
- Location: Room 304
- Dedicated: November 15, 2015
- Style: Joseon Dynasty
- Architect: Minah Lee, Seoul

The Korean Nationality Room is based on the 14th century Myeong-nyundang (Hall of Enlightenment), the main building at the Sungkyunkwan in Seoul which served as Korea's royal academy during the Goryeo and Joseon dynasties from 918 to 1897. The room mimics the three connected rooms of the Myeong-nyundan with twin oak columns forming a symbolic boundary and a central room featuring a lofted ceiling that contains two hand-carved phoenixes facing a symbolic pearl of wisdom, a design inspired by the royal palace of the Joseon Dynasty.

The room was primarily built off-site in Korea, disassembled, and shipped to Pittsburgh, where it was reassembled in the Cathedral of Learning by Korean carpenters who kept with traditional Korean building practices of not using nails or screws in construction. The room features hand cut and hand engraved Douglas fir and red pine logs from South Korea that include swirling engraved designs based on traditional Korean architecture. Windows are covered with a specially produced paper product made of mulberry tree fiber. A symbolic back door leading to a windowed bay that faces Heinz Chapel alludes to a door in the Myeong-nyudang which leads to the Sungkyunkwan's courtyard. The south wall displays three documents that explain the letters and principles of the Hangul, or Korean alphabet, which was created by the court of Sejong the Great in 1443. A display niche to the right of the classrooms blackboards contains a book illustrating Crown Prince Hyomyeong's matriculation to Sungkyunkwan in 1817, while another niche displays the Four Treasures of the Study: brush, ink, paper and ink-stone. Furnishings include freestanding, hard-oak desks by Korean designer Ji-hoon Ha that accommodate two to three students and are specifically designed for laptops. The room also contains an 85-inch, 3-D LED screen and central speaker system and is the first nationality room to be constructed with such technology.

=== Lithuanian ===
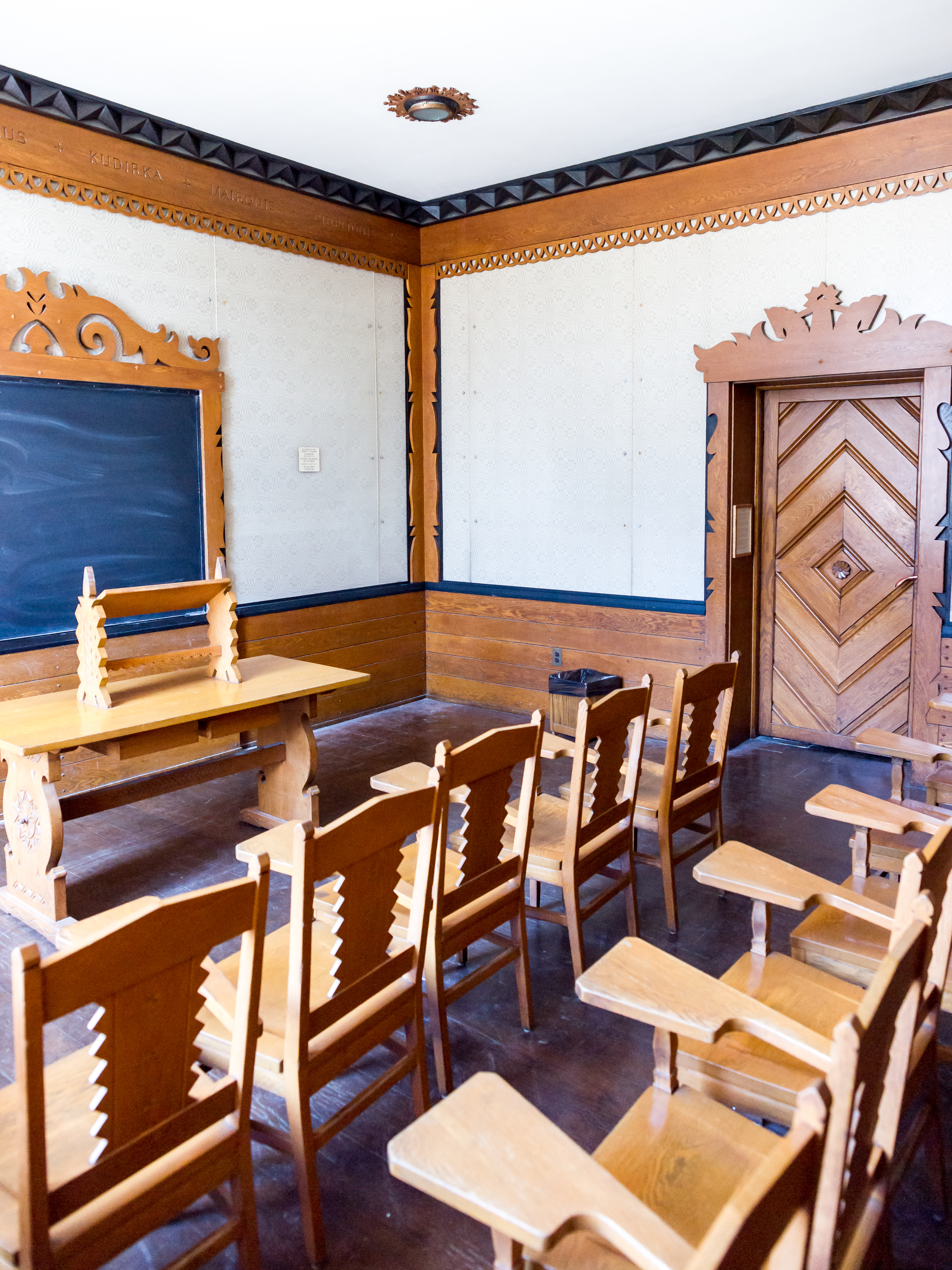
The Lithuanian Classroom

Lithuanian Classroom
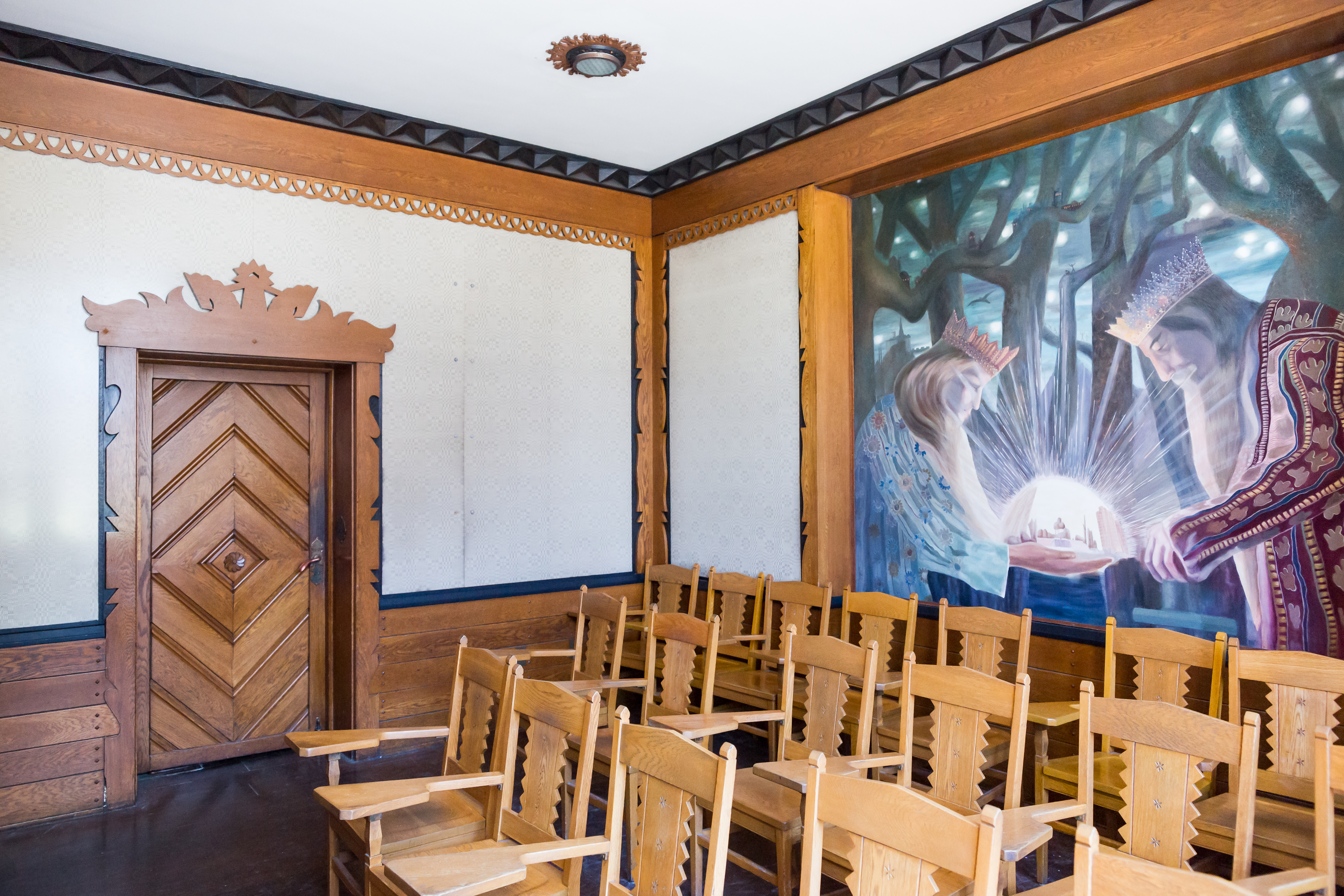
- Location: Room 129
- Dedicated: October 4, 1940
- Style: Folk Motif
- Architect: Antanas Gudaitis, Kaunas

The Lithuanian Classroom is dominated by a fresco depicting Mikalojus Konstantinas Čiurlionis' famous painting The Two Kings, which portrays the reverence Lithuanians have for their villages. This mural sets the tone for a room that pays tribute to the symbolism and love of nature and home reflected in Lithuanian folk art. The door's wooden planks are laid in a diamond pattern similar to those of many farm structures. At the center of the door is a carved rosette, symbol of fire. Above the entrance, a stylized sun between two horses' heads represents light and sound believed to ward off evil spirits. The white oak molding of intersecting scallops resembles decorations found on farm granaries or kleitis. Names of famous Lithuanians are carved on the frieze above the blackboard. The wall fabric is linen woven in a design called "The Path of the Birds". Its frame is of white oak and rare bog oak that acquires its deep hue while submerged in a marshy bog for decades. Lithuanian farmers would thus preserve prime trees in order to make furniture pieces that were treasured as heirlooms. The professor's desk is modeled after a household table and the lectern incorporates details of a spinning wheel spindle. Student chairs are carved with a design found on household utensils. The radiator enclosure is perforated with a design of wild rue leaves, a Lithuanian national emblem. Traditionally, a bride is crowned with a wreath of rue, symbol of chastity. Windows of handpressed glass bear leaded medallions in the form of sun ornaments often found on roadside shrines.

=== Norwegian ===
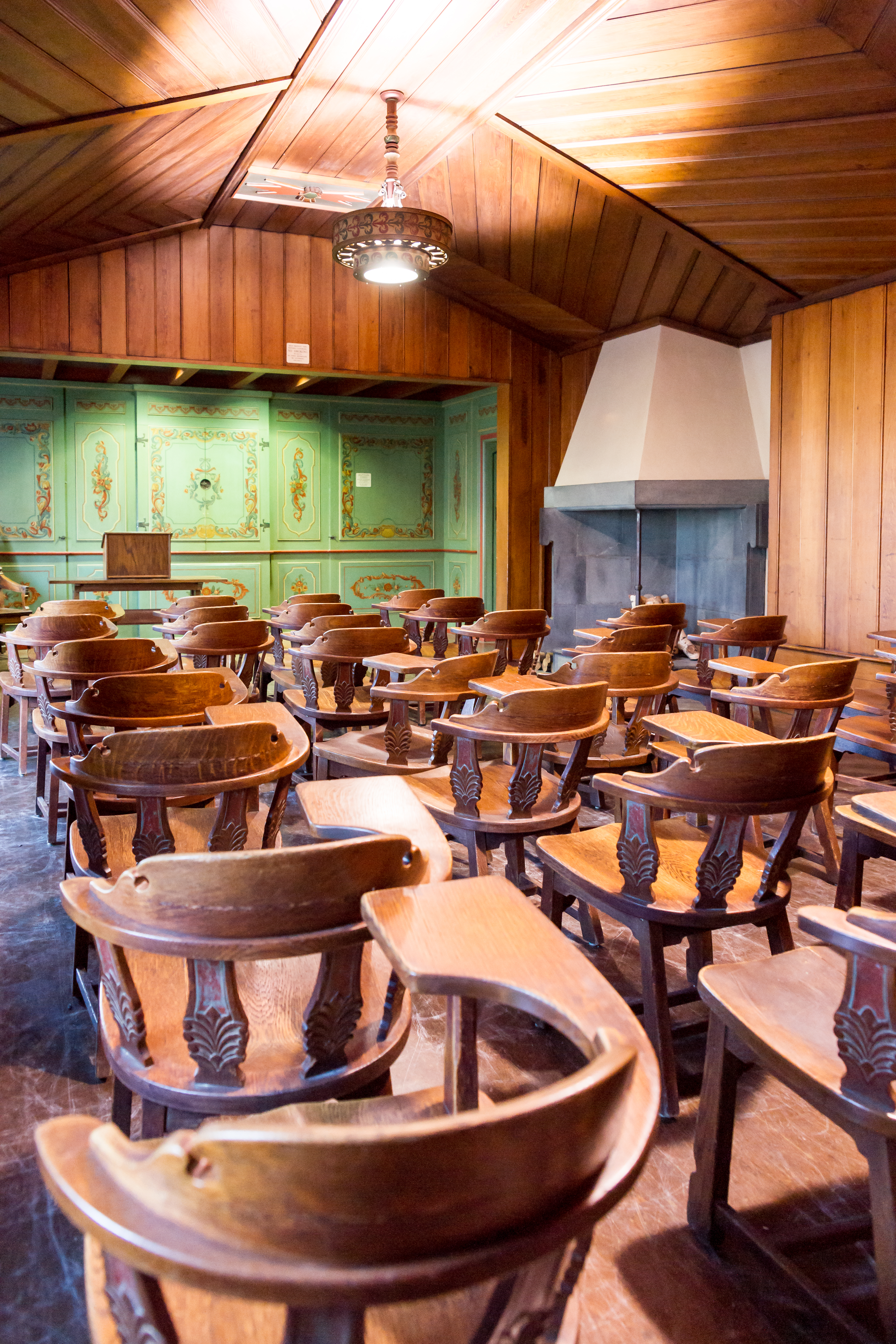
The Norwegian Classroom

Norwegian Classroom
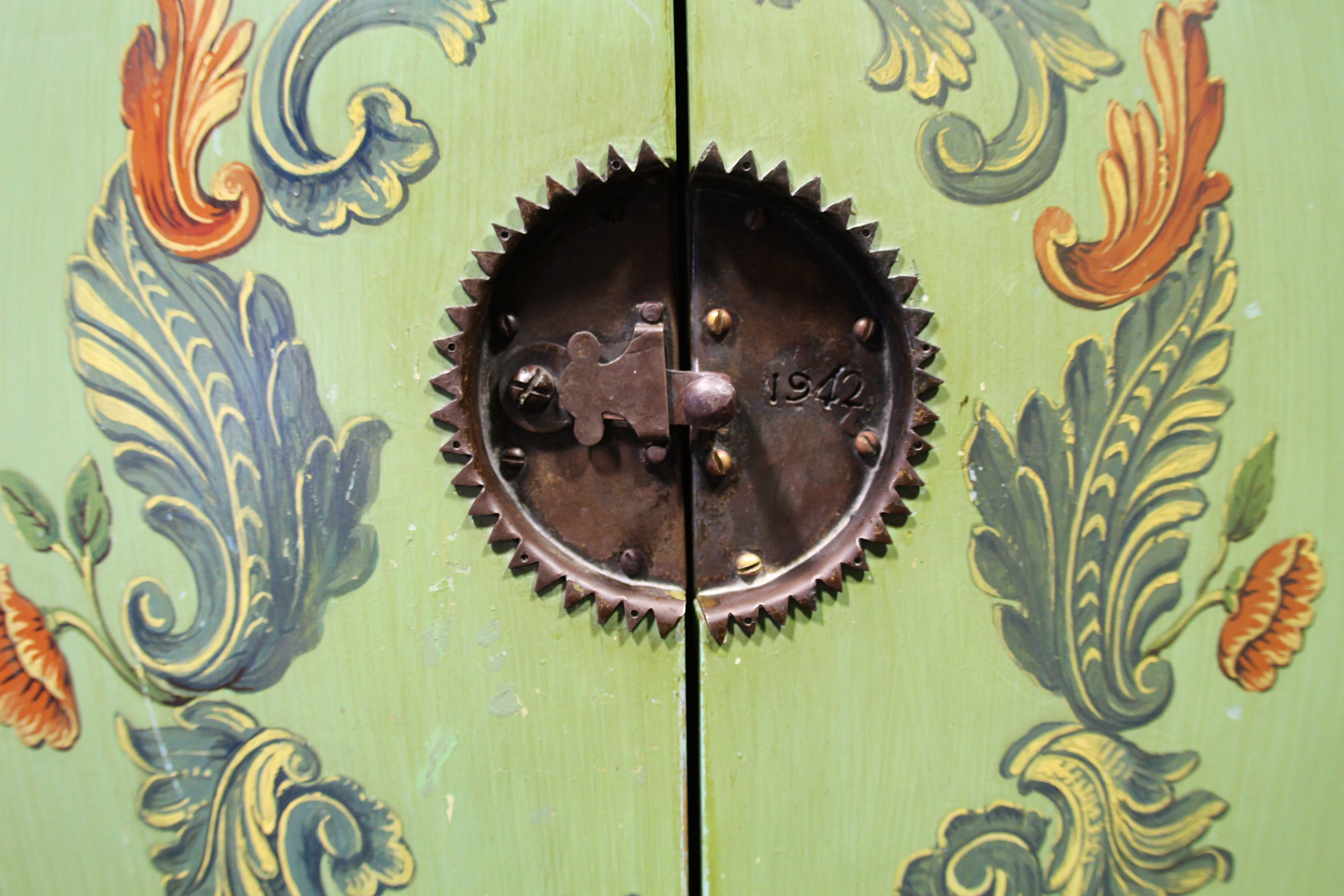
- Location: Room 151
- Dedicated: May 15, 1948
- Style: Folk Motif
- Architect: Georg Eliassen, Oslo

The Norwegian Classroom was designed in Oslo in an 18th-century peasant style using Norwegian building techniques, painted decoration, and craftsmanship by architect Georg Eliassen just prior to the outbreak of World War II. Plans for the room were sent on the last ship to leave Petsamo for the United States where they were completed by University Architect Albert A. Klimcheck. Walls of the main space are paneled with vertical overlapping spruce boards hand-rubbed with wax. The walls in the front of the room are painted a soft blue and decorated with floral designs reminiscent of the 18th century rosemaling technique.

Because living and bedrooms were often merged into one room during this era, two of the panels swing open as if they would reveal traditional built-in-beds, but instead conceal the blackboard. The room features high-sloped ceilings reflective of those in Nordic peasant homes that keep snow from accumulating during the severe winters. Spruce boards are laid in a herringbone pattern slanting upward to a plane of flat boards decorated by two hand-carved, painted rosettes with a symbol for the midnight sun. Wooden chandeliers bearing a painted design incorporating "1945", the year the room was opened, hang from the flat surfaces. The professor's section of the room has a low raftered ceiling.

The transition between the two parts of the room is indicated by a corner kleberstone fireplace in which birch logs were burned standing on end to assure that smoke would rise up the chimney. Windows are of handmade opalescent glass tinted pale yellow. Since a bay window is not a Scandinavian tradition, the area is plastered, paved with slate, and treated as a traditional alcove. The student tablet armchairs are low-backed and the professor's chair is of a typical Viking design with carved heads of beasts and an intertwining dragon motif that traditionally serves as a symbol that protects against evil.

The room features a century-old grandfather clock with an engraved dial and a case that is painted to match the wall decorations of the smaller room. Above the rear wall bench and flanked by corner display cabinets decorated with rosemaling, hangs a framed copy of a 1695 Norwegian woolen tapestry depicting the Biblical parable of the five wise and five foolish virgins.

=== Philippine ===
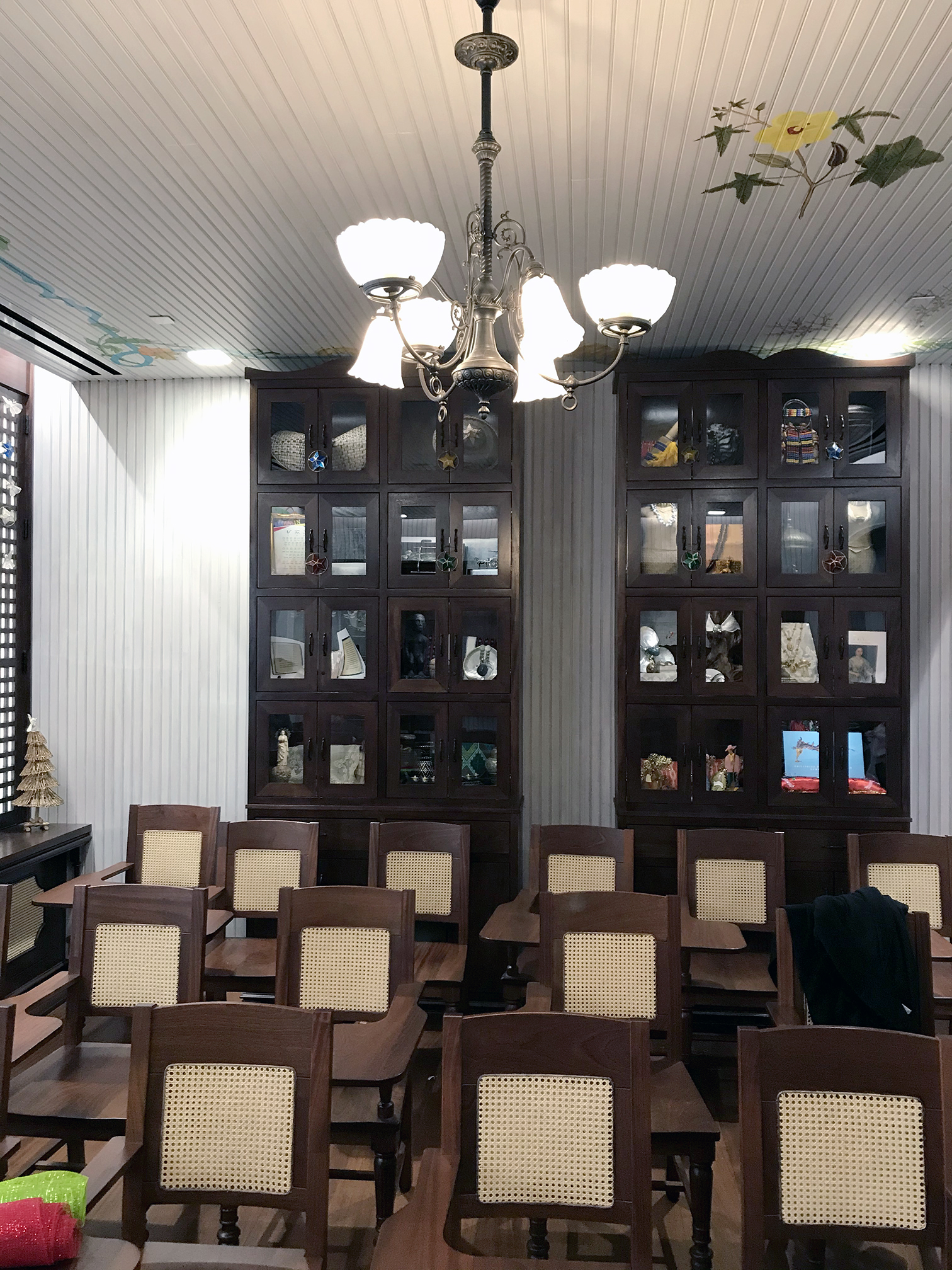
The Philippine Classroom

Philippine Classroom
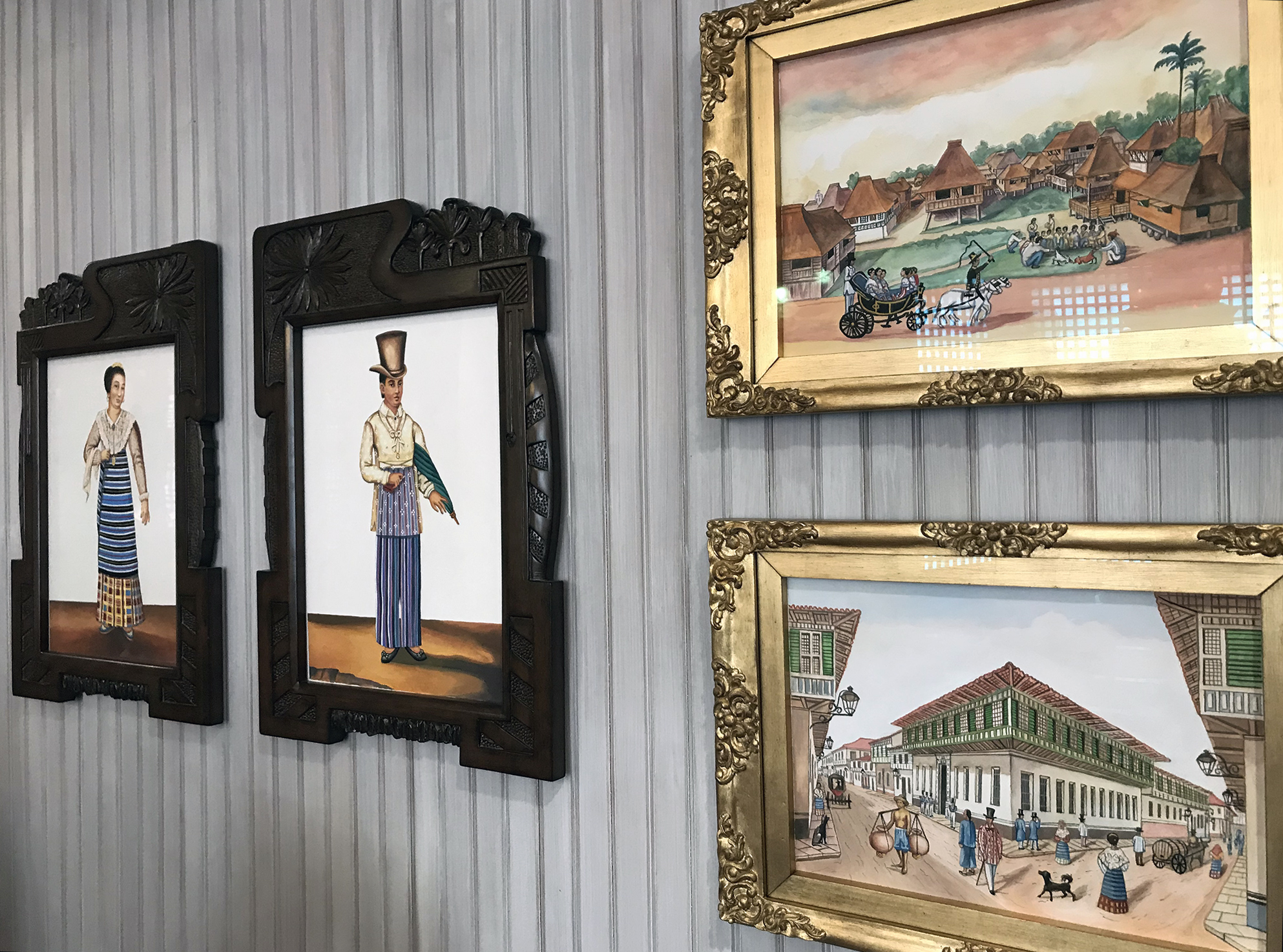
- Location: Room 313
- Dedicated: June 9, 2019
- Style: Báhay na bató
- Architect: Warren Bulseco, U.S., and Melinda Minerva “Popi” Laudico, Philippines

The Philippine Nationality Room began construction on May 3, 2018, overcoming a prior hold on the project since 2011. The design of the Philippine room is based on a traditional bahay na bato. Meaning "house of stone", bahay na bato is a long-lasting type of home that became popular in the Philippines during the years of Spanish rule (mid-1500s to 1898). The room is particularly based on the interiors of the Quema House in the city of Vigan. The Philippine Nationality Room was designed by Pittsburgh architect Warren Bulseco and Philippine architect Melinda Minerva “Popi” Laudico. Professor Fernando Zialcita, a noted authority on Philippine ancestral houses from Ateneo de Manila University, served as adviser to the project. Filipino-American artist Eliseo Art Silva created paintings for the room.

The room features lattice-patterned windows using capiz shells, a popular alternative to glass in the Philippines. The chairs are backed with solihiya, rattan woven into a sunburst pattern. An etched silver Murano mirror from Europe and a bronze chandelier from the United States highlight the role of imported design in Filipino culture. The seals of the four oldest educational institutions in the Philippines (San Carlos, Santa Isabel, Santo Tomas, San Juan de Letran) are featured on the chalkboard covers.

Other artifacts showcase pre-Colonial cultures. The Agusan image is a Hindu sculpture viewed by the Manobo tribe as a protective nature spirit. The Manunggul Jar, excavated from a Neolithic burial site in Palawan, depicts human figures traveling in a boat to the afterlife. The room's ceremonial key, designed by Christopher Purpura, incorporates mythological figures from the Meranao people of Mindanao—the serpent Naga and the bird Sarimanok.

=== Polish ===
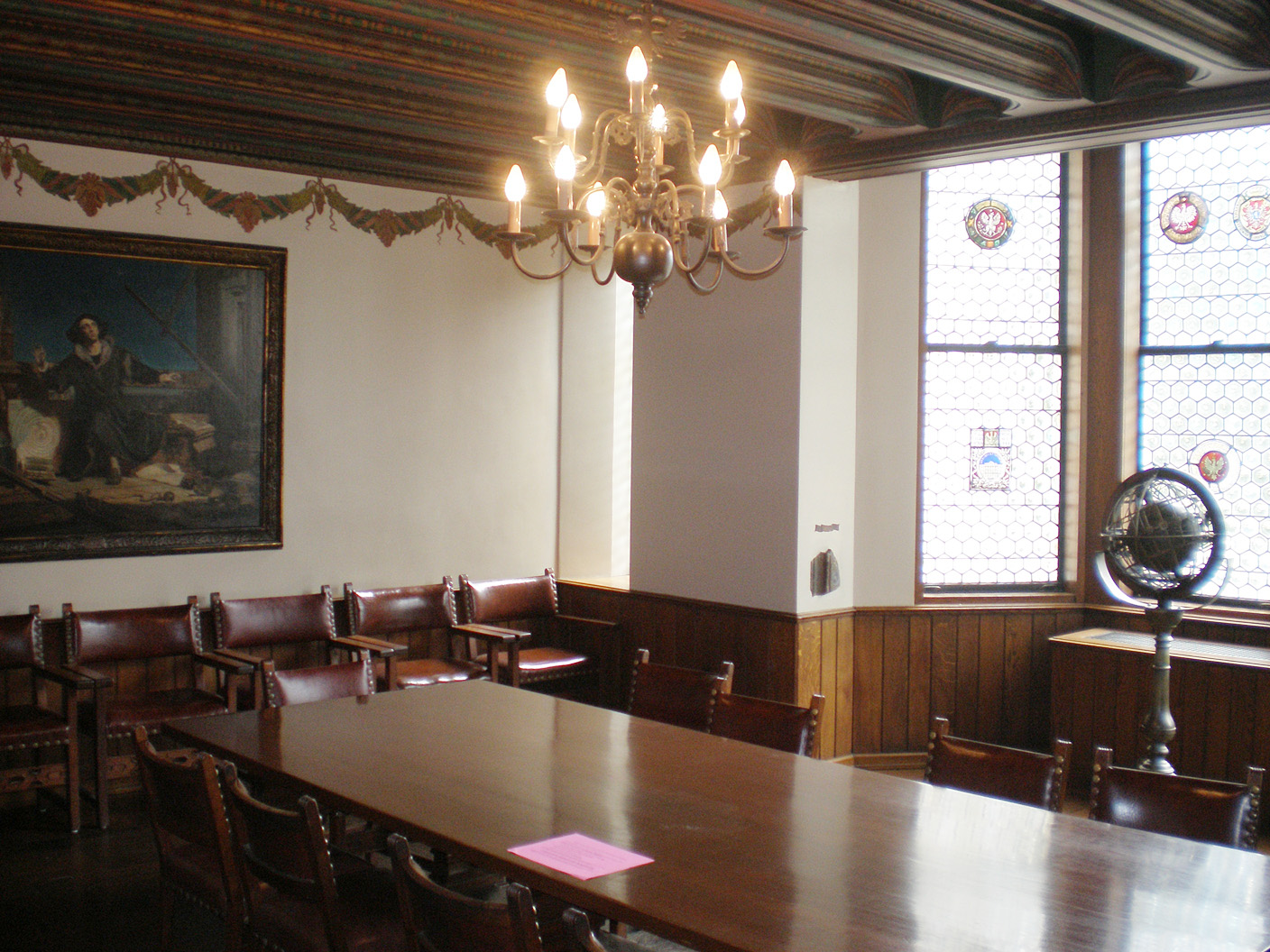
The Polish Classroom

Polish Classroom
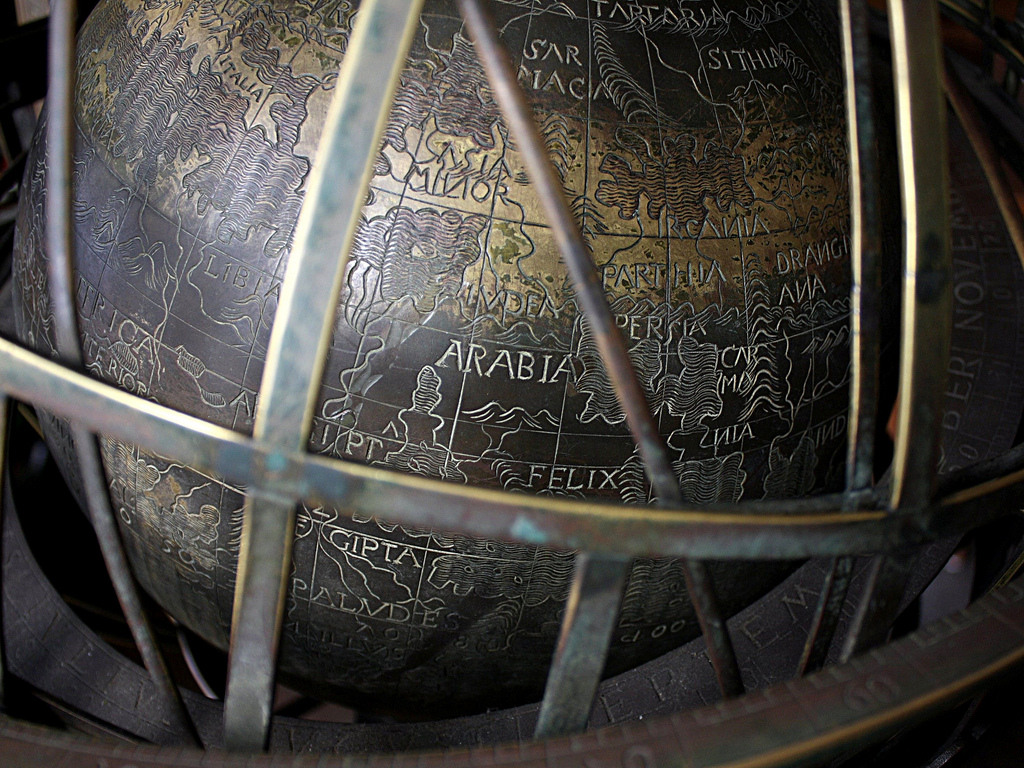
- Location: Room 126
- Dedicated: February 16, 1940
- Style: 16th-century Polish Renaissance
- Architect: Adolf Szyszko-Bohusz, Kraków

The Polish Classroom was inspired by rooms in Kraków's Wawel Castle, for centuries the residence of kings. The Polish astronomer Nicolaus Copernicus, and the science that his theories revolutionized, are also a major theme of the room. A replica of the famous Jan Matejko portrait of Copernicus shows him as a young man pursuing his study of the universe from a workshop on the roof of his uncle's house in Allenstein (Olsztyn). In the bay stands an enlarged replica of the 16th-century Jagiellonian globe, one of the oldest existing globes to depict North America as a separate continent. The original globe was only eight inches high and was designed to operate as a clock and calendar. It took a metalsmith in Kraków five years to complete the large globe in this room.

Artists from Kraków also came to Pittsburgh to paint the ceiling of 18-foot (5.5 m) beams with informal geometric Renaissance decorations. The room is illuminated by a bronze chandelier bearing a stylized Polish eagle. The walnut seminar table was copied from one in a state dining room at Wawel Castle. The windows combine hexagonal handmade roundels, similar to those in Wawel Castle, with stained-glass coats of arms representing Polish institutions of higher education. The cornerstone is a fragment of Gothic cornice preserved from the Collegium Maius (1369), the ancient Jagiellonian Library. Poland's music is represented by the original manuscript of Ignace Paderewski's only opera, Manru, which is displayed in the archive cabinet.

=== Romanian ===
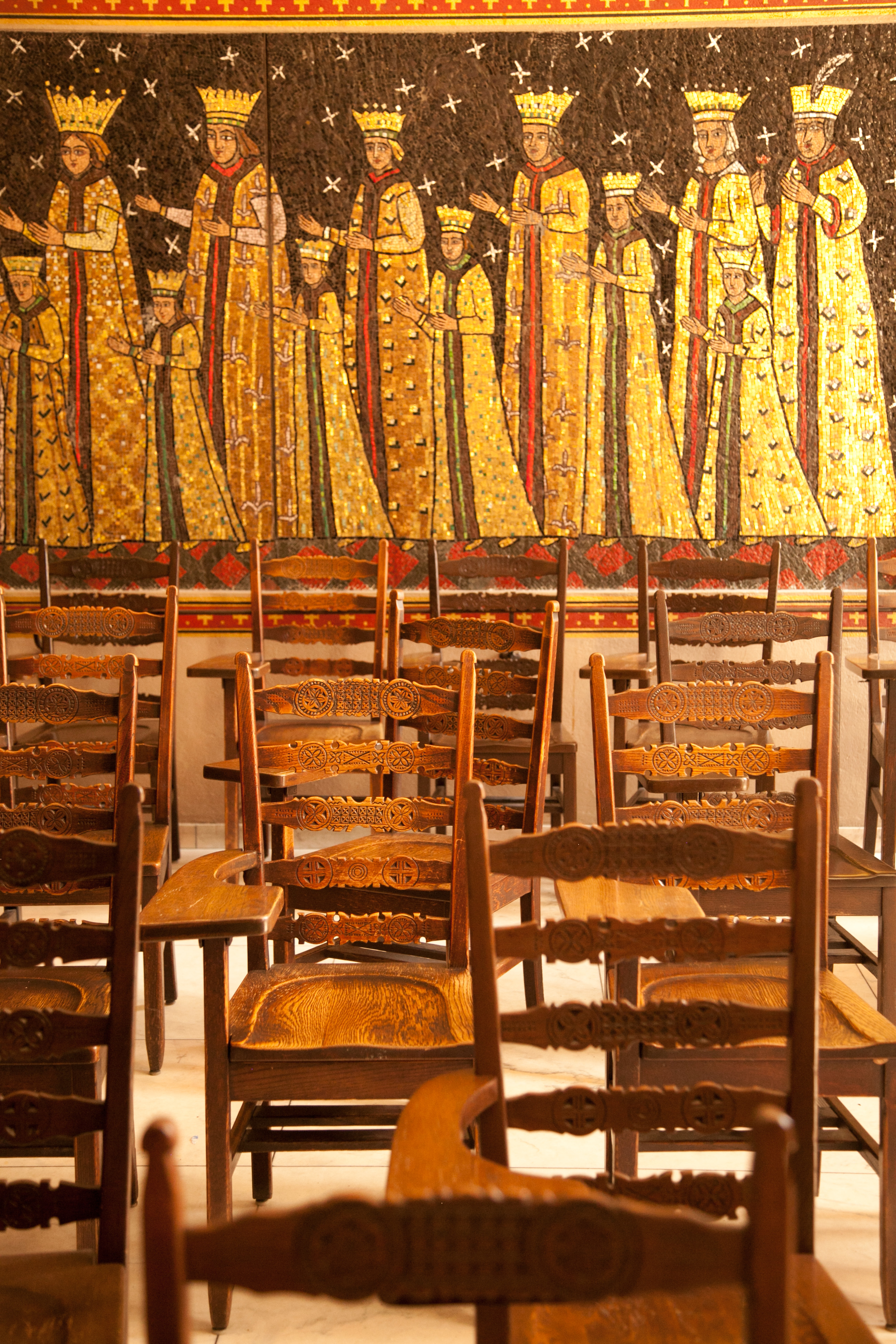
The Romanian Classroom

Romanian Classroom
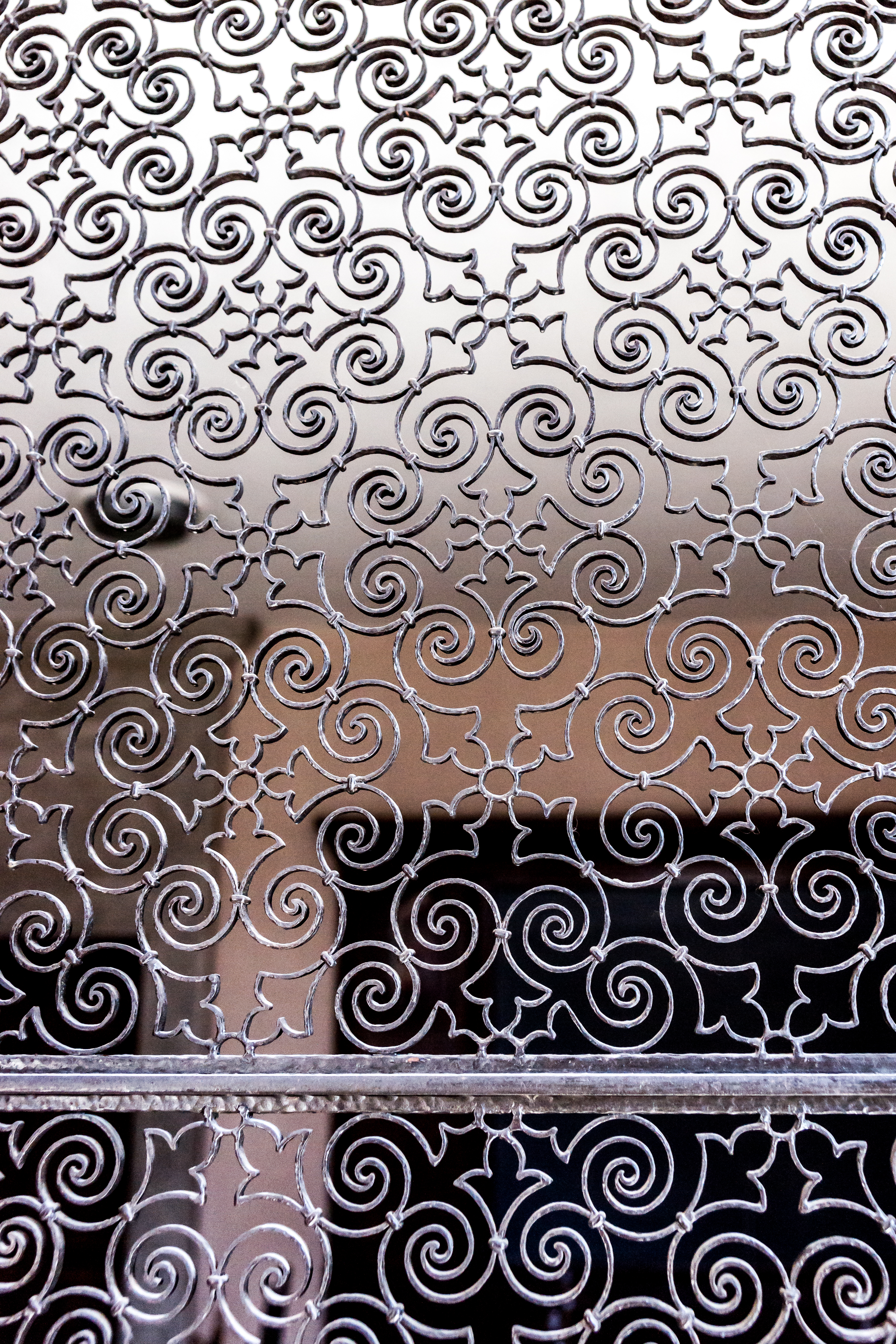
- Location: Room 130
- Dedicated: May 16, 1943
- Style: 17th century Byzantine
- Architect: N. Ghica-Budeşti, Bucharest

The Romanian Classroom was designed in Bucharest by Nicolae Ghica-Budeşti. The carved door frame is characteristic of stone thresholds of Romanian monasteries and is made is of American limestone selected due to its similarity to Romanian limestone used in the royal palace at Bucharest. The entrance door of the Romanian Classroom is ornately carved oak reminiscent of Byzantine churches in Romania. The words of Vasile Alecsandri, one of the greatest Romanian poets of the 19th century, are carved overhead in the stone door frame from his Ode to the Year 1855: "The Romanian is like the mighty rock which amidst the waves of the stormy and majestic sea forever remains unmoved." The floor is laid in square blocks of pink marble imported from quarries at Ruşchiţa. The black boards are set in arched oak panels, carved in a manner of icon screens in Eastern Orthodox and Greek Catholic Romanian churches. These are separated by carved-twisted rope which suggests the Roman origin of many of Romania's artistic traditions. Ancient original icons from Romania depicting the Virgin and Child, Christ, the Dormition of the Virgin, and Saint Mark are embedded in the upper section of each panel.

White arca paint mixed with color gives the smooth plastered walls a bluish pink tint. A Byzantine-style mosaic embedded in the rear wall, a gift of the Romanian government, was executed by Bucharest ceramicist Nora Steriade in gold, turquoise, bronze, ruby red, and black pieces of glass, and was originally part of the Romanian Pavilion at the 1939 New York World's Fair. The lettering for the inscription and for the entrance text is the work of Alexander Seceni. The mosaic depicts Constantin Brâncoveanu, Prince of Wallachia, who refused to recant the Christian faith even at the cost of his own life and the lives of the male members of his family. The six windows have rounded Romanesque heads reflecting tradition brought from Rome when they conquered the original Dacian settlers in 106 AD.

Two small window casements are deeply recessed and have marble window ledges. The four large center windows, form an alcove shut off from the main part of the room by an iron grilled gates wrought in Romania and hung in an arch. These gates swing back in folded sections against the plastered wall. A slab of polished marble tops the wrought-iron radiator grille. Yellow silk draperies frame the windows and ancient icons befitting the season and holidays are exhibited in the alcove which is reminiscent of an icon shrine in an Orthodox Church. The student chairs are of dark oak hand-carved by Romanian peasant artisans using simple pocketknives and each splat bears a different design. The professor's reading desk was adapted from an Eastern Orthodox Church lectern.

=== Russian ===
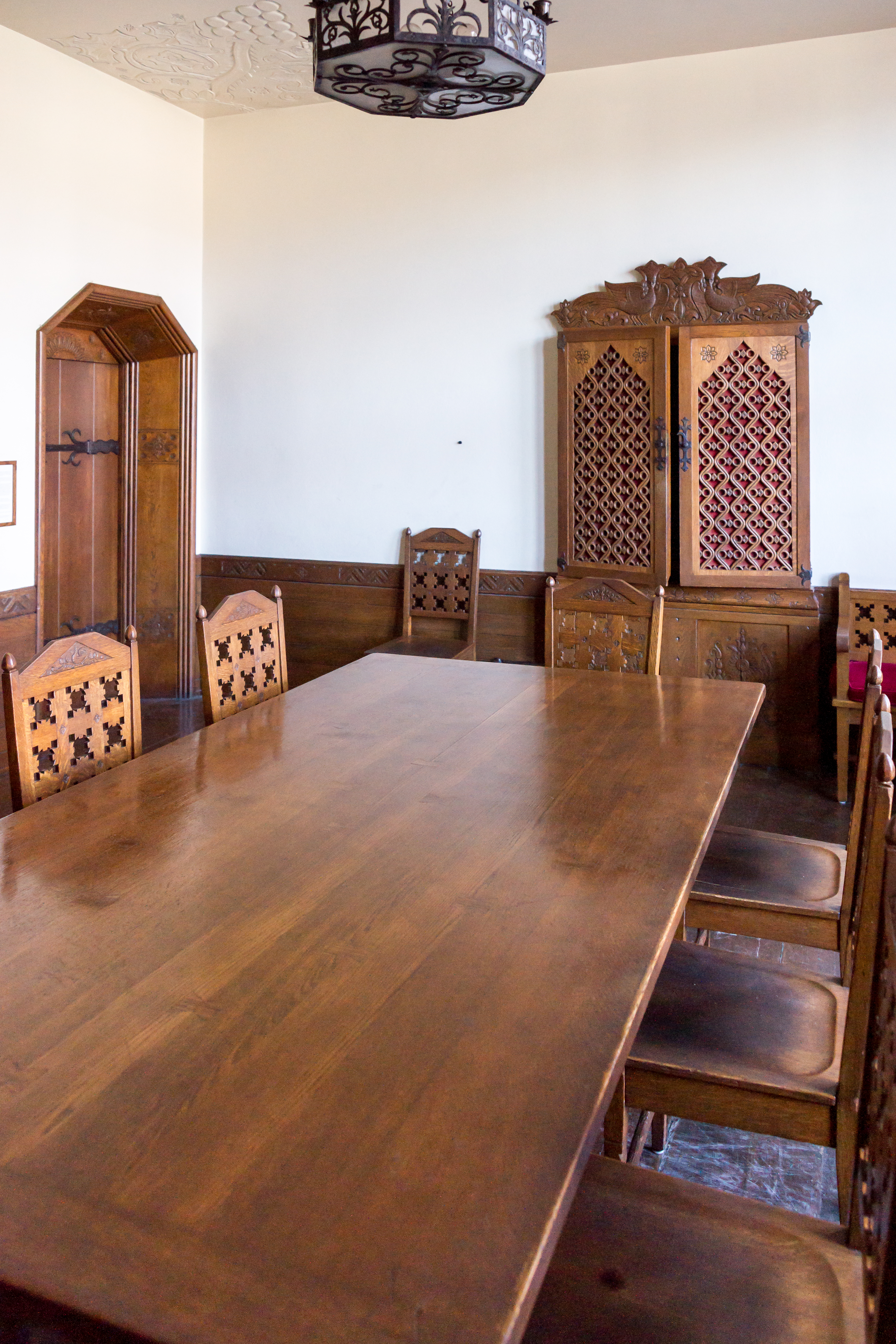
The Russian Classroom

Russian Classroom
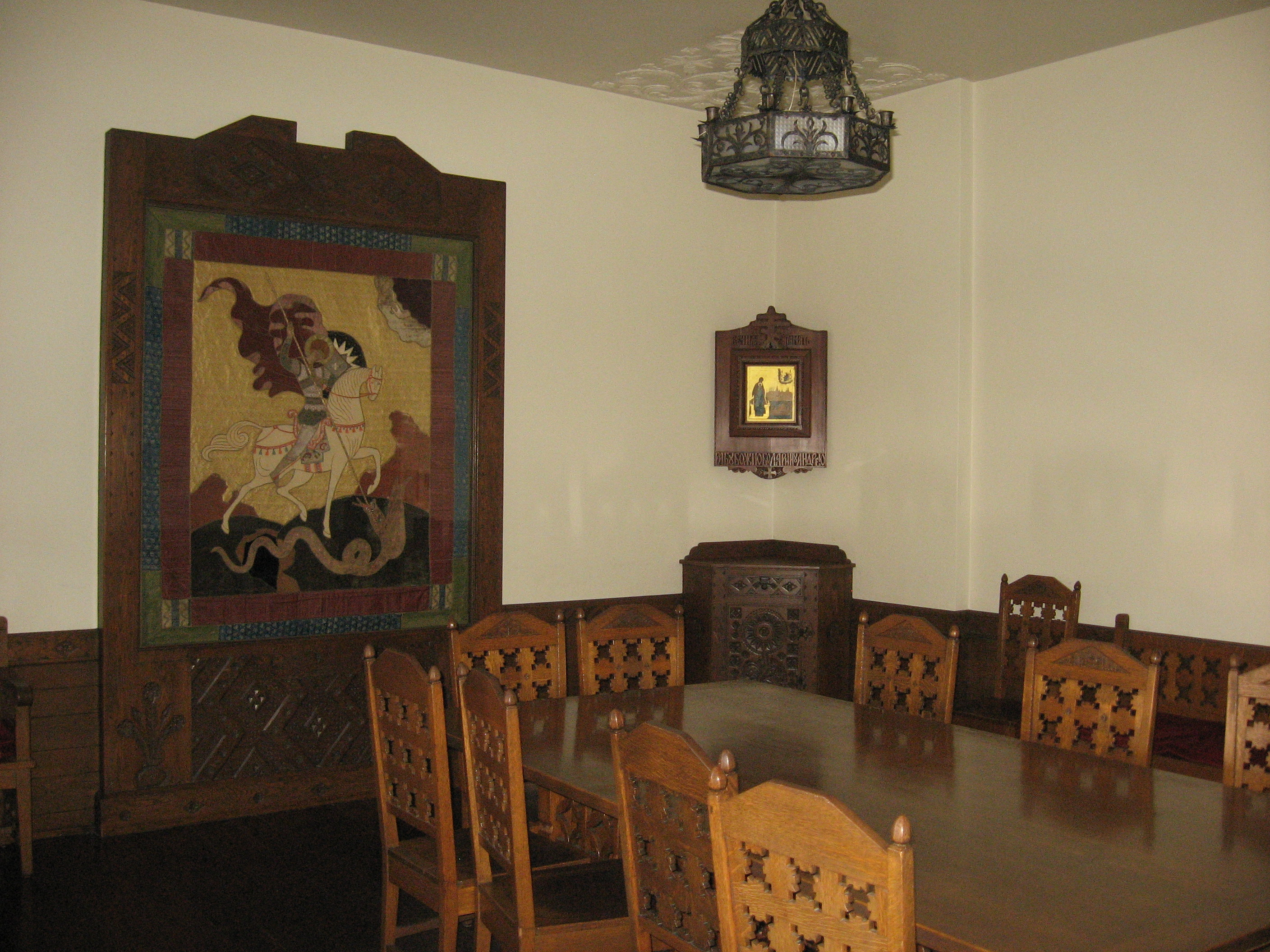
- Location: Room 153
- Dedicated: July 8, 1938
- Style: Byzantine and Folk Motifs
- Designer: Andrey Avinoff, Tultchin

The Russian Classroom contains folk ornamentation with traditional motifs from Byzantium, the spiritual center of Russia. The seminar table is made of oak slabs matched in contrasting grain and held together by ornamental keys. The cut-out apron is characteristic of massive tables in the Vologda district. The back of each student's chair has a cruciform circle pattern surmounted by triangles carved with symbols of regional or stylistic significance including the reindeer which symbolizes the tundra and the sturgeon that represents the Volga River. The professor's chair has a back of spirals surmounted by two peacocks worshipping the tree of life. The podium is ecclesiastic in character and suggests the analoi used in Orthodox churches to support heavy Bibles. The blackboard is patterned after a triptych, or three-leafed frame which holds icons.

The doors of the blackboard are a grille of wooden spirals backed by red velvet. Above them is a carved panel with Sirin and Alcanost, the twin birds of Russian folklore that depict joy and sorrow as indistinguishable. A dado or low wainscot of simple horizontal oaken boards surrounds the room and incorporates the blackboard, the corner cupboard, and kiot which is a Slavic term for a wall frame treated as a piece of furniture. Within the kiot hangs a vishivka (appliqué and embroidery) banner of Saint George, patron saint of Moscow since the 15th century. The banner was made with pieces of 16th and 17th century fabric from Venice and Paris and is an example of needlework once popular with the Russian aristocracy. The words "Valorous youth victorious over forces of evil and darkness" are carved in both Russian and English below the banner. A copy of the Avinoff family icon in the room depicts the miraculous saving of the city of Kitej from a Tartar invasion in the 14th century. The ceiling is cornered with designs resembling those used to form traditional Easter cakes and which symbolize the four seasons, with a bud for Spring, a sunflower for summer, grapes for Autumn, and a pine cone for Winter. A wrought iron chandelier was created by Russian-born Hyman Blum.

Following a visit from Dmitry Medvedev in 2009, a display cabinet with carved ornamentation matching the rooms original carvings was installed to house three gifts presented by the then Russian president.

=== Scottish ===
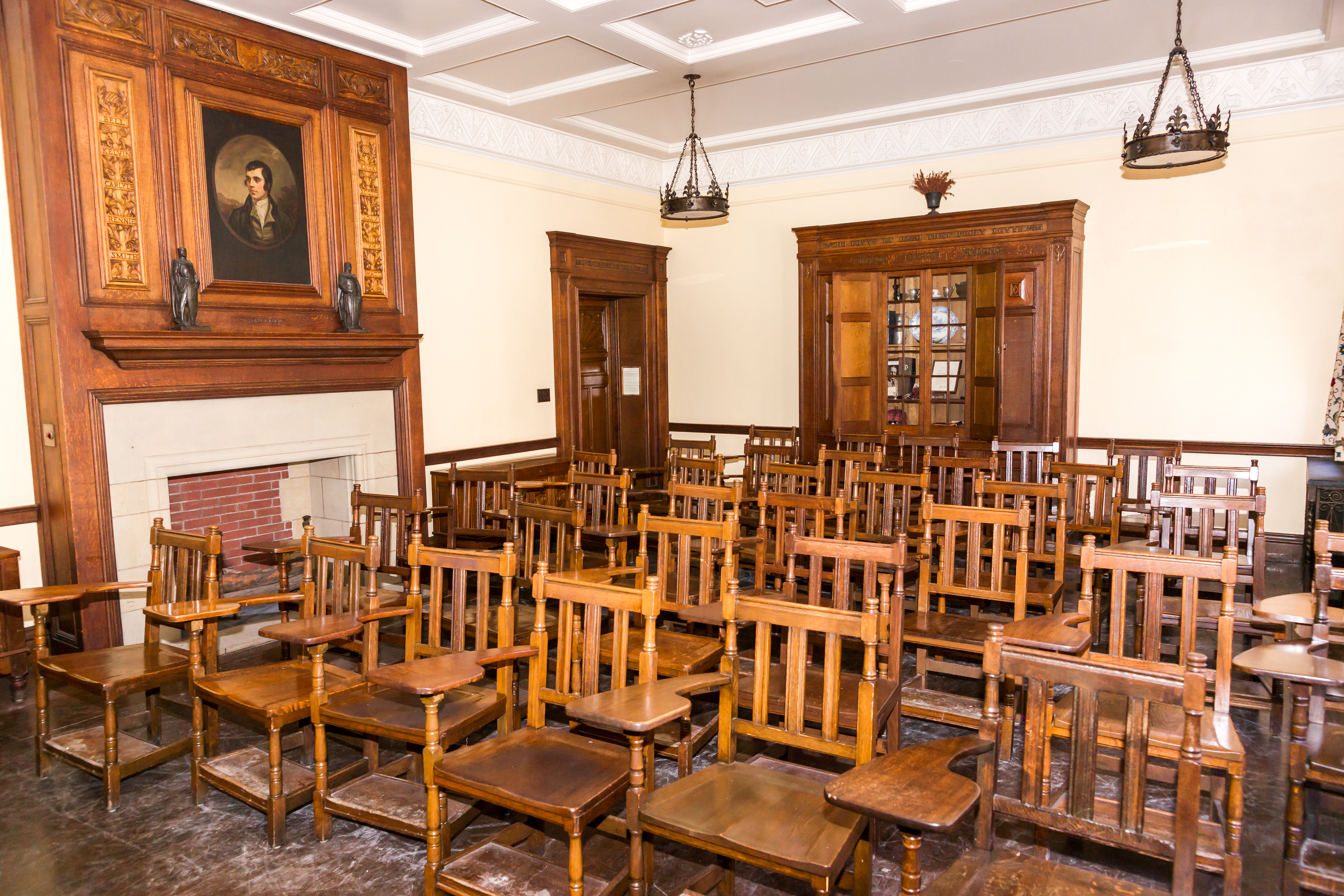
The Scottish Classroom

Scottish Classroom
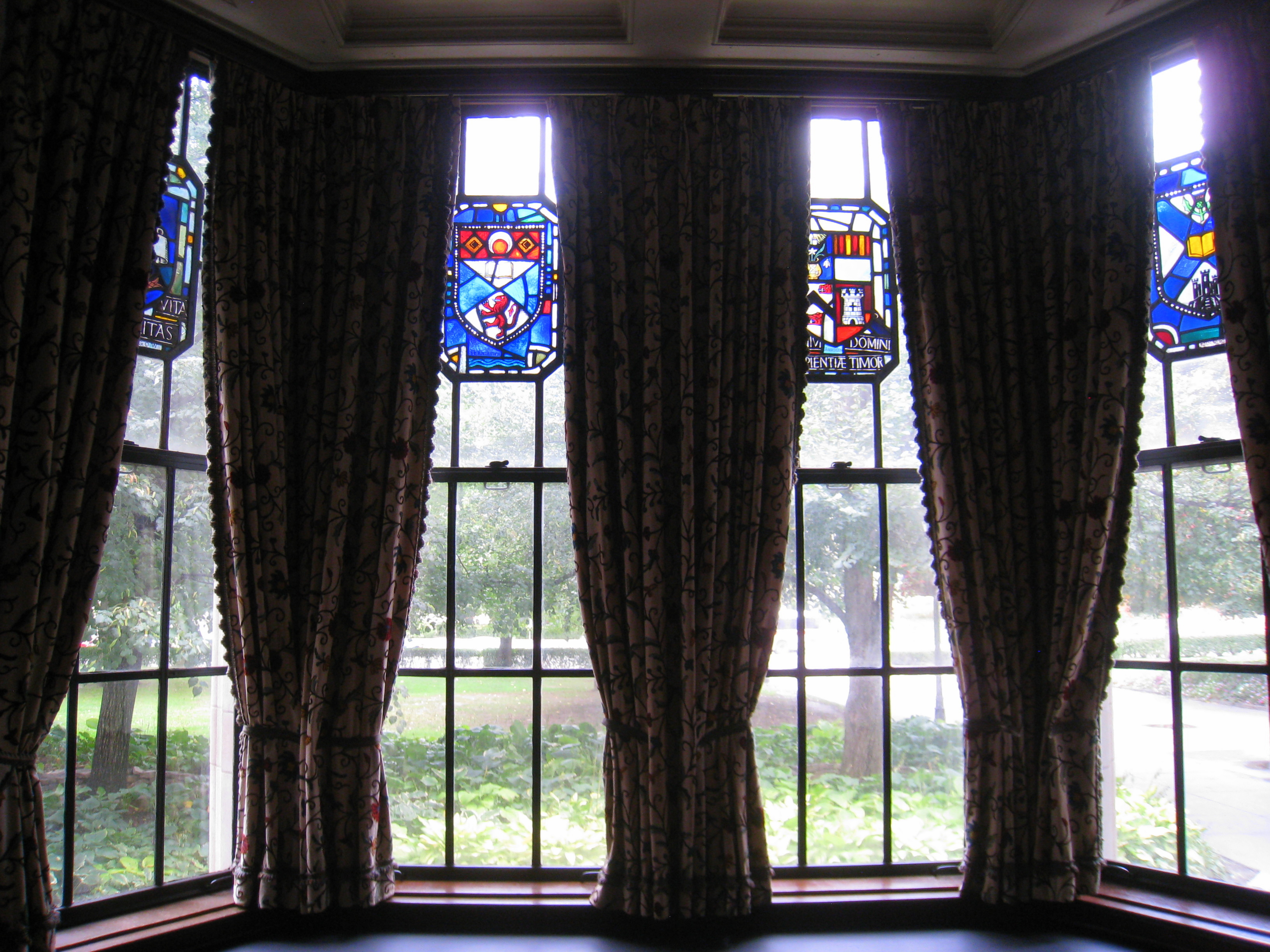
- Location: Room 139
- Dedicated: July 8, 1938
- Style: 17th century
- Architect: Reginald Fairlie, Edinburgh

The Scottish Classroom was designed by Reginald Fairlie of Edinburgh in the period style of the early 17th century. The woodwork is carefully selected and treated English pollard oak. The names of distinguished Scots are carved in the ribbon bands of the panels and include David Livingstone who was an African missionary and explorer, Robert Louis Stevenson who authored Treasure Island, and Alexander Fleming who discovered penicillin. The inscriptions above the doors and the rear cabinet are from "The Brus" by the 14th-century Scottish poet John Barbour. The room's oak doors were copied from the entrance of Rowallan Castle in Ayrshire. A 16th-century Scottish proverb above the blackboard was taken from the Cowgate in Edinburgh and is known as "the Scottish Golden Rule" which reads: "Gif Ye did as Ye sould Ye might haif as Ye would." The plaster frieze was adapted from the plaster frieze at Elcho Castle in Perthshire and incorporates symbols of 14 Scottish clans which had members on the room committee, such as the buckle of the Leslie Clan. The thistle, Scotland's national flower, is rendered on the cornerstone as a tree-of-life. The overmantel of the Scottish sandstone fireplace that is flanked by carved kists, or log storage chests, is dominated by a portrait of poet Robert Burns that is copied from an original by Alexander Nasmyth which hangs in the National Portrait Gallery of Scotland. Above the portrait is the cross of St. Andrew, Scotland's patron saint. The bronze statuettes on the mantel near an arrangement of dried heather are miniature replicas of heroic statues at the gateway to Edinburgh Castle and represent the 13th-century patriot Sir William Wallace and the 14th century freedom fighter, Robert the Bruce, both of whom were popularized in the movie Braveheart.

Medallions in the bay windows represent the coats of arms of the four ancient Scottish universities: Glasgow, St. Andrew's, Aberdeen, and Edinburgh. The medallions in the front and rear windows are of Elgin and Melrose Abbeys which were 13th and 16th century seats of learning. The draperies are of crewel-embroidered linen. The rooms lighting fixtures were inspired by an iron coronet in Edinburgh's John Knox Museum that was retrieved from the battlefield of Bannockburn at which Scotland won its independence from England in 1314. Student's seats resemble a chair that belonged to John Knox. An old Scottish church furnished the pattern for the reading stand. The rear cabinet, based on an aumbry or weapon closet, contain artifacts such as pewter and china used at Soutar's Inn in Ayrshire that was frequented by Robert Burns. The panels in the doors, mantel, and in-the-wall cabinets were carved in Edinburgh by Thomas Good and then shipped to Pittsburgh. The cabinetwork was done in the shops of Gustav Ketterer of Philadelphia. Wrought ironwork was done by Samuel Yellin. Cut into stone above the doorways are the thistle and the Lion Rampant, the Scottish emblem incorporated into Britain's royal arms. The chairman of the original Scottish Classroom Committee was Jock Sutherland.

=== Swedish ===
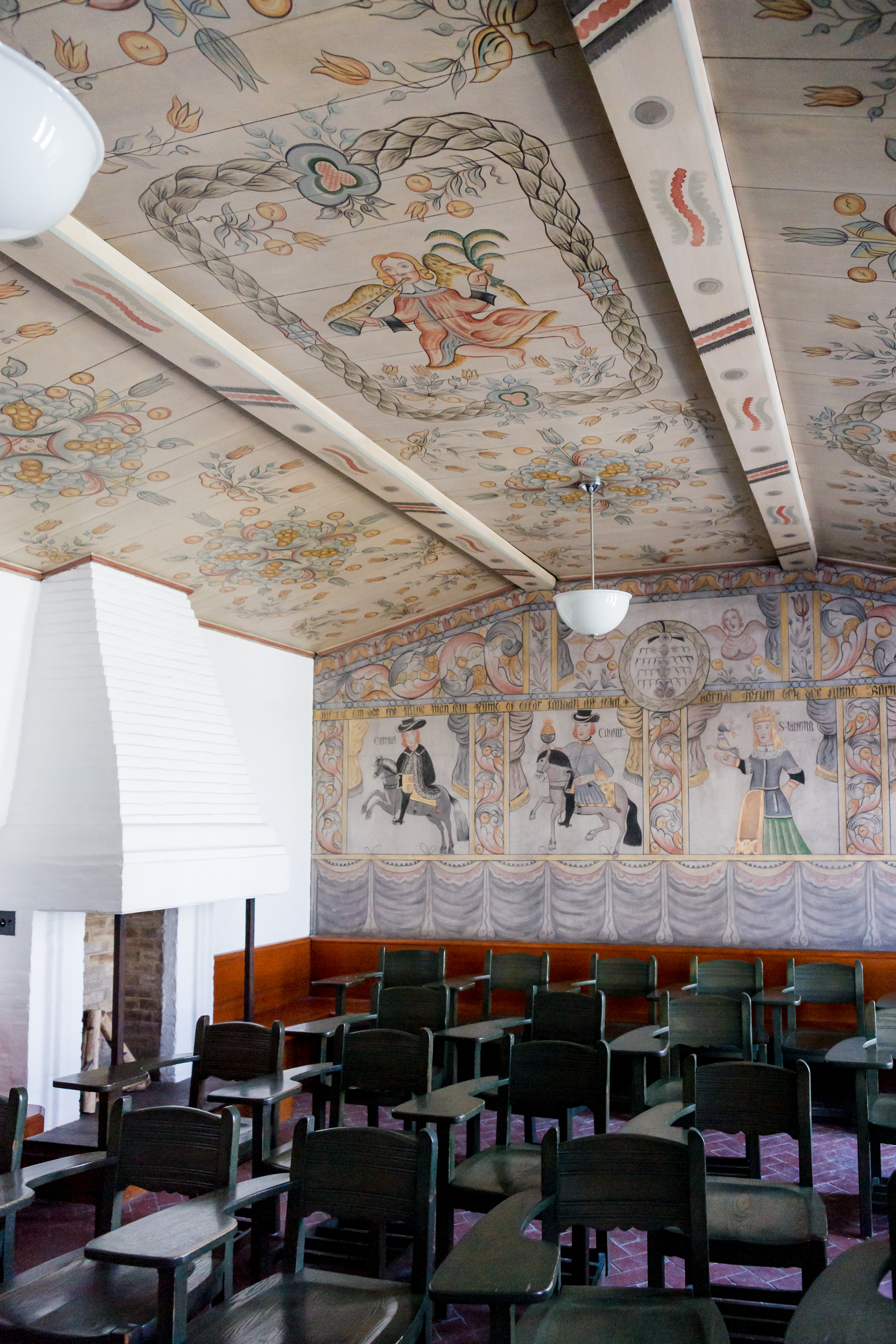
Swedish Nationality Room.

Swedish Classroom
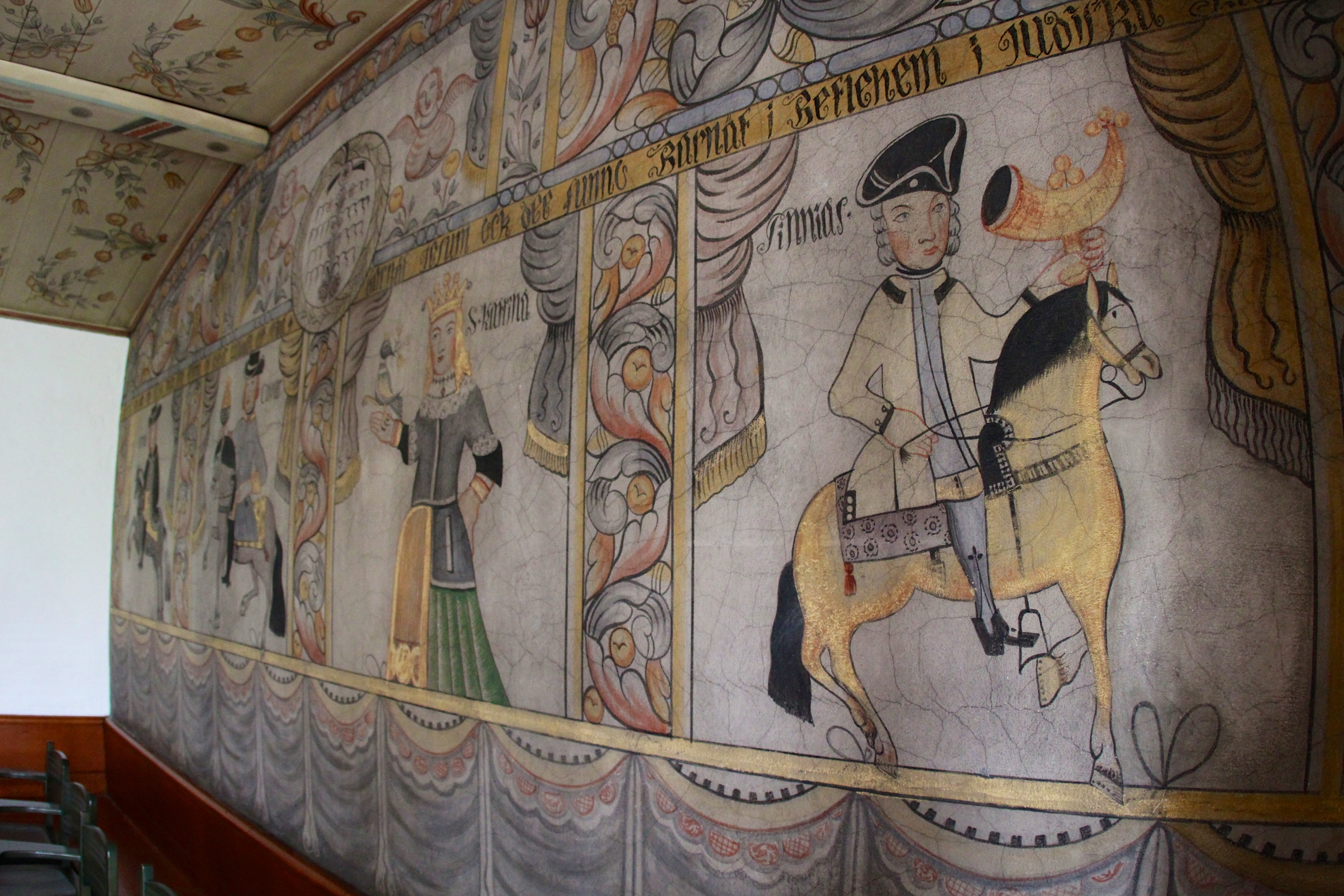
- Location: Room 135
- Dedicated: July 8, 1938
- Style: Folk Motif
- Architect: Linton R. Wilson
- Adviser: Carl Milles, Stockholm

The Swedish Classroom reflects a peasant cottage and contains murals painted by Olle Nordmark. The special glory of the room is the rear wall paintings. The inspiration for the four framed paintings came from painted panels done by the 18th-century painter from Hälsingland, Gustav Reuter. Linton Wilson found the panels at the Nordic Museum.

The hooded brick fireplace derives from an original in the Bollnäs Cottage in Skansen, the famous outdoor museum in Stockholm. The brilliant white walls and fireplace are constructed of 200-year-old handmade bricks. The fire tools were handwrought by Ola Nilsson, a Swedish blacksmith. He reconstructed tools used in his childhood home in Sweden.

A subtle sense of humor associated with the Swedish people is revealed in the room's paintings. A wall fresco secco depicts the Three Wise Men dressed as cavaliers riding to Bethlehem, in two directions. In their midst is Sweden's patron saint, St. Catherine. The sloped ceiling bears decorations in which the central figure is the Archangel Gabriel, seen as a droll trumpeter with two left feet. Nearby are renditions of Justice and Knowledge surrounded by groupings of flowers. Justice uses her blindfold to hold scales that appear balanced but have an off-center fulcrum. Knowledge seems puzzled as she contemplates writing on her slate with a quill pen.

Furniture and woodwork are the work of Erik Jansson of Philadelphia. The classroom's oak furniture is stained a muted gray-blue tone, similar to that found in old Swedish homes. Floral designs, in colors that complement the amber tone of fir wall benches, brighten the door and archive cabinet. The red brick floor is set in a herringbone pattern.

=== Swiss ===
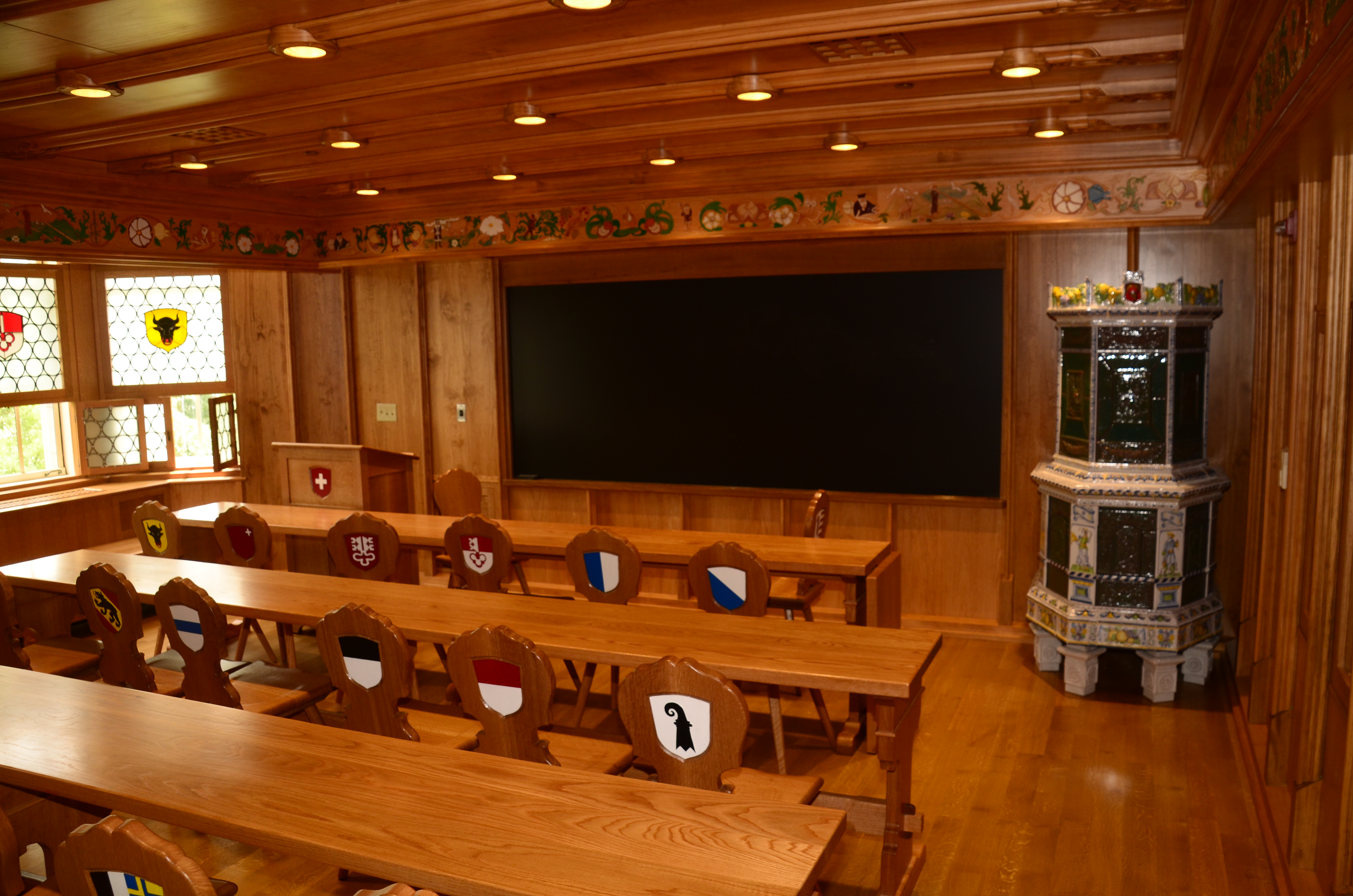
Swiss Nationality Room

Swiss Classroom
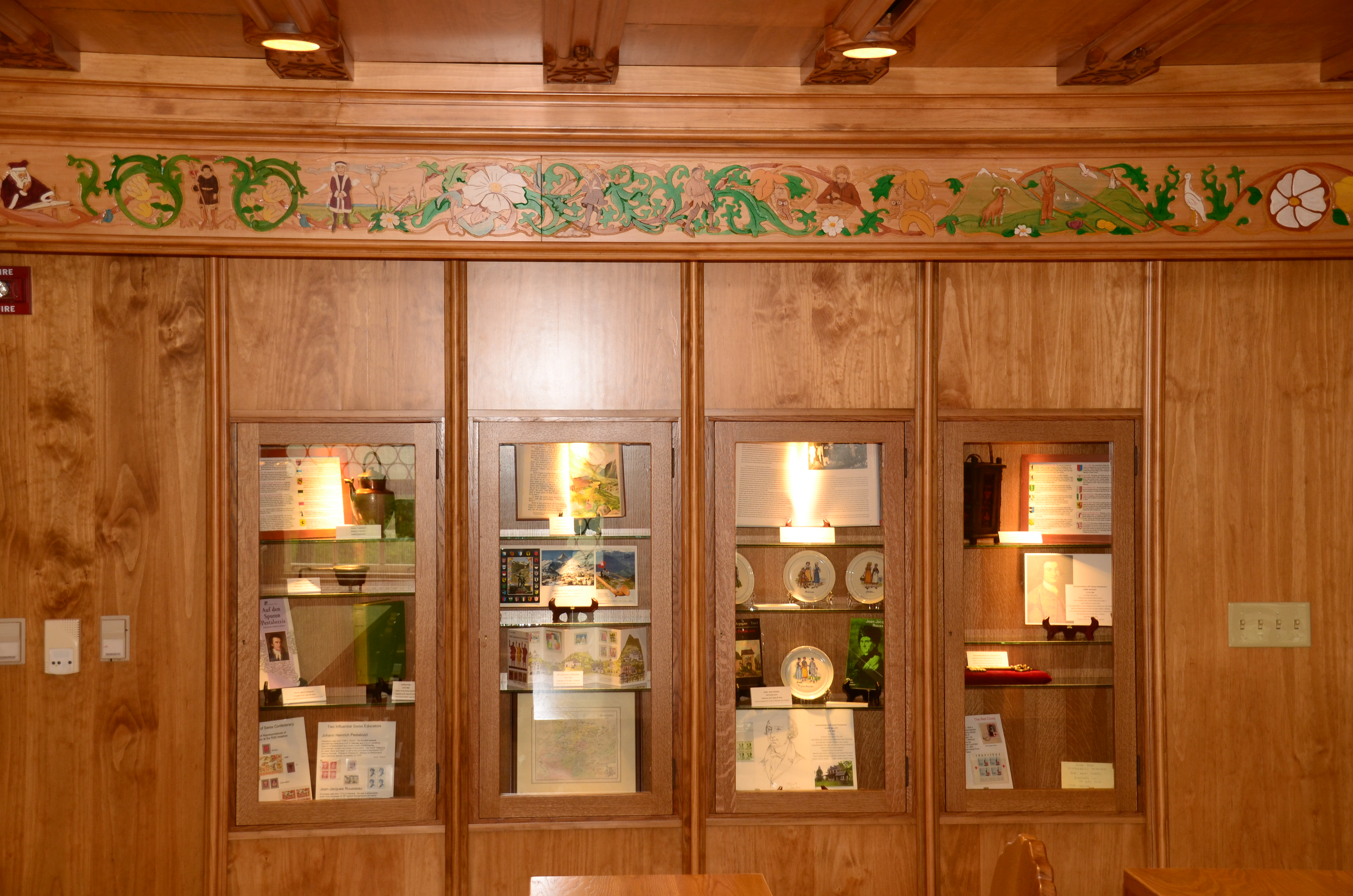
- Location: Room 321
- Dedicated: April 22, 2012
- Style: Late Medieval Style circa 1500
- Designer: Justin Rüssli, Lucerne
- Architect: Stephen Altherr

The Swiss Classroom is modeled after a 15th-century room from Fraumunster Abbey displayed in the Swiss National Museum in Zurich, Switzerland. The room is paneled in pine wood and features four white oak trestle tables and four display cases that represent the four languages of Switzerland: French, German, Italian, and Romansch. 26 country-style chairs contain painted carvings of the symbols of Switzerland's cantons that form the Swiss Confederation which united in 1291. The furniture and woodwork were crafted by Richard Sink of French Creek, WV.

A centerpiece of the room is a reproduction of a cocklestove that is modeled on a H.H. Graaf family oven on display in Schloss Wülflingen Castle, Winterthur. The cocklestove's ornate tiles contain several painted Swiss motifs that including various animals, plants, edelweiss, the heraldic emblem of the Graaf family, and a depiction of the Swiss legend of William Tell. Windows are leaded and feature three stained-glass shields of the original Swiss cantons as well as the Swiss Cross.

The Swiss Cross is also displayed stone over the door, within the window of the door, and on the lectern which is modeled on a 17th-century schoolmaster's desk. A carved and painted frieze depicts Swiss flora and fauna and an antique map depicts Switzerland by its ancient Latin name of "Helvetia". Portraits on the back wall, done in the style of Hans Holbein the Younger, depict Jean-Jacques Rousseau and Johann Heinrich Pestalozzi. Wood beamed ceiling contains LED lights that are hidden behind rosettes.

=== Syria-Lebanon ===
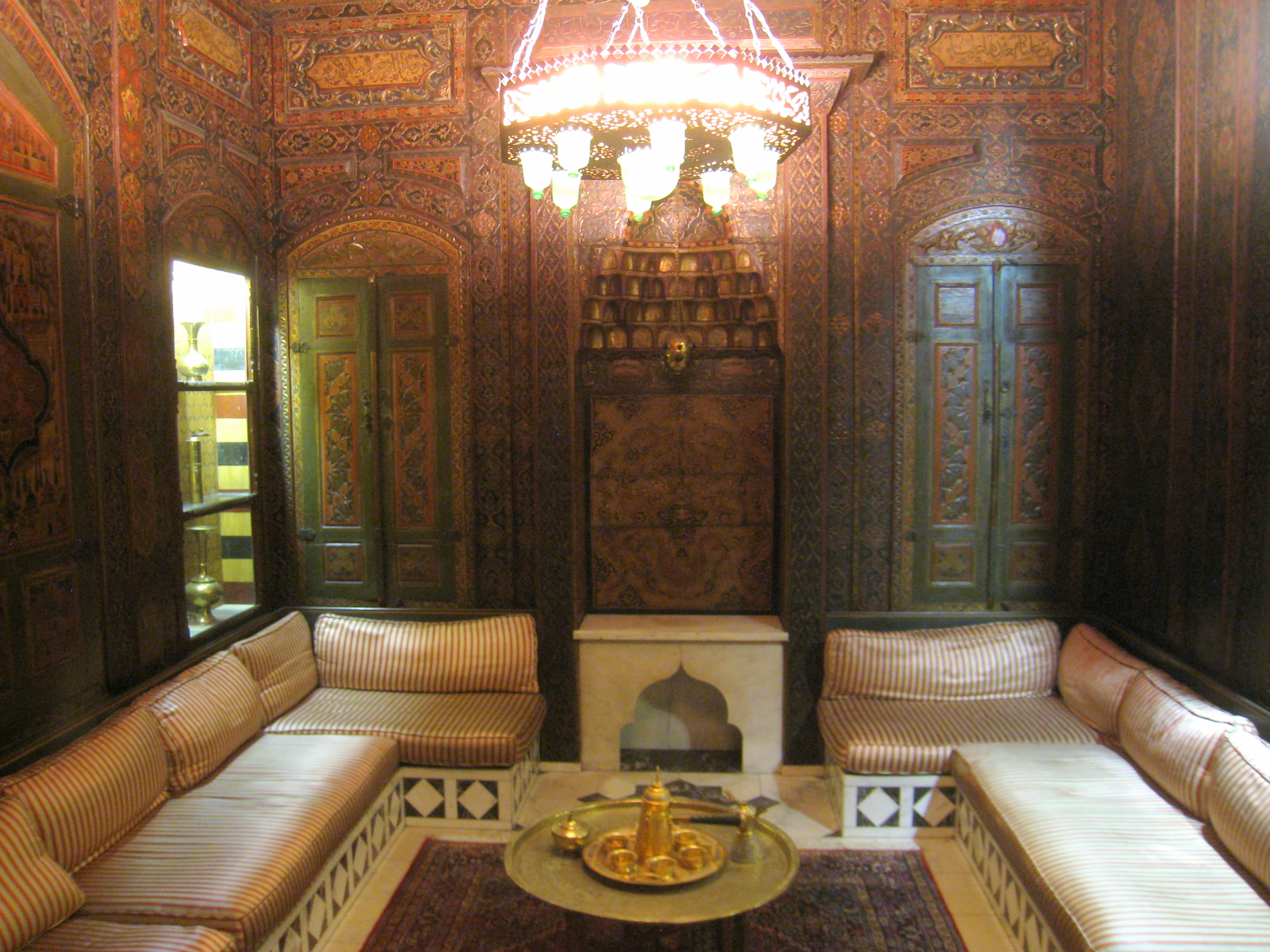
The Syria-Lebanon Room

Syria-Lebanon Room
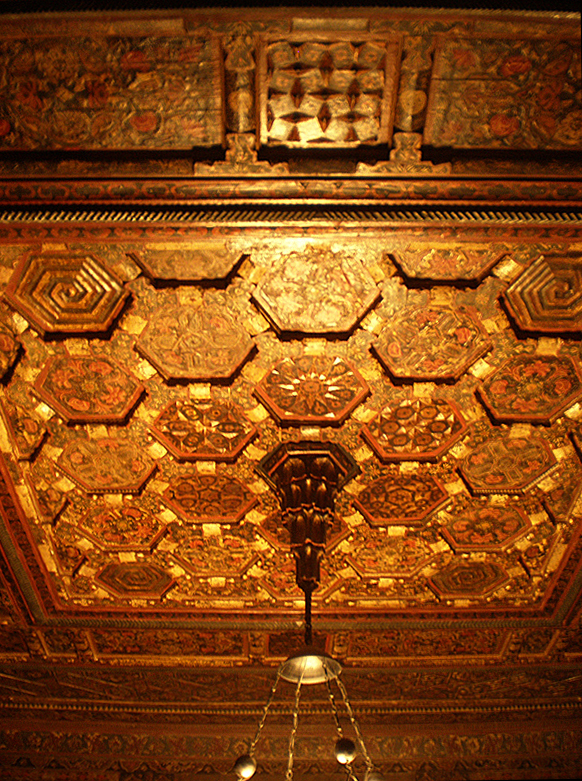
- Location: Room 160
- Dedicated: June 28, 1941
- Style: 18th century Damascus
- Architect: unrecorded

Originally a library built in 1782 in a wealthy Damascan merchant's home, the Syria-Lebanon Room was moved intact to its location in the Cathedral of Learning following a six-year effort to fund and install the room by the Syrian and Lebanese communities in Pittsburgh. Because of the fragility and pricelessness of the furnishing, it has been closed for class use and is one of two display rooms. The linden-paneled walls and ceilings are decorated with "gesso painting," a mixture of chalk and glue applied by brush in intricate relief, then painted and overlaid with silver and gold leaf. The room features a (now improperly oriented) mihrab with a stalactite vault traditionally housing the Koran and prayer rug. Set in the walls are book cabinets and display shelves. The room is illuminated by an old mosque lamp of perforated copper with handblown glass wells that originally held oil, water, and wicks. The sofas, from the Arabic word "suffah", are covered in satin and rest on a dark red and white marble foundation. The marble floor slopes down at the entrance where visitors would remove their shoes before entering. In 1997, a glass-paneled French-style door to the room was added to allow the room to be visible from passers-by. The doors were patterned after a grille design found on the windows of the 18th century Ibn Room in the Islamic section of the Metropolitan Museum in New York City.

=== Turkish ===
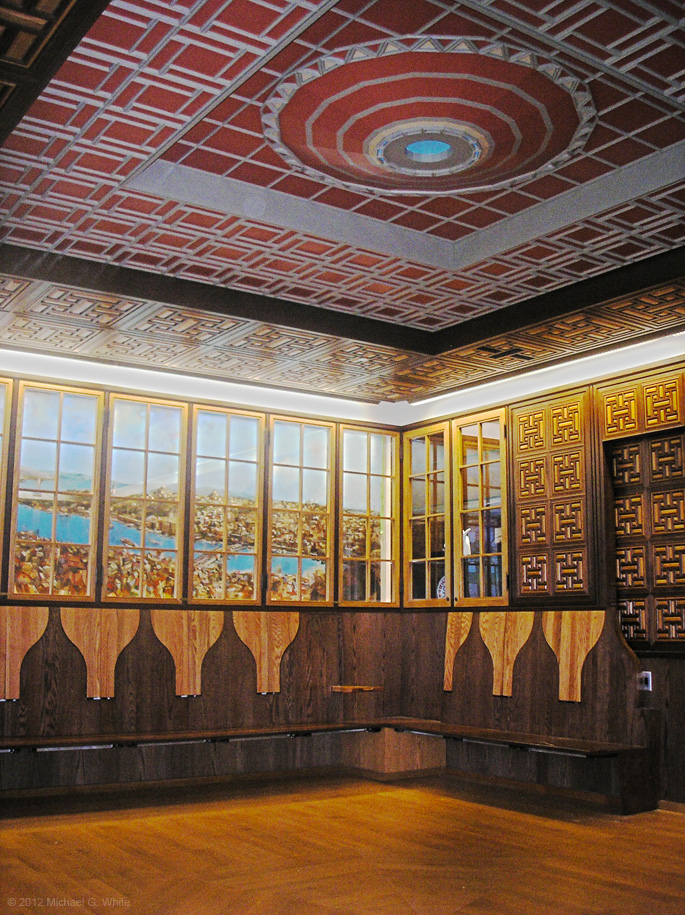
The Turkish Classroom

Turkish Classroom
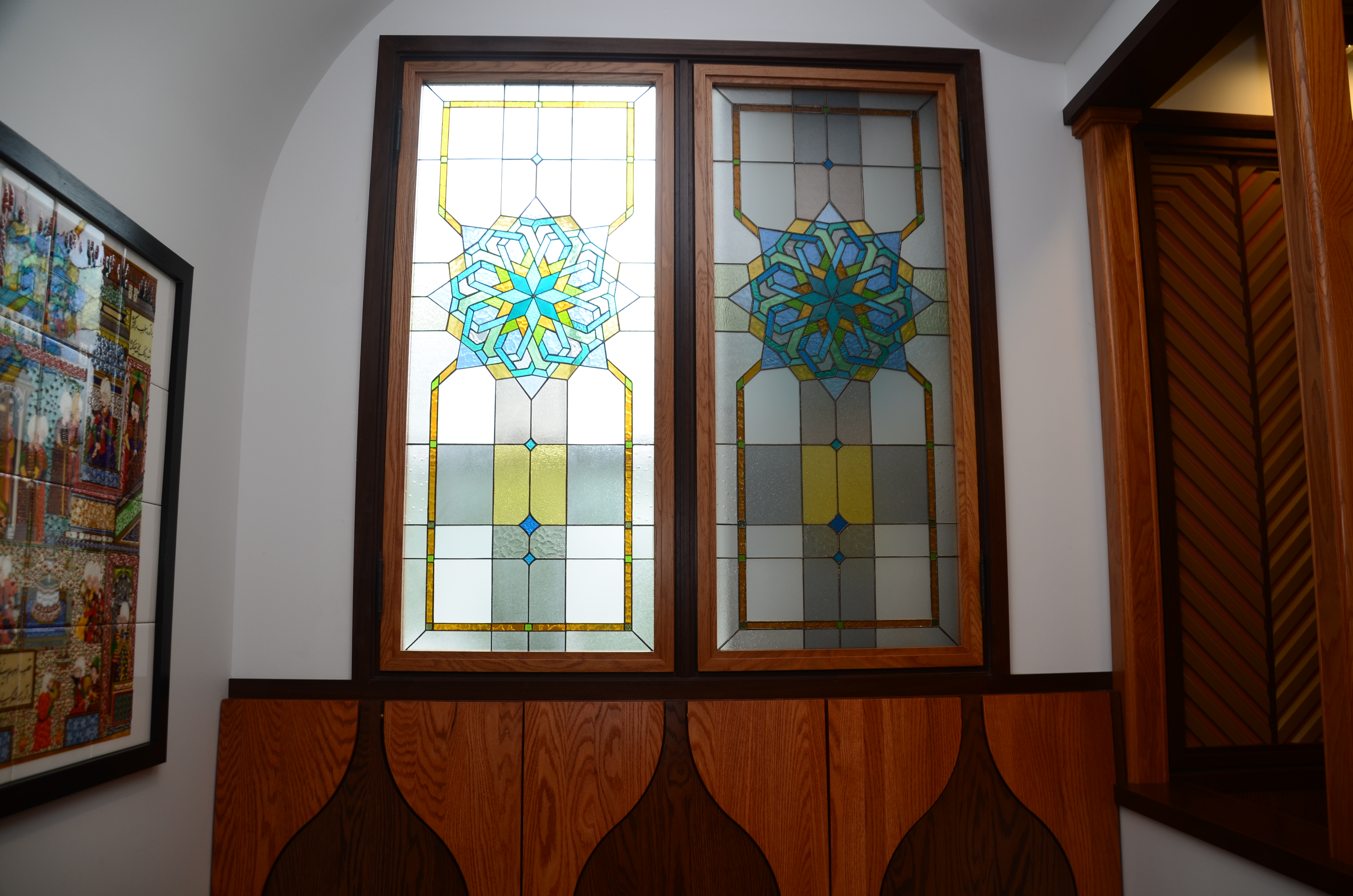
- Location: Room 339
- Dedicated: March 4, 2012
- Style: Baş Odası circa 1400AD
- Designer: Omer Akin
- Architect: Omer Akin and John Cleary

The Turkish Nationality Room was based on a baş odası, or main room, of a typical Turkish house or hayat with an outer gallery and a side iwan. The iwan is intended to be used as an entrance area similar to the royal pavilion, annexed to the Yeni Mosque in the Eminönü district of Istanbul, which was built in 1663 for the use of Sultan Mehmet IV. In the iwan of the Turkish Nationality Room, four ceramic panels, painted on clay tiles in Ankara, represent various cultures and points in Turkish history. The largest ceramic is a portrait of Mustafa Kemal Atatürk, the founder and first president of the Republic of Turkey, who is depicted instructing the nation on the Turkish alphabet adopted in 1928. Other panels depict Uighur princesses, who represent the importance of women in circa 9th-century Turkish culture, a reproduction of "Two merchants in conversation" by Mehmed Siyah Kalem which signifies the appearance of realism in Turkish drawing around the 14th century; and a depiction of Suleiman the Magnificent at the circumcision ceremony of Şehzade Beyazıt and Şehzade Cihangir which represents the apex of Ottoman power and culture in the 16th century. The main room attempts to convey the theme of democracy with its seating distributed around the perimeter of the room which suggests that all occupants are equals. Hardwood seats mimic divan-style seating found in a typical baş odası with back panels that function as writing tablets which when retracted form a "parted curtain" motif, a common shape used for household wall niches. The room's ceiling, modeled after the Emirhocazade Ahmet Bey summer house in Safranbolu, is a combination of traditional çitakâri and kündekâri carpentry art that creates intricate geometric patterns using small pieces of wood attached without metal fasteners or glue. Clear glass windows along one wall frame a painted mural depicting a panoramic view of Istanbul which is feature similar to that seen in the mirrored room of the Topkapi Palace. The stained glass windows depict a tulip shape which served as a symbol of the Ottomans in the 18th century. Display cases contain historic examples of Turkish calligraphy, ceramics, jewelry, miniatures and textiles as well as an evil eye. The entrance symbol above the exterior door depicts the current flag of Turkey, adopted in 1936.

=== Ukrainian ===
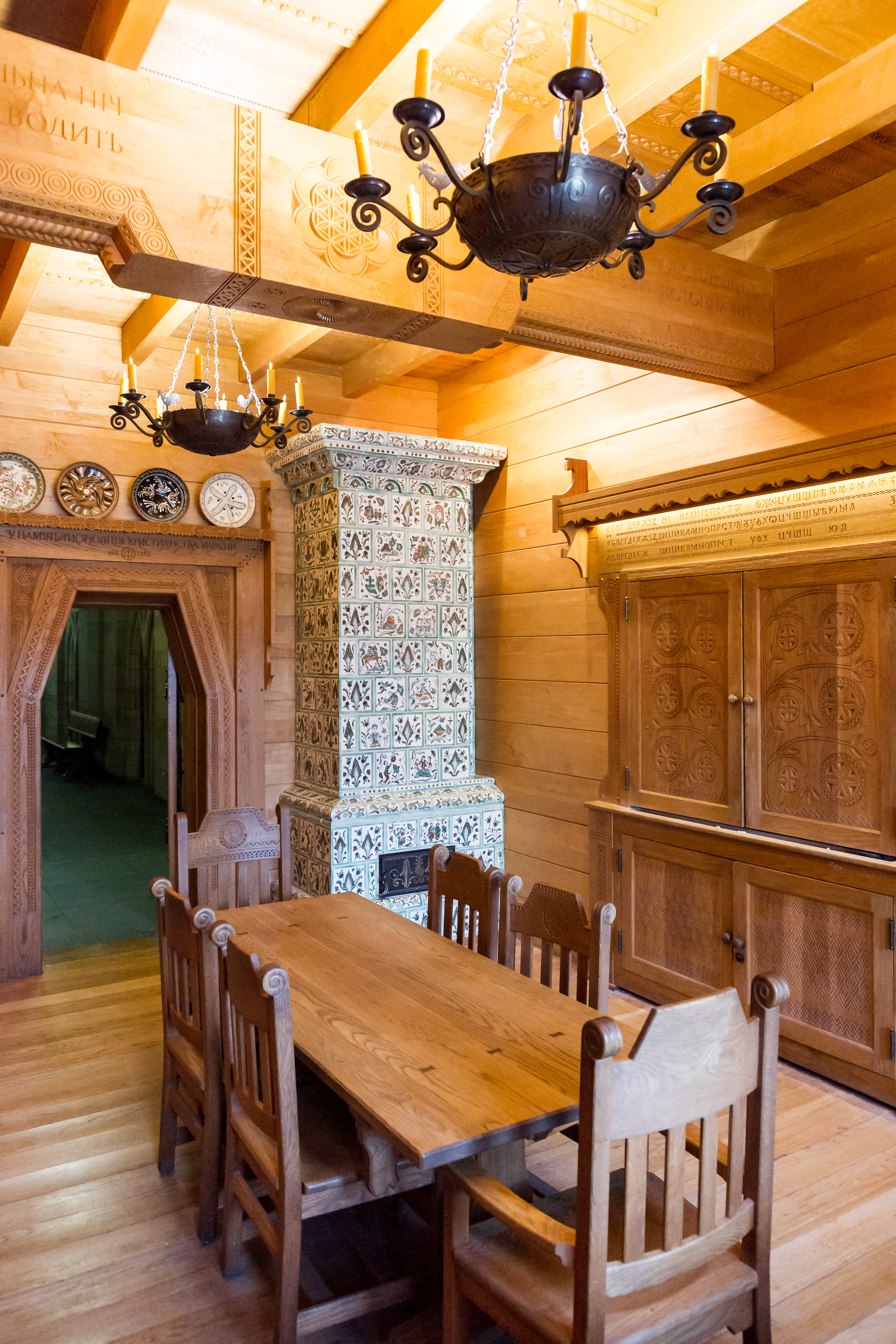
The Ukrainian Classroom

Ukrainian Classroom
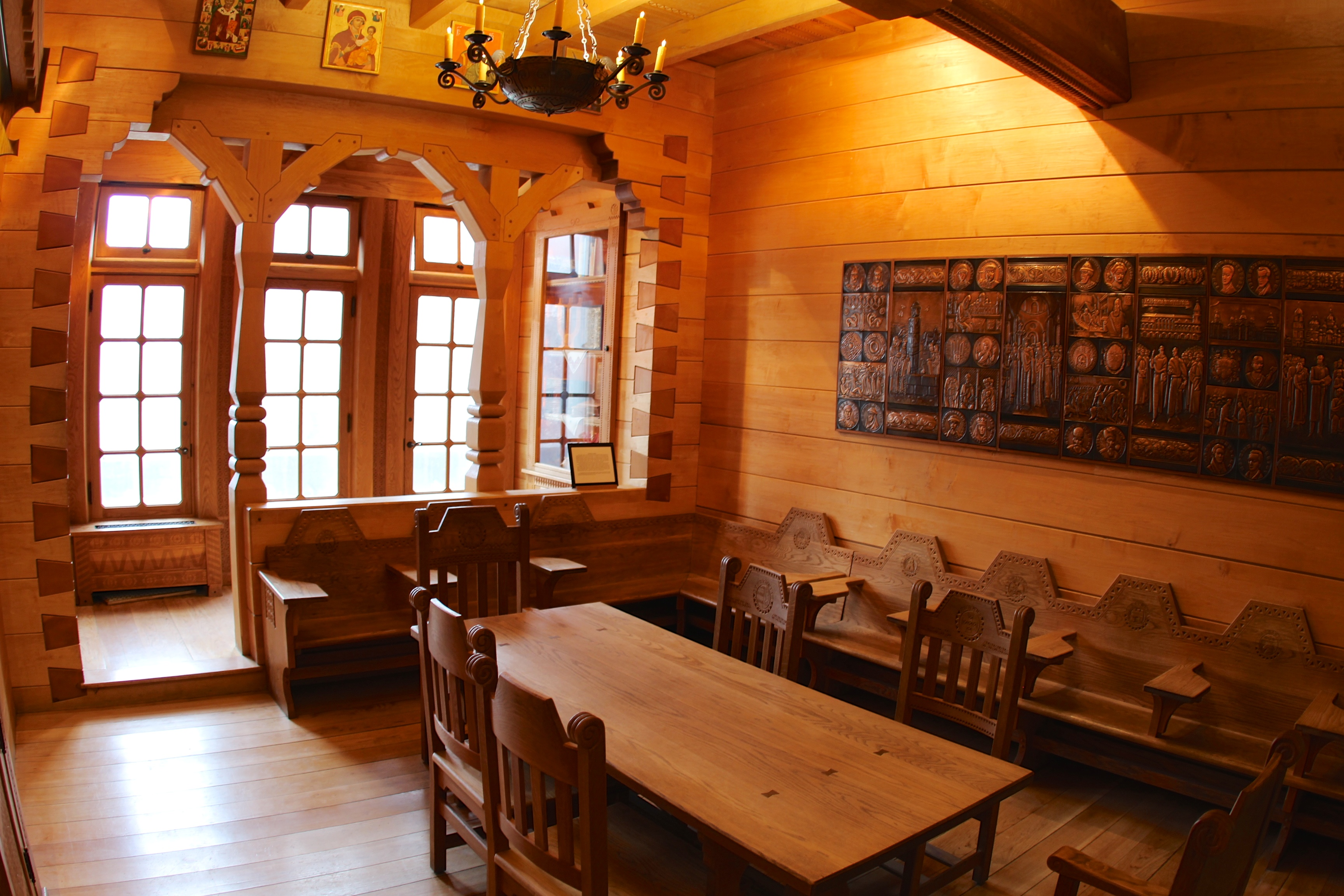
- Location: Room 341
- Dedicated: June 17, 1990
- Style: 17th–18th century Ukrainian Baroque
- Designer: Lubomyr E. Kalynych
- Architect: Walter R. Boykowycz, A.I.A.

The Ukrainian Classroom is designed in Baroque style with richly carved wood, colorful ceramics, and intricate metalwork in this adaptation of a nobleman's reception room. The entrance has an archaic trapezoidal form with carved motifs of water (chevron), wheat, and sunflowers. The lintel inscription commemorates Ukraine's millennium of Christianity (988–1988). The stove tiles depict festival practices and daily life. A pokutia, or place of honor, is defined by the benches and the traditional icons of St. Nicholas, the Mother of God, Christ the Teacher, and St. George.

The chalkboard doors bearing the Tree of Life are surmounted by three Cyrillic alphabets used in Ukraine in the 11th, 17th, and 19th centuries. On the right wall, a copper bas-relief depicts the development of Ukrainian culture over the millennia. It portrays cultural centers, historical figures, rituals, monuments, and the evolution of Ukrainian ornament. The massive crossbeam's elaborate carvings include a protective solar symbol and a quotation from Ukraine's bard Taras Shevchenko (1814–1861): "Learn, my brothers! Think and read ... Learn foreign thoughts, but do not shun your own country!" Beyond the wood posts, reminiscent of a gallery, the display case houses traditional Ukrainian art and crafts.

=== Welsh ===
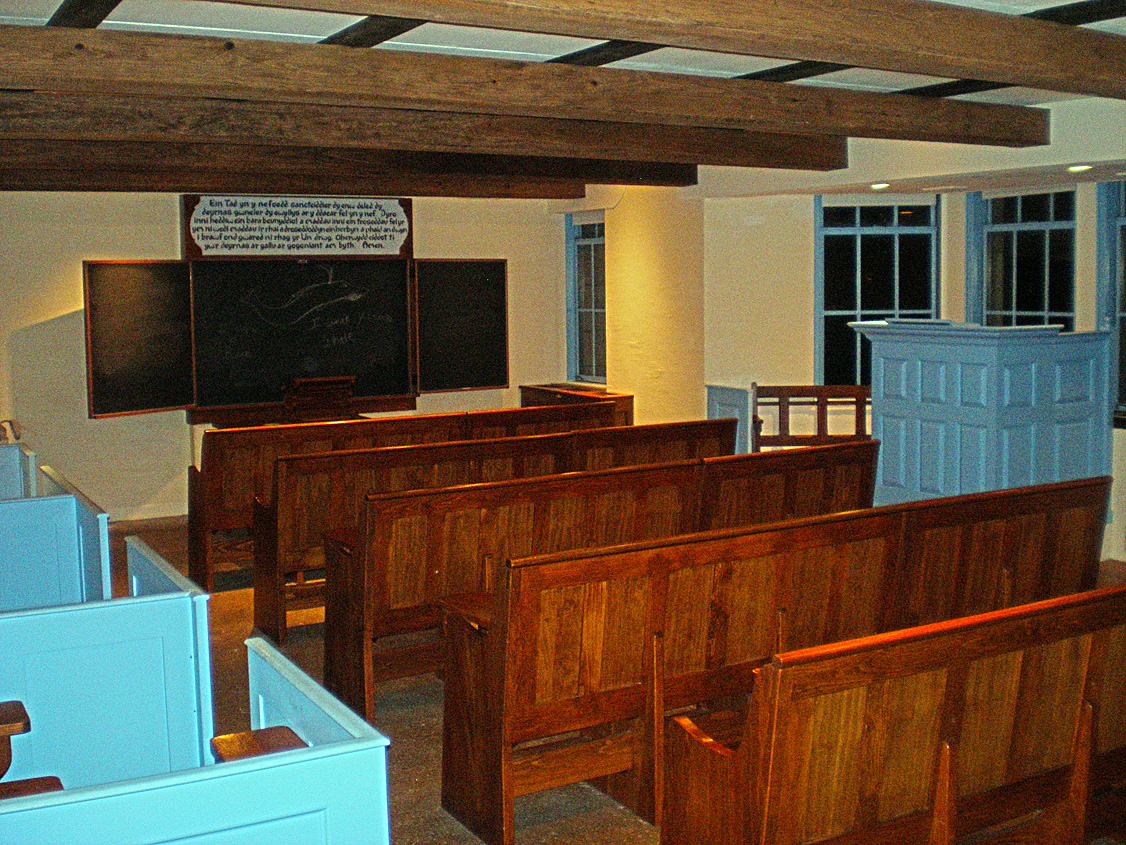
The Welsh Classroom

Welsh Classroom
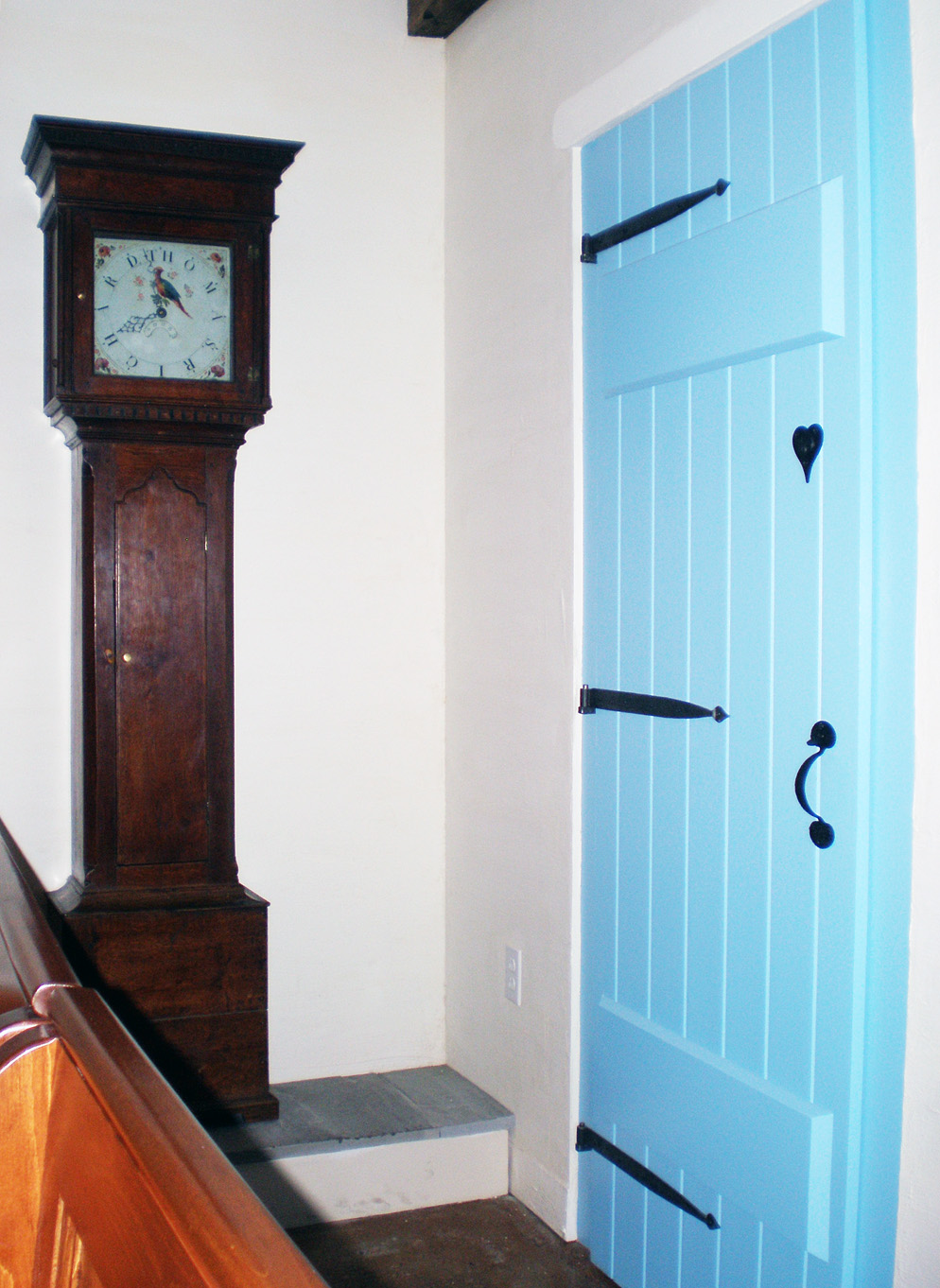
- Location: Room 342
- Dedicated: June 1, 2008
- Style: 18th century Non-Conformist chapel
- Architect: Martin Powell, Katherine Horstman, Richard Freeman, Yaso Snyder

The Welsh Classroom, was perhaps the longest in coming, as reservations for a Welsh room were originally requested in the 1930s. The existing room, installed on the third floor of the Cathedral of Learning, is patterned after the Pen-rhiw Chapel at St Fagans National History Museum near Cardiff and represents a traditional 18th-century Welsh chapel, which often became the center of village social life. By that time, the English ruled the country and imposed law requiring English as the official language of the courts and churches. In order to worship and hold church services in their native Welsh language, and spurred on by the non-conformist movement started by the Protestant Reformation, the Welsh people met in secret locations such as barns or homes, as suggested by the simple white walled chapel modeled in this Nationality Room. The minister would live at one end as depicted by the display case with dishes and pottery that would be found in a Welsh kitchen and the long oak case clock seated on a Welsh slate foundation opposite the main blue door. The clock, considered one of the most important furnishings in a Welsh home, has, instead of numbers, a painted square face that spells out "Richard Thomas" suggesting that he was both the maker and owner of the clock. The bay window serves as the focus of the Welsh chapel worship, including a blue raised pulpit with a view of the entire congregation and two Deacon's benches from which to monitor the actions of the minister and congregation.

At the other end of the room is a table bearing a lectern, as such worship places would often become a school room for both children and adults during week days. Above the chalk board is the Lord's Prayer, written in Welsh. Pew benches of pine face the lectern. Along the wall, larger and more comfortable blue-painted pew boxes with wooden floors, often also serving as barn cattle stalls, would have served wealthier families who would sometimes bring straw, blankets, hot bricks, or dogs to keep them warm. To reflect the simplicity of such meeting places, the ceiling beams are made of poplar and flooring suggests a typical chapel dirt floor. The carved stone dragon over the doorway, the long-time Welsh national symbol, represents the legendary victory of the Red Dragon over the White Dragon of numerous tales of medieval Welsh literature and represents the triumph of Good over Evil.

=== Yugoslav ===
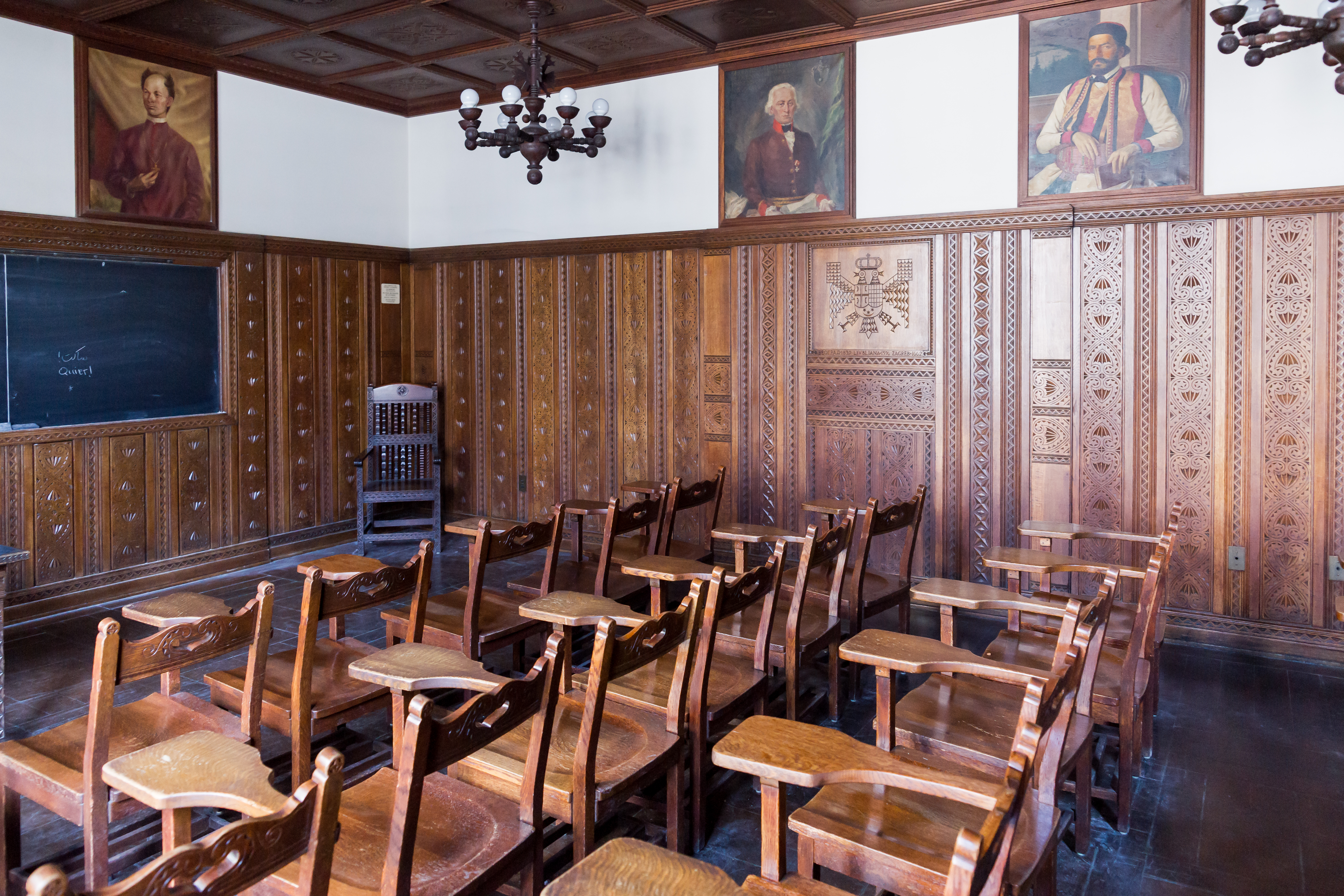
The Yugoslav Classroom

Yugoslav Classroom
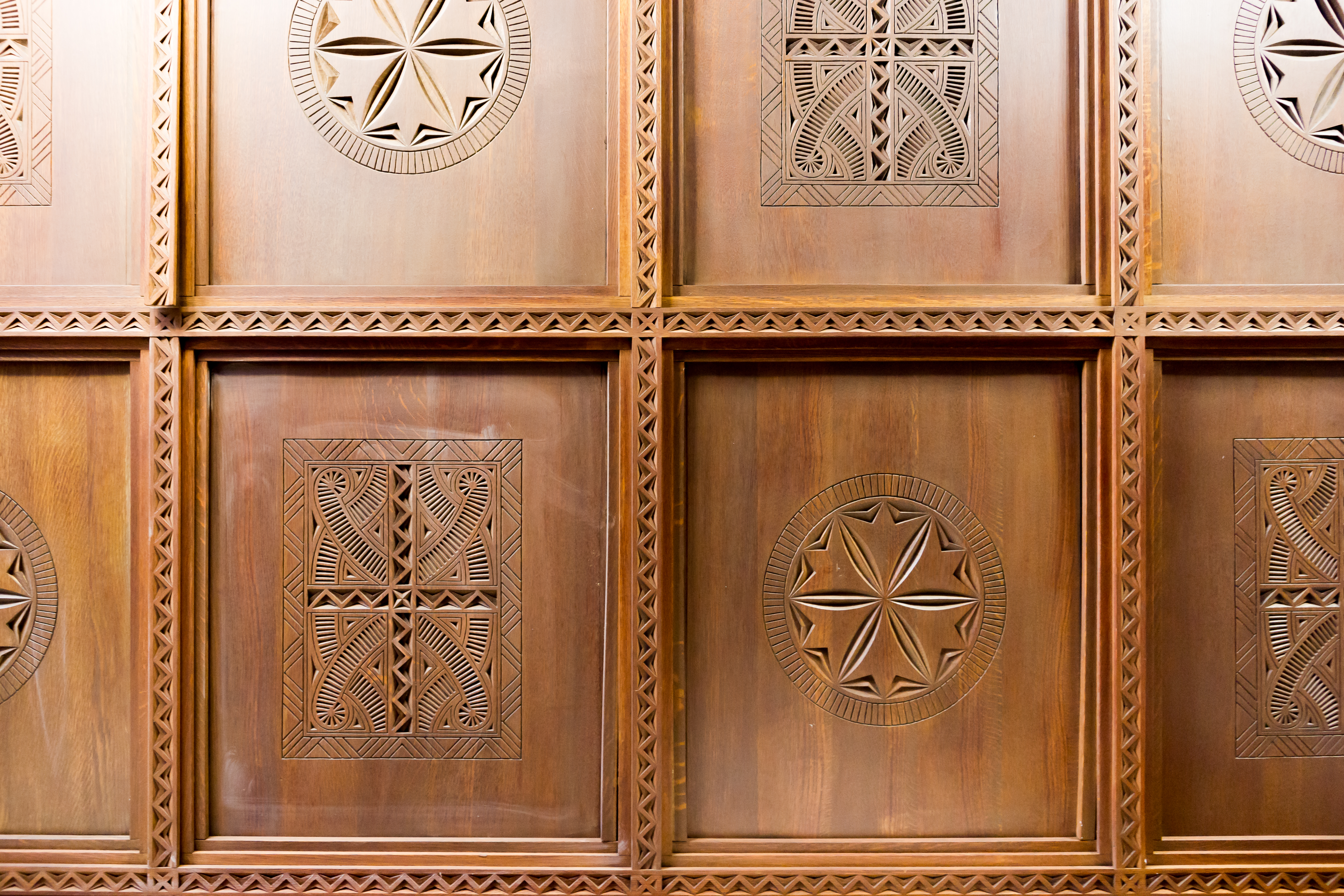
- Location: Room 142
- Dedicated: March 31, 1939
- Style: Folk Motif
- Architect: Vojta Braniš, Zagreb

The Yugoslav Classroom was designed by Professor Vojta Braniš, a sculptor and director of the Industrial Art School in Zagreb. The walls are paneled in Slavonian oak and hand-carved with geometric figures and the old Slavonic heart design which is combined with a running geometric border, a favorite with South Slavs. This type of work, known as "notch-carving", was traditionally done with a penknife as pastime of peasants. On the corridor wall is a specially designed coat of arms featuring a double-headed eagle symbolizing the religious influences of Eastern Empire of Byzantium and Western Empire of Rome along with the founding dates of the universities in Belgrade, Ljubljana, and Zagreb. The ceiling is carved with intricate Croatian, Slovenian, and Serbian folk motifs and the wooden chandeliers are similar to those in the White Palace in Belgrade. The professor's chair and guests chairs were carved by students at the International Art School in Zagreb, and each spindle of the chairs bears a different notched design. At the window, a bronze sculpture by Vojta Braniš, "Post-War Motherhood", depicts a barefoot mother nursing her child whom she has protected during the long months of war. In the display cabinet is a lace portrayal of the Madonna of Brežje by Slovenes Leopoldina Pelhan and her student Mila Božičkova which took six months to complete and was inspired by the story of a lace Madonna created by the villagers of Sveta Gora in order to replace a priceless painting during World War I. The ceiling squares contain one of the three alternating ceiling ornaments suggesting flowers, stars, the sun, and other radiating geometric patterns, which are organized into a matrix of 9 by 7 squares.

Above the paneled walls, six portraits depict prominent Yugoslavs. On the front wall are portraits of Vuk Stefanović Karadžić (1787–1864) who compiled the Serbian dictionary and collected, edited, and published Serbian national ballads and folk songs; and Croatian statesman Bishop Josip Juraj Strossmayer (1815–1905) who was known for his efforts to achieve understanding between the Roman Catholic and Greek Orthodox churches, founder of the Yugoslav Academy of Sciences and Arts (now the Croatian Academy of Sciences and Arts). On the corridor wall are likenesses of Baron George von Vega (1754–1802), a Slovenian officer in the Austrian army and mathematician recognized for various works including a book of logarithm tables; and Petar Petrović Njegoš (1813–1851), the last prince-bishop of Montenegro, who was celebrated for his poetry. Represented on the rear wall are Rugjer Bošković (1711–1787), a Ragusan scientist distinguished for his achievements in the fields of mathematics, optics, and astronomy; and France Prešeren (1800–1849) who is considered the greatest Slovenian classical poet.

The Yugoslav Classroom's executive committee was first organized in 1926 under the chairmanship of Anton Gazdić, the president of the Croatian Fraternal Union. After his death in September 1933 the new chairman was Steve Babić, the previous vice-chairman, and the new vice-chairwoman became Catherine Rušković McAleer. Famous Croatian sculptor Ivan Meštrović was a great supporter of the Classroom and gave two of his works to the university, one a bust of Mihajlo Pupin and the other a self-portrait. The Classroom was designed to portray the culture and traditions of the Yugoslavs, who were considered as inhabitants of the various Yugoslavian regions: Croatians, Dalmatians, Slavonians, Slovenians, Serbians, Bosnians and Montenegrins.

=== Proposed rooms ===
The university has two additional Nationality Room Committees which are in various stages of fund raising and room design.

Proposed rooms include the following:

- Finnish, currently under construction with a completion date expected in 2027.
- Iranian
- Thai

Prior projects for Danish, Latin American, Moroccan, and Caribbean rooms have been discontinued.

== Gallery ==
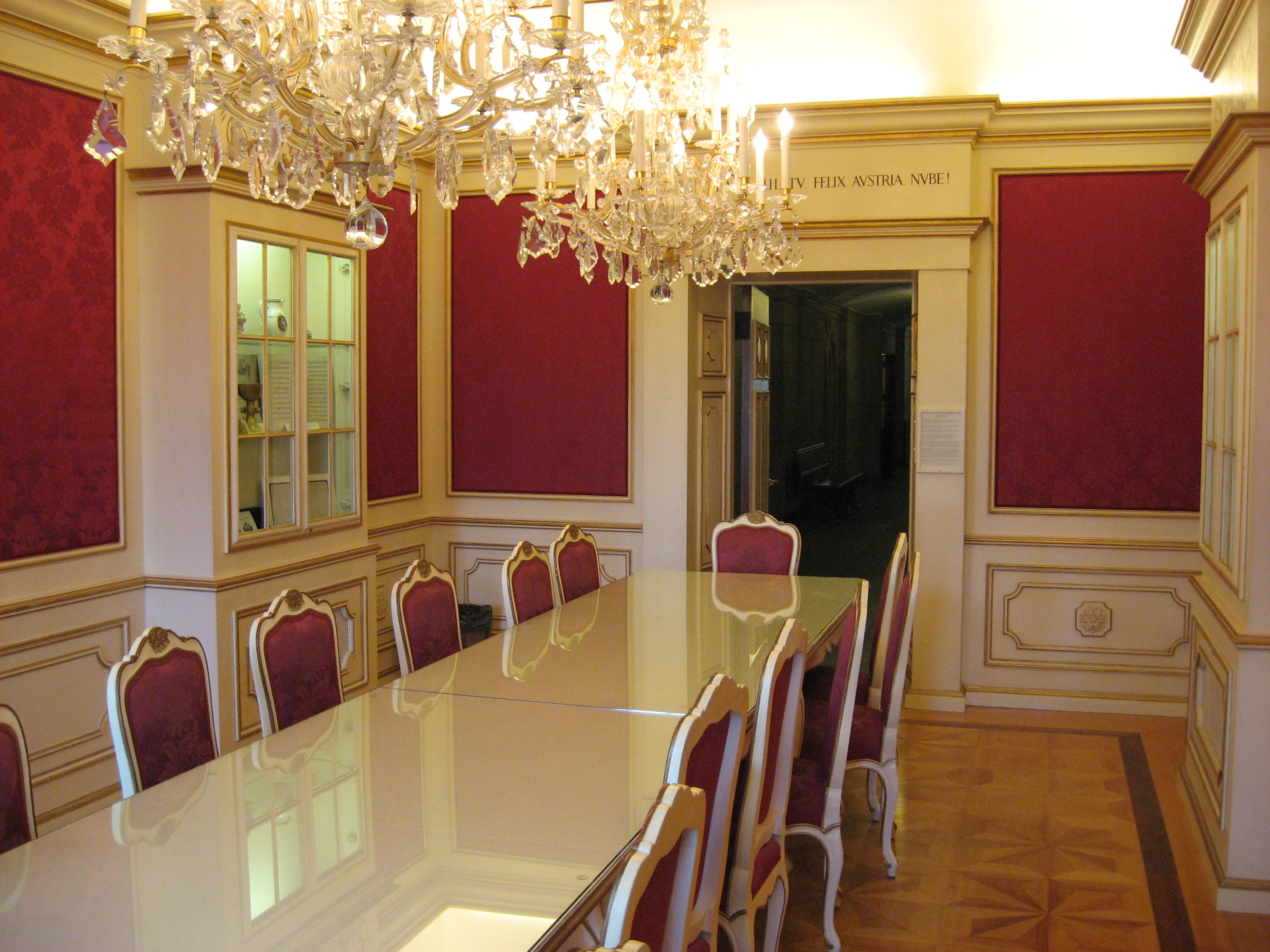
Austrian Room

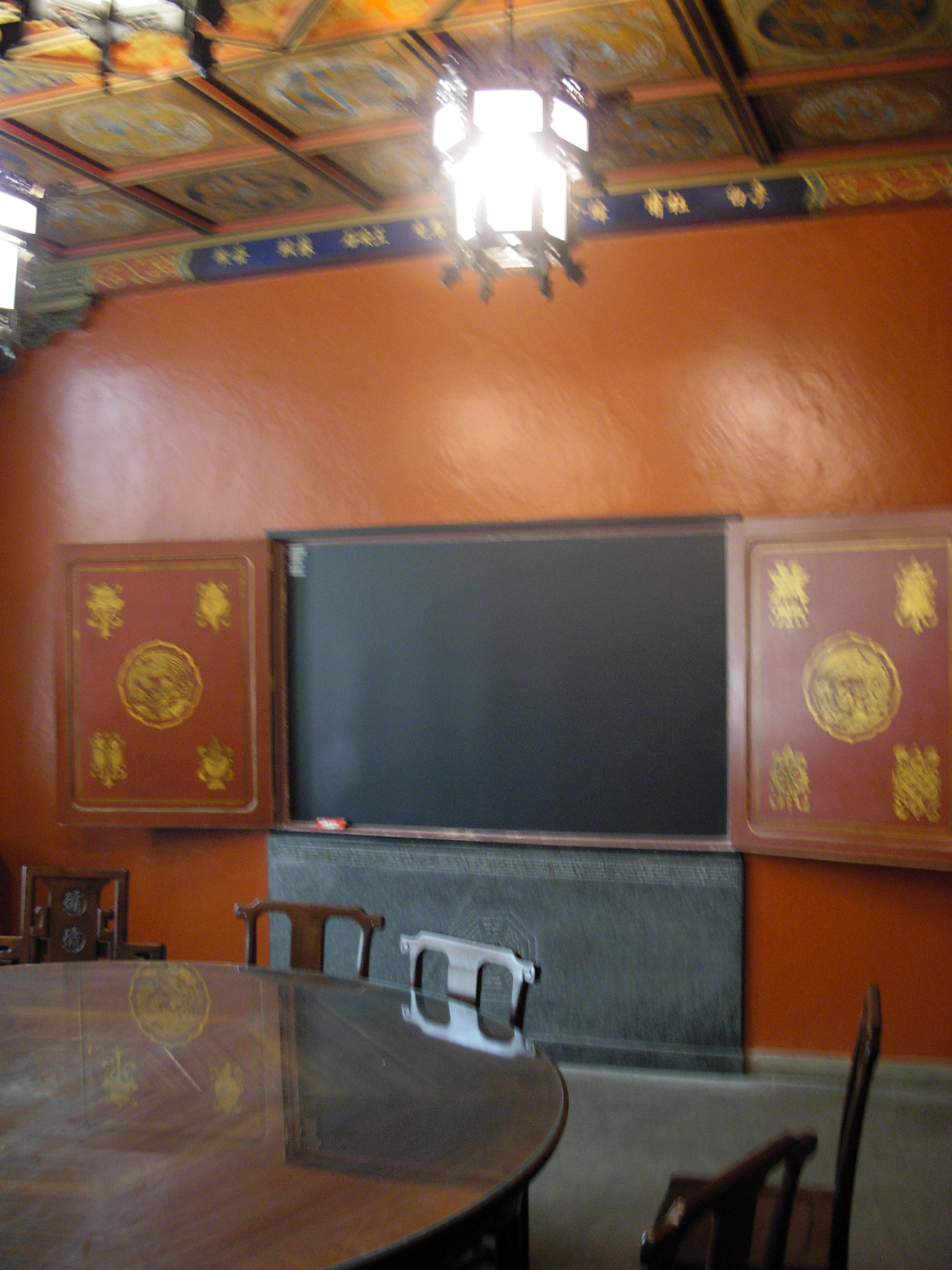
Chinese Room

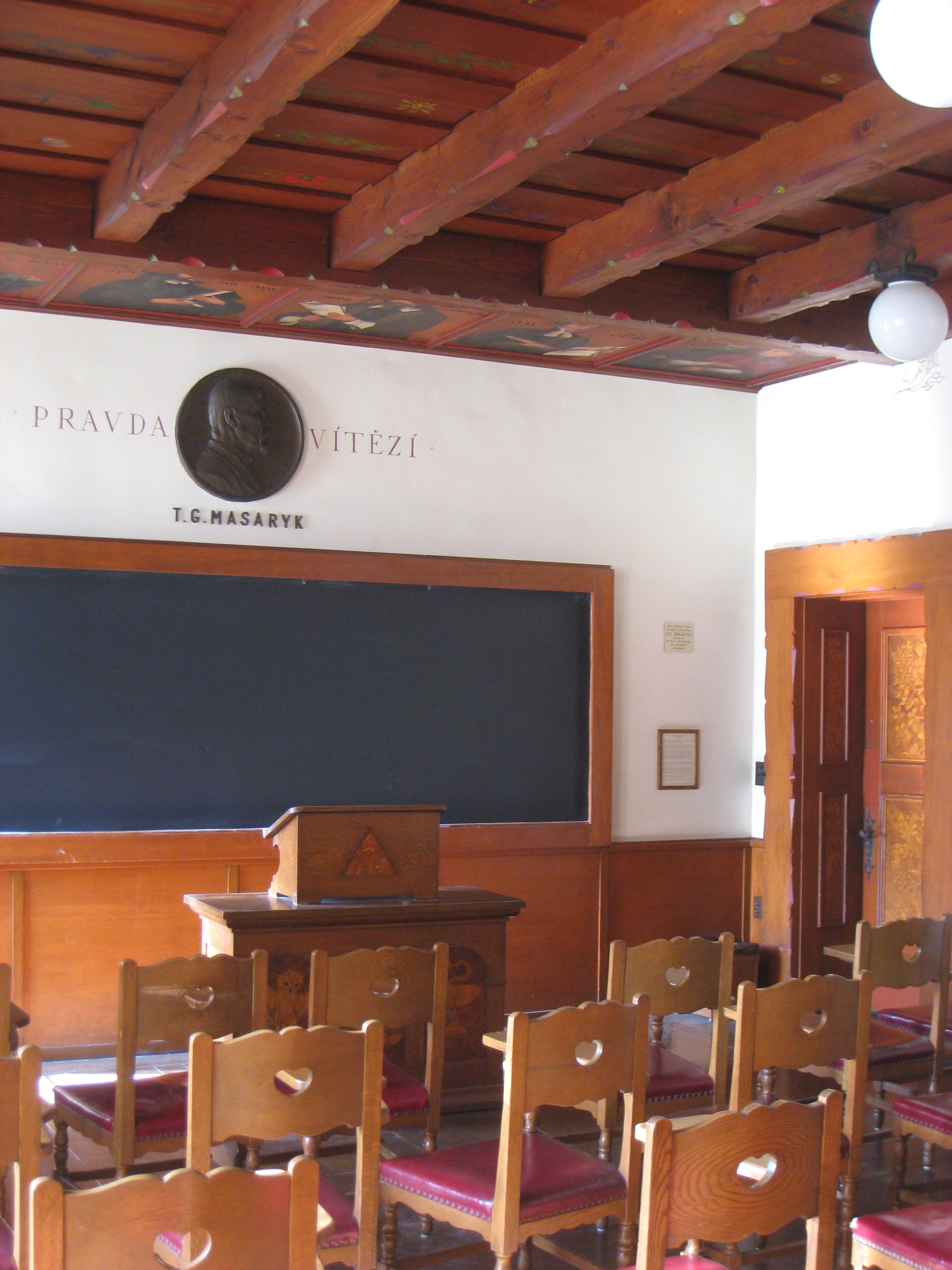
Czechoslovak Room

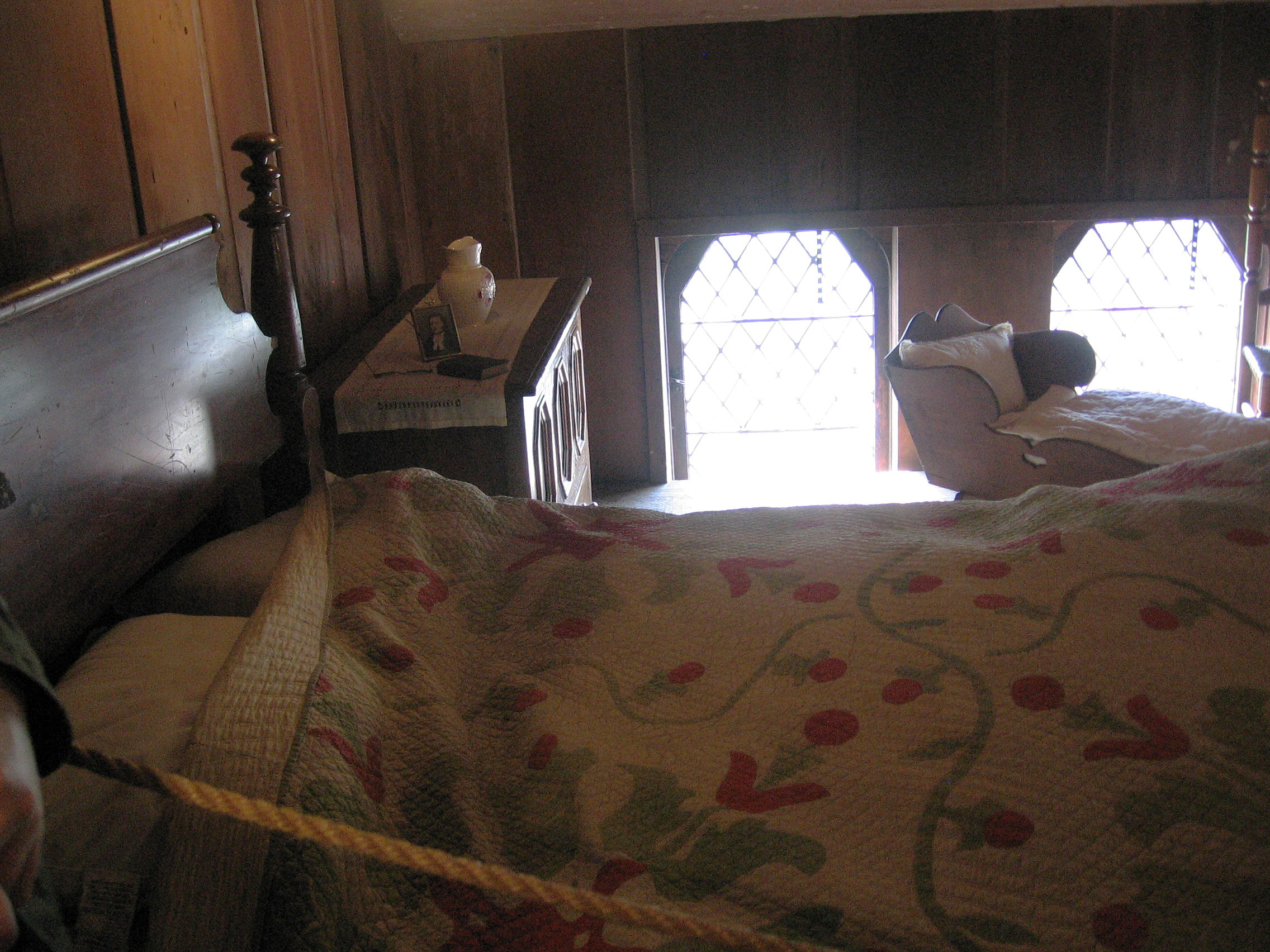
Hidden upstairs bedroom of the Early American Room

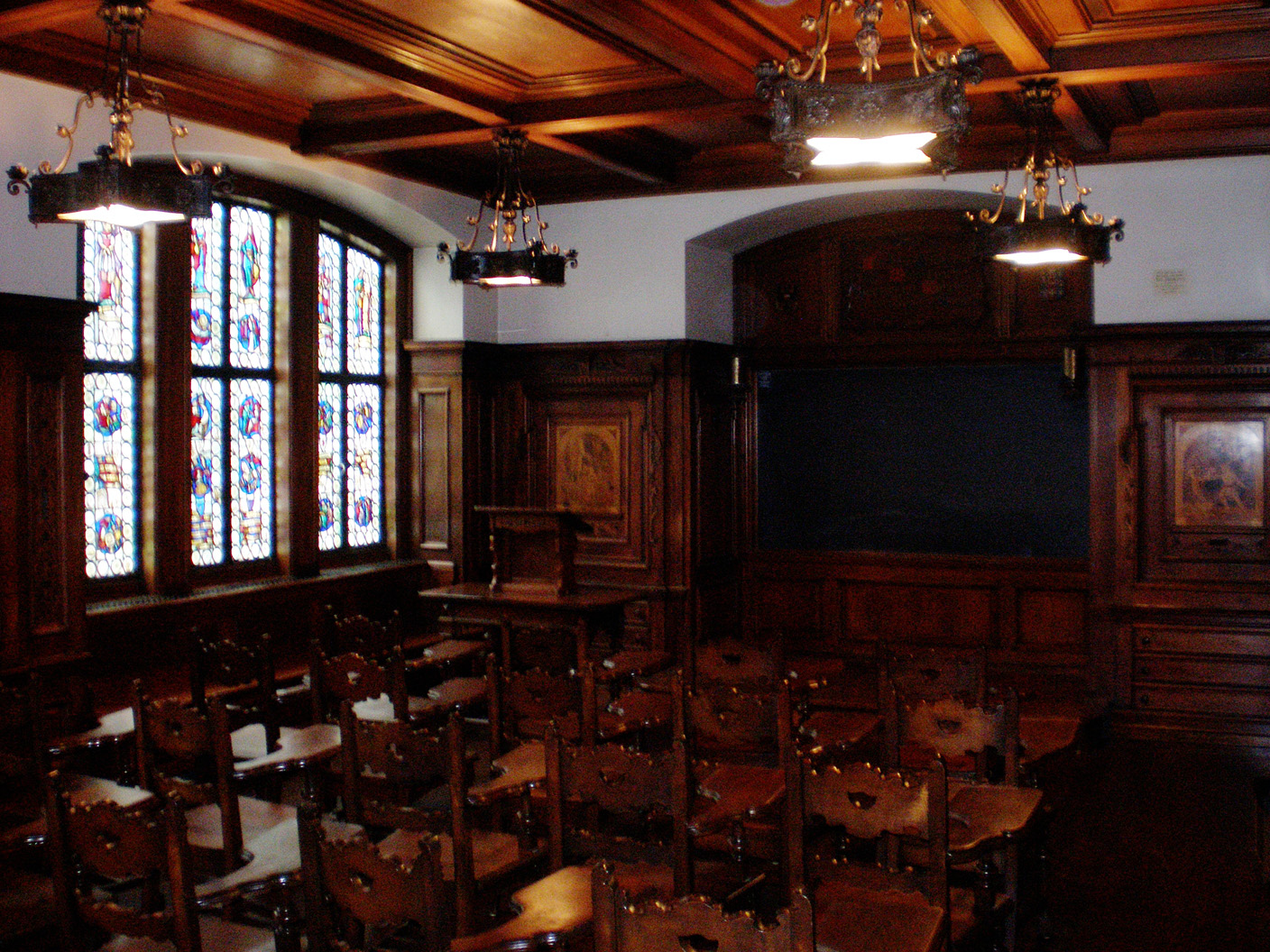
German Room

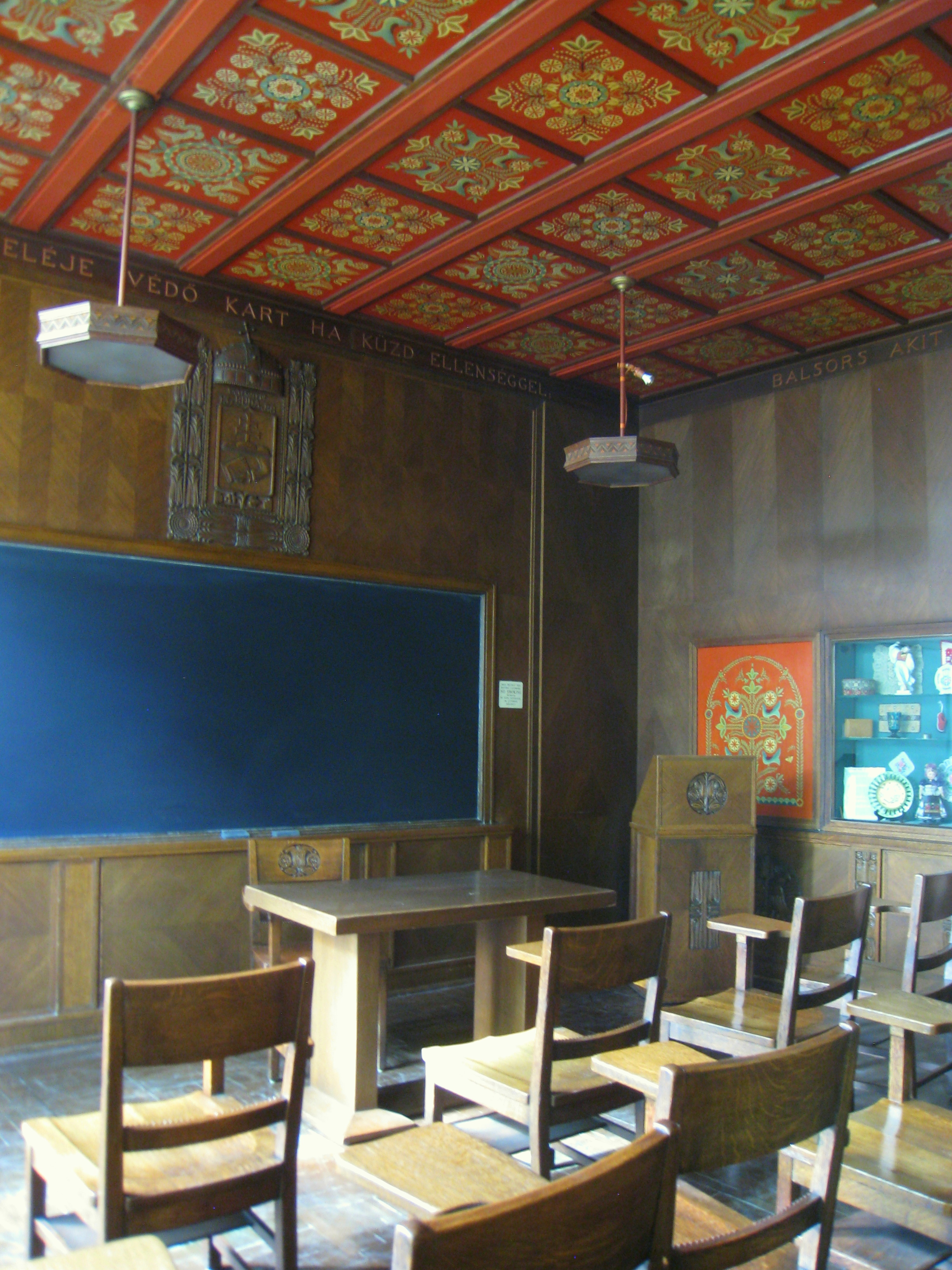
Hungarian Room

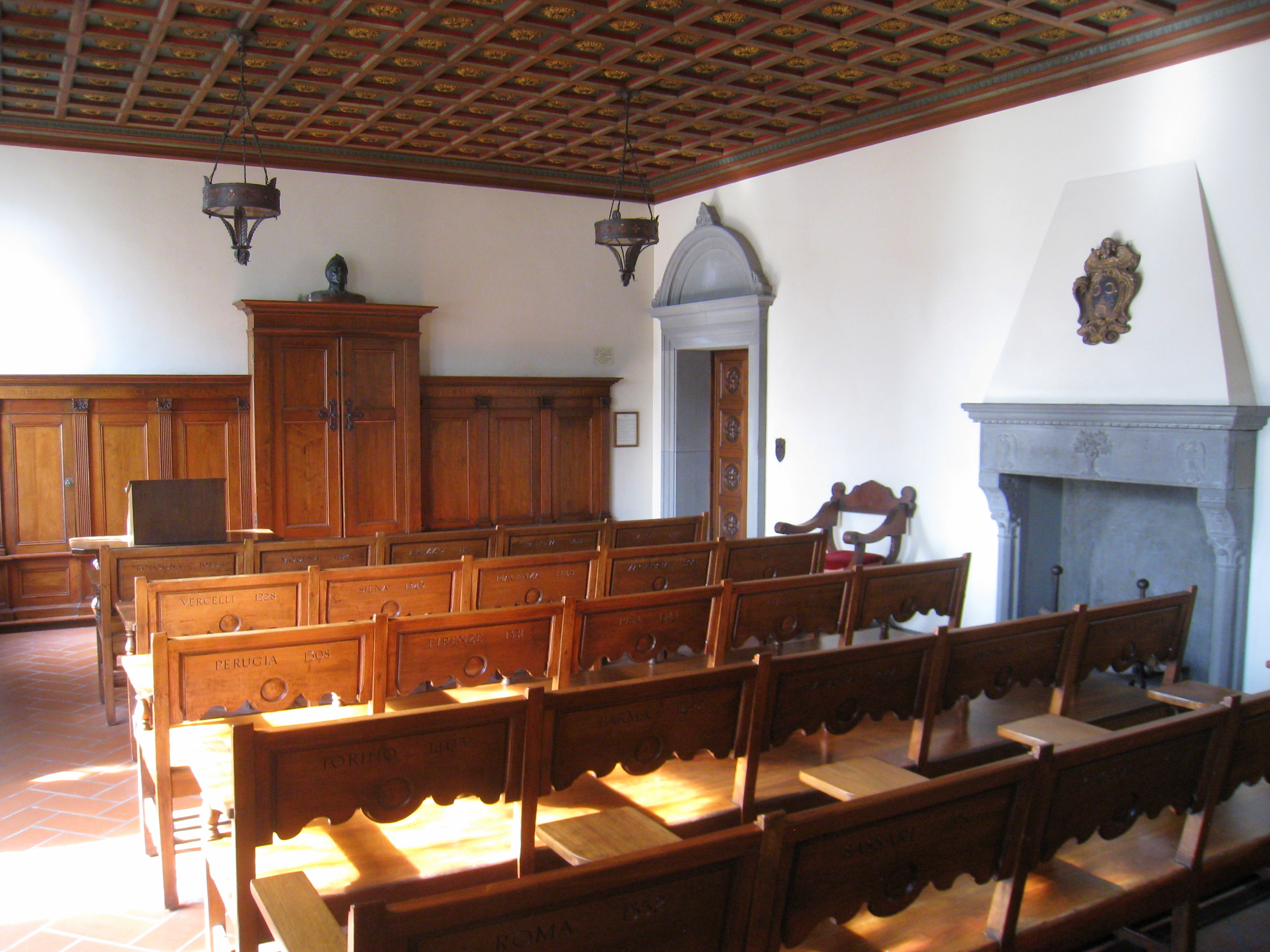
Italian Room

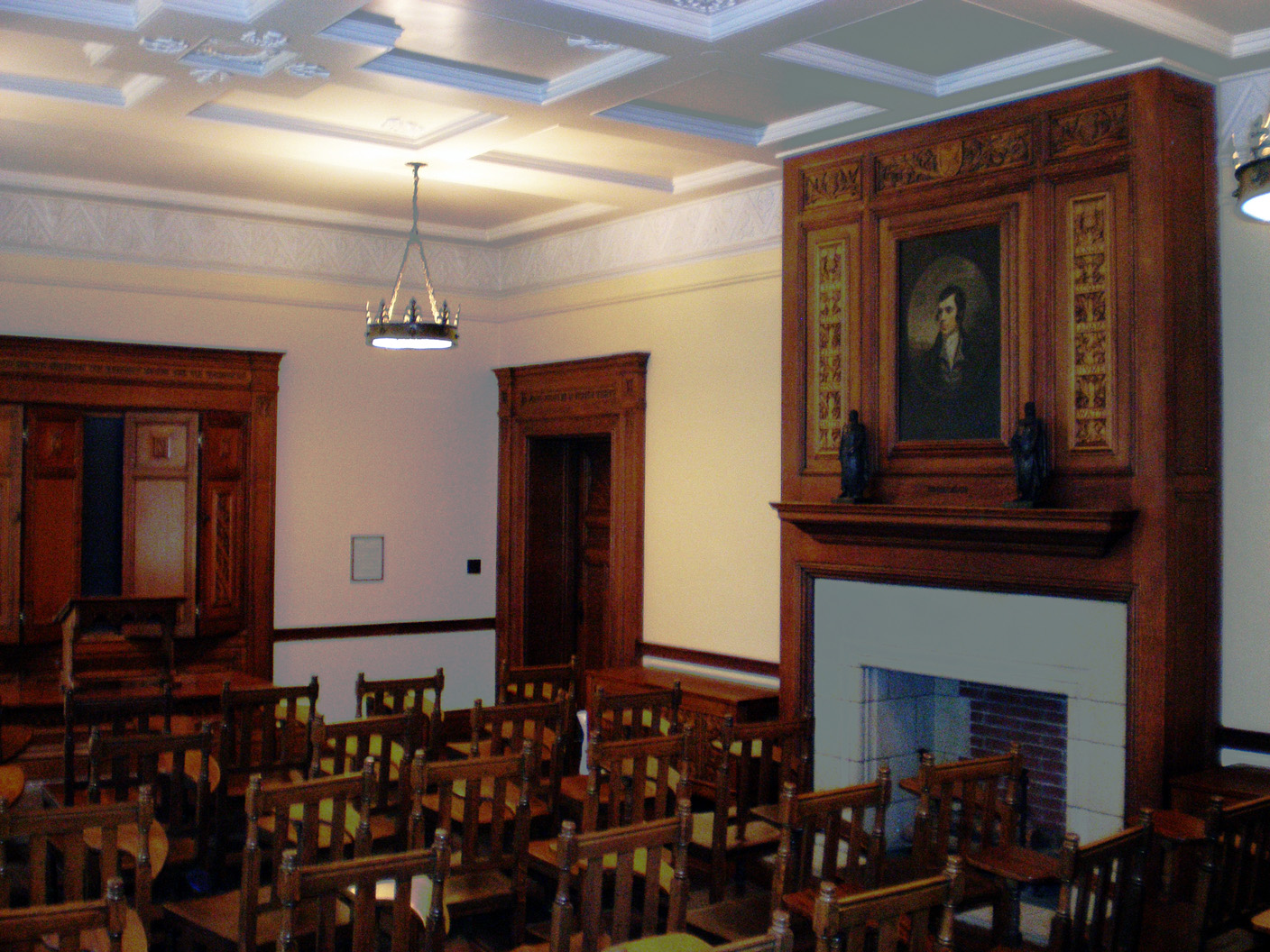
Scottish Room

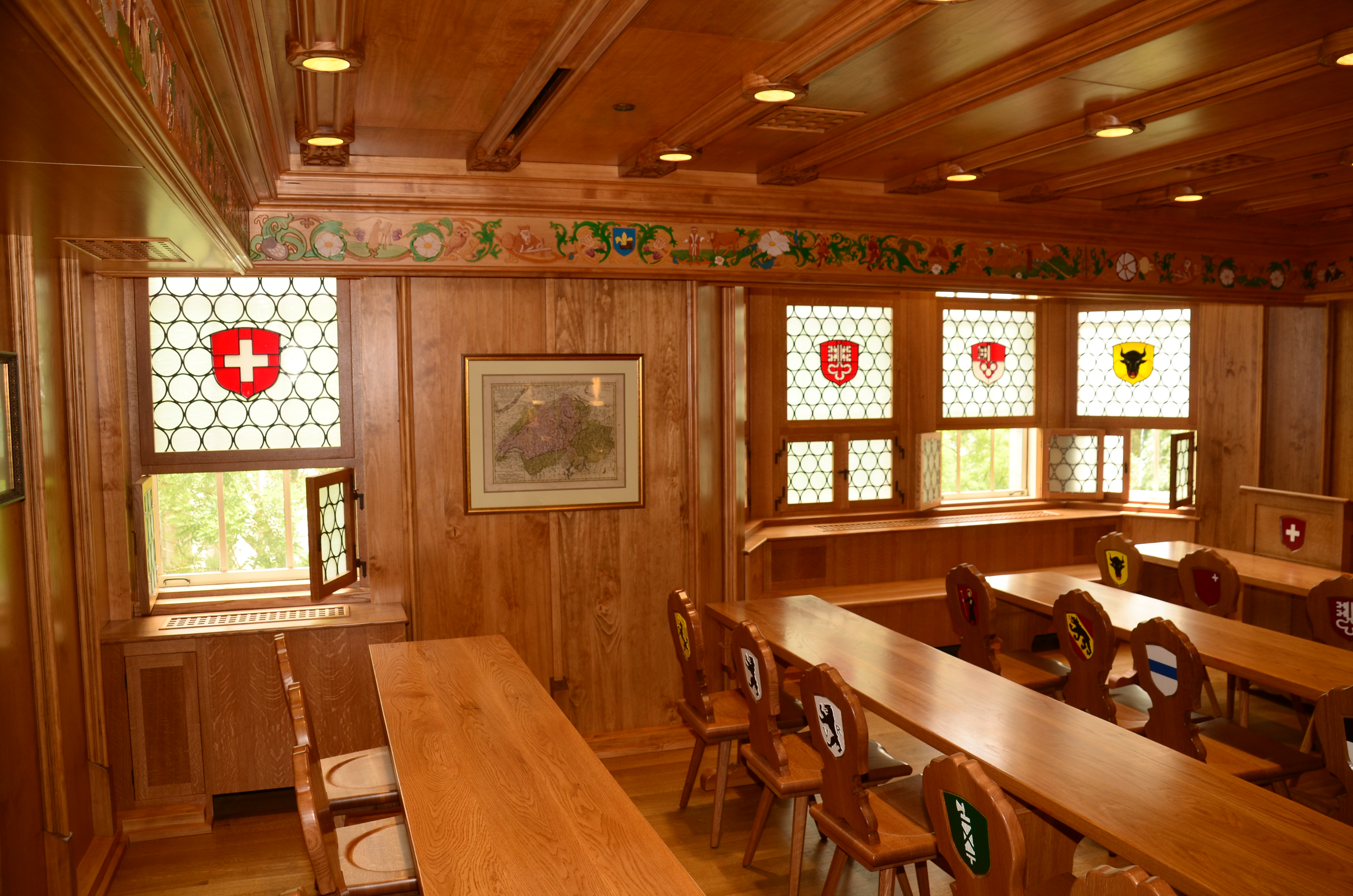
Swiss Room

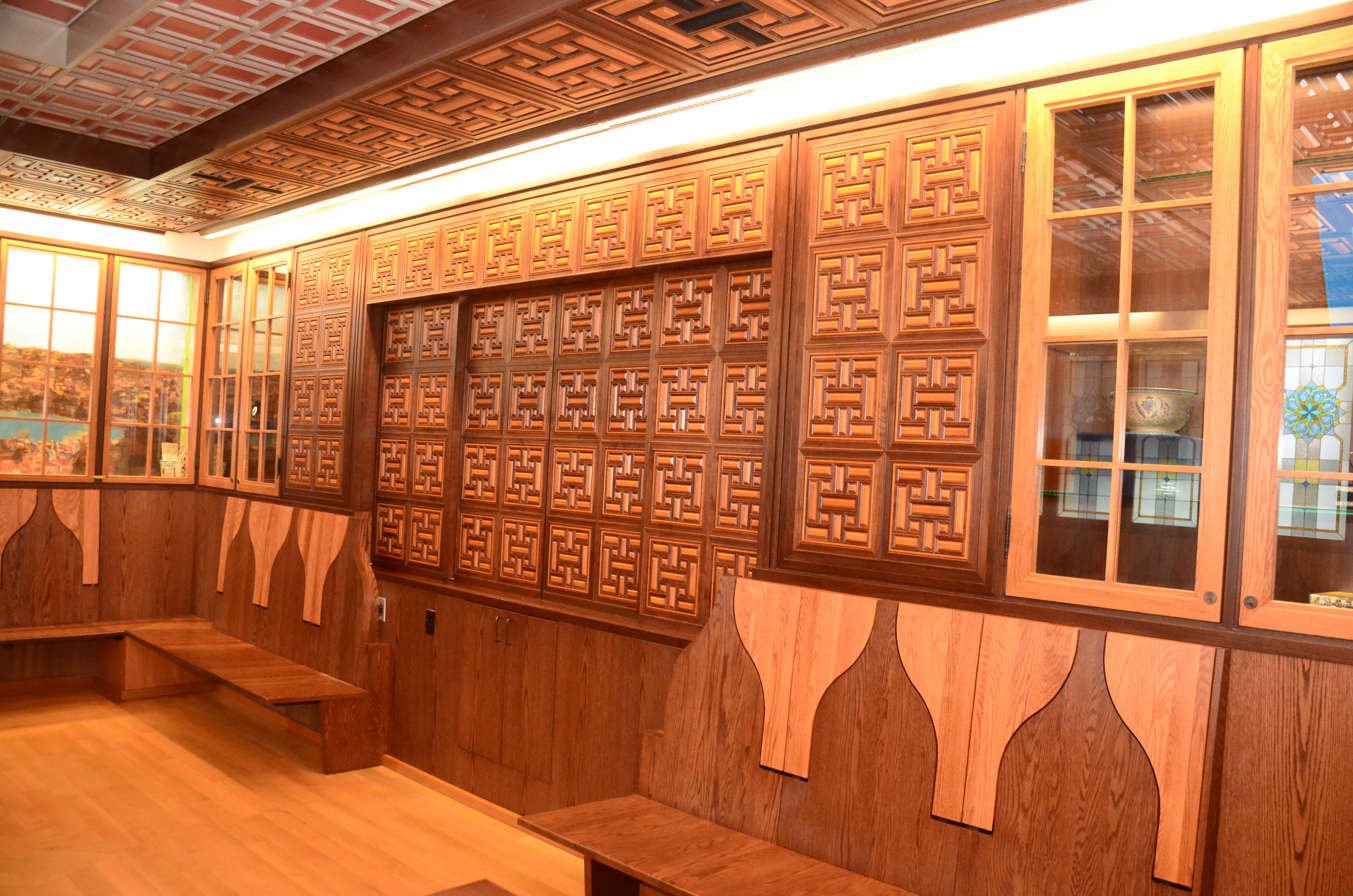
Turkish Classroom

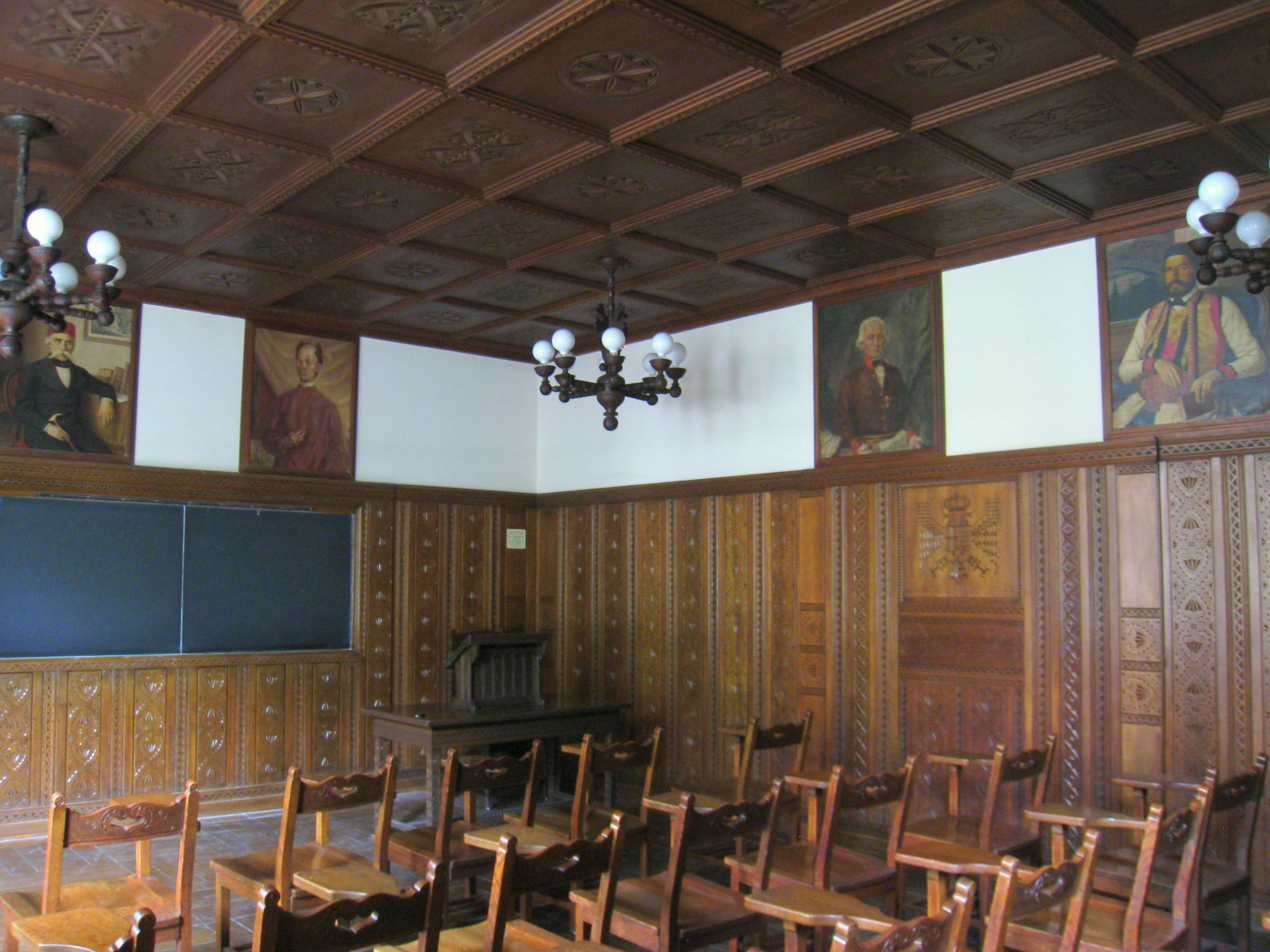
Yugoslav Room

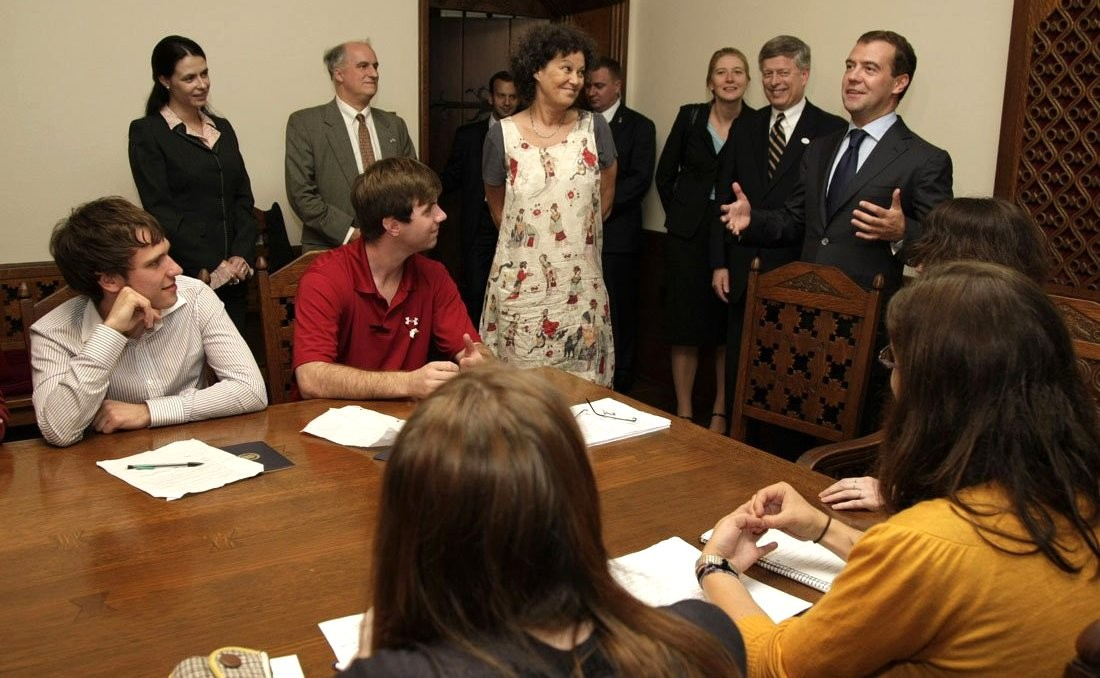
Russian president Dmitry Medvedev meets with students in the Russian Room on September 24, 2009.
