= Omer Akin =

Turkish-American Architecture Professor (1946 - 2020)

Ömer Akın
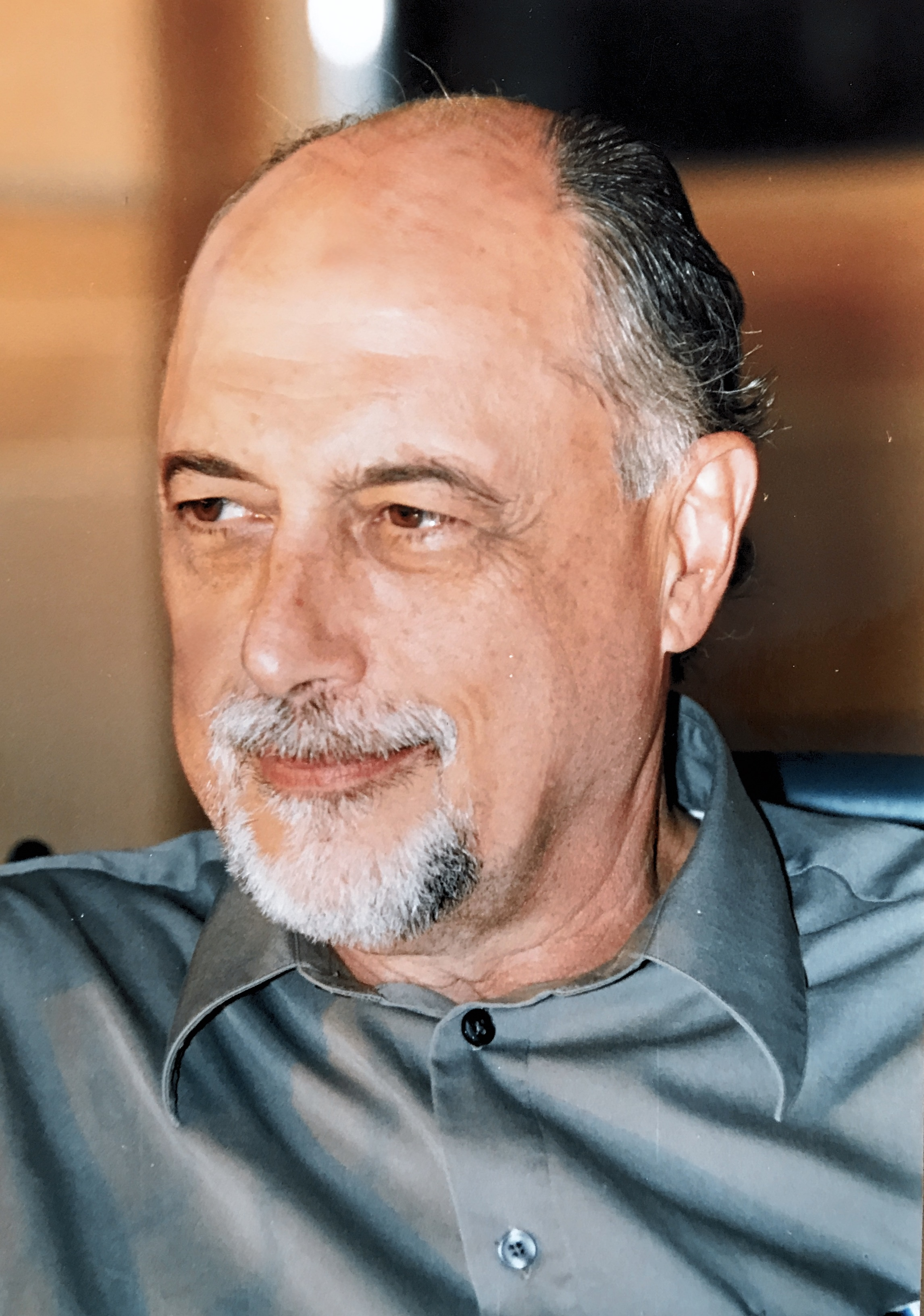
- Akın in 2000
- Born: June 30, 1946; Eskişehir, Turkey
- Died: March 13, 2020 (aged 73); Pittsburgh, Pennsylvania, U.S.
- Occupation: Professor of Architecture

Academic background
- Education: Carnegie Mellon University

Academic work
- Institutions: Carnegie Mellon University
- Main interests: Architecture; Design; Decision Theory
- Notable works: Turkish Nationality Room

Ömer Akın (June 30, 1946 – March 13, 2020) was an architect, researcher, and educator. He taught at the School of Architecture at Carnegie Mellon University from 1977 until he retired in 2017. He served as Head of the Department of Architecture from 1981 to 1987.

Akin designed the Turkish Nationality Room at the University of Pittsburgh.

== Books ==
Akin conducted research and published on topics including design cognition, generative Computer-Aided Design (CAD), ethical decision making, and building commissioning.

- Akin, Omer; Weinel, Eleanor F., eds. (1982). Representation and Architecture. Information Dynamics.
- Akin, Omer (1986). Psychology of Architectural Design. Pion Limited. ISBN 9780850861204.
- Akin, Omer; Krishnamurti, Ramesh; Lam, Khee Poh, eds. (2004). Generative CAD Systems. School of Architecture, Carnegie Mellon University. ISBN 9780976294108.
- Akin, Omer (2006). A Cartesian Approach to Design Rationality. Middle East Technical University. ISBN 9789754292459.
- Akin, Omer (2011). Embedded Commissioning of Building Systems. Artech House Publishers. ISBN 9781608071470.
