= History of Pittsburgh Panthers football =

The Pittsburgh Panthers team represents the University of Pittsburgh in American football.

== Overview ==
=== Early history (1889–1902) ===
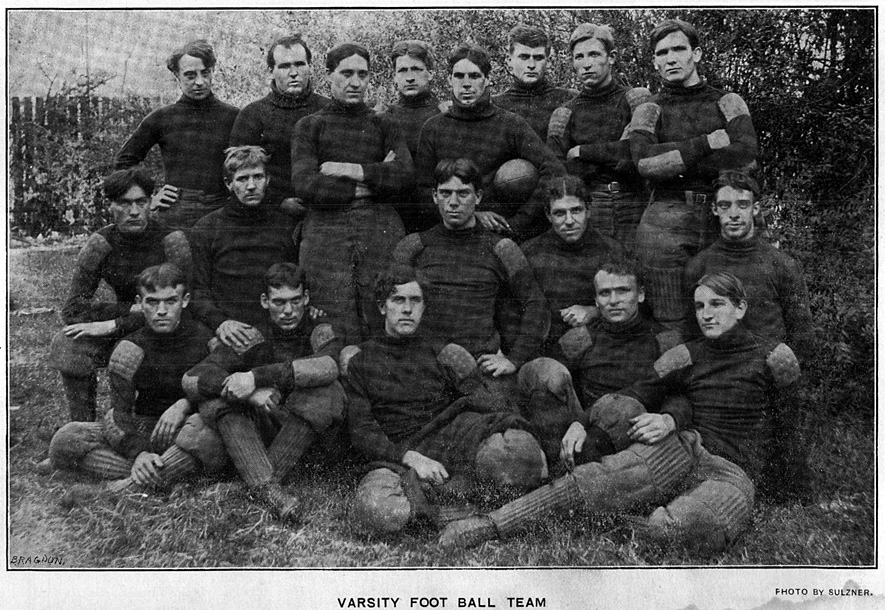
The 1900 team, competing when the university was still known as WUP, went 5–4 shutting out opponents four times under head coach Dr. M. Roy Jackson

Football at the University of Pittsburgh began in the fall of 1889 when the school was still known as the Western University of Pennsylvania, often referred to as WUP, and was located in what was then known as Allegheny City and is today the city of Pittsburgh's North Side. A 130-pound WUP student, Bert Smyers, along with senior student John Scott, assembled a football team that year composed of only three players who had previously witnessed the sport. The team played in one informal game, a loss against Shady Side Academy, in which Smyers made himself quarterback and Scott played center. In preparation for the following year, the first season of football officially recognized by the university, Smyers and his teammates took up a collection and purchased a football for practices and games; players were responsible for their own uniforms. In Smyers' case, his uniform was pieced together by his mother and sister. The first official game for the university was played on October 11, 1890, when the Allegheny Athletic Association's opponent, Shadyside Academy, failed to appear for its game at Exposition Park. Allegheny A.A. called Smyers who brought the WUP team as a replacement. In an inglorious start to Pitt football history, WUP was defeated 38–0. Smyers' team next faced Washington and Jefferson College, losing 32–0, but closed out its inaugural three game season with the university's first win, a 10–4 victory over Geneva College. The following season saw the university collect more losses en route to a 2–5 record. Smyers suffered a broken nose in a 40–6 loss to Washington and Jefferson, a school that would become one of WUP's fiercest early rivals. The WUP team did record the school's first shutout with a 6–0 win over Geneva, as well as the school's first blowout in a 54–0 win over Western Pennsylvania Medical College who became affiliated with WUP in 1892 and later became the university's medical school when they merged in 1908. Perhaps the most important development for the second season of football was Smyers recruitment of Joseph Trees from Normal University of Pennsylvania. The 210 pound Trees became WUP's first subsidized athlete and, later in life, made millions in the oil industry and became an important benefactor for the university and athletic department. Today, Trees Hall, an athletic facility on the University of Pittsburgh's main campus in the Oakland section of Pittsburgh, bears his name. The first winning record for the university came in the third season of competition in 1892, when the team posted a 4–2 record. The following season in 1893, the team had its first official coach, Anson F. Harrold, who led the team to an unremarkable 1–4 record. However, during that season the first contest was played in what would become a 100-game series versus Penn State, thus originating one of the longest and fiercest rivalries for both schools. In 1895, the school suffered a 1–6 season under coach J.P. Linn. The 1895 season was notable for the first Backyard Brawl on October 26, 1895, with WUP losing to West Virginia 8–0 in Wheeling, West Virginia. The university did not see another winning season until Fred Robinson led WUP to a 5–2–1 record in 1898. In 1899, Robinson continued his success with a 3–1–1 record, giving the school its first back-to-back winning seasons. This was followed by two more consecutive winning seasons, including a record seven-win season in 1901 under coach Wilbur Hockensmith. That season, Hockensmith led the school to its first victory over West Virginia, a 12–0 shutout in Morgantown on October 5, 1901.

=== Mosse, Thompson, and Duff (1903–1913) ===
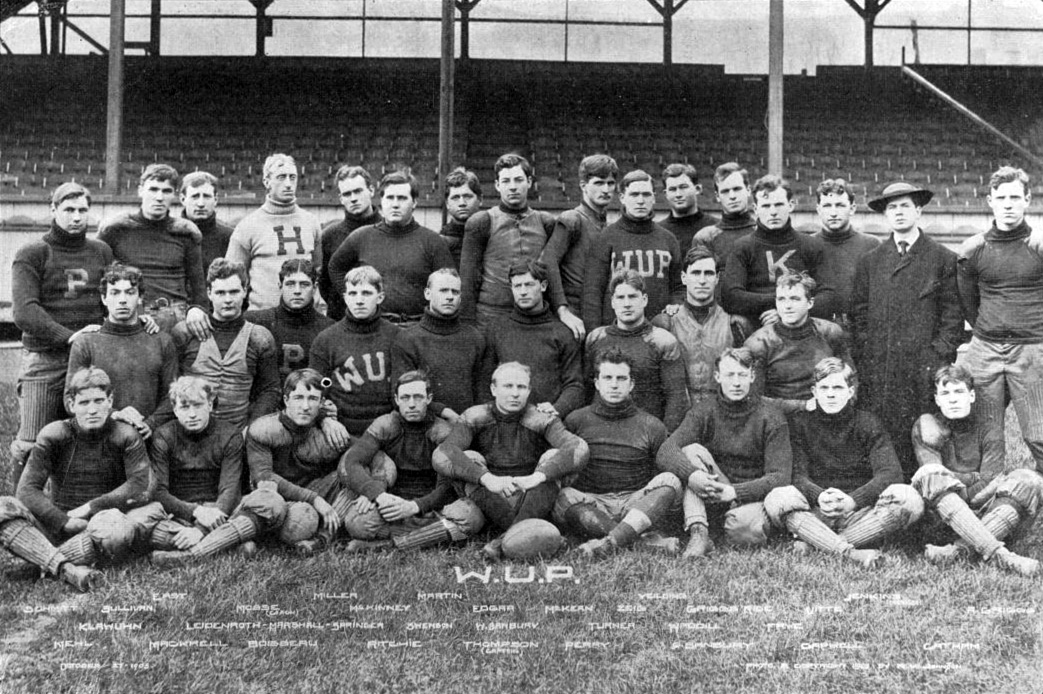
The 1905 football team was Arthur Mosse's last season as head coach in Pittsburgh. This team would go 10–2 while outscoring its opponents 405–36. Joseph H. Thompson, center of the front row, was the team captain.

In the early years of the 20th century, interest in college football grew both in Pittsburgh and throughout the nation. In 1903, Arthur St. Leger "Texas" Mosse was hired away from the University of Kansas, and brought several of his players with him. Other players were recruited from surrounding Western Pennsylvania colleges, including star half back Joseph H. Thompson. The 1903 season, the first under Mosse, was the university's first winless season at 0–9–1. (Note: The University of Pittsburgh's football media guide does not list a 10–6 loss to Duquesne University for the 1903 season, although it appears in the Duquesne football media guide and on College Football Data Warehouse. Therefore, the Pitt football media guide lists the record for the 1903 season as 0–8–1, and Mosse's overall record at the university as 20–10–1. College Football Data Warehouse, whose numbers are used in this article, lists Mosse's 1903 record as 0–9–1, and his overall Pitt record as 20–11–1.) In perhaps one of the greatest turnarounds in college football history, Mosse led WUP to an undefeated 10–0 season, the school's first, in 1904. The 1904 team surrendered only one touchdown on the way to collectively outscoring opponents 406–5. That season also saw the school's first victory over Penn State, a 22–5 rout, as well as a 53–0 shutout of West Virginia. (Note: Various sources list the score of the 1904 Penn State win as 24–5, 23–5, and 22–5. The score of 22–5 from the Courant, a monthly student journal of the Western University of Pennsylvania, is identical to how the score is listed at College Football Data Warehouse, and when used to calculate the total season points scored, matches the total listed above as reported in the book Pitt: The Story of the University of Pittsburgh 1787–1987: 406–5.) The success of this period can be partially attributed to actions taken by the university's administration, led by newly installed chancellor Samuel McCormick who took special interest in athletics at the university. Encouraged by university trustee George Hubberd Clapp, the administration more actively engaged in supporting the athletic program during this period in order to promote the university. A football association was formed, the school's first booster organization, whose largest initial contributor was Andrew W. Mellon. The university also obtained a lease of Exposition Park to give the football team a more stable and permanent home, and its first full season at the park began with the 1904 undefeated team. This undefeated 1904 season was followed by a 10–2 record under Mosse in 1905, as well as six additional winning seasons.

These Mosse coached squads featured team captain Joe Thompson, who was recruited from Geneva College to play for WUP from 1904 to 1906. During Thompson's playing years, the team compiled a 26–6 record. Thompson graduated from the university in 1905 and continued on with post-graduate work in the School of Law completing his law degree. However, Thompson had long desired the head coaching position and finally obtained the job in 1909, after successful coach John A. Moorhead, who helped facilitate the first known use of numbers on the uniforms of football players in 1908, (Note: The Official NCAA Records Book credits Washington & Jefferson as being the first documented college football team to use uniform numbers in 1908, although photographic evidence indicates that numbers were worn by the 1907 WUP football team.) left coaching to pursue his family's business interests. That same year, the university changed its name from Western University of Pennsylvania to the University of Pittsburgh, and it soon became known as "Pitt" among fans and students. The following year, in 1909, the school officially adopted the Panther as a mascot. Also in 1909, the school moved to the Oakland section of Pittsburgh where it remains to this day, and the football team began playing games at Forbes Field, starting with the third game of the season against Bucknell on October 16, 1909.

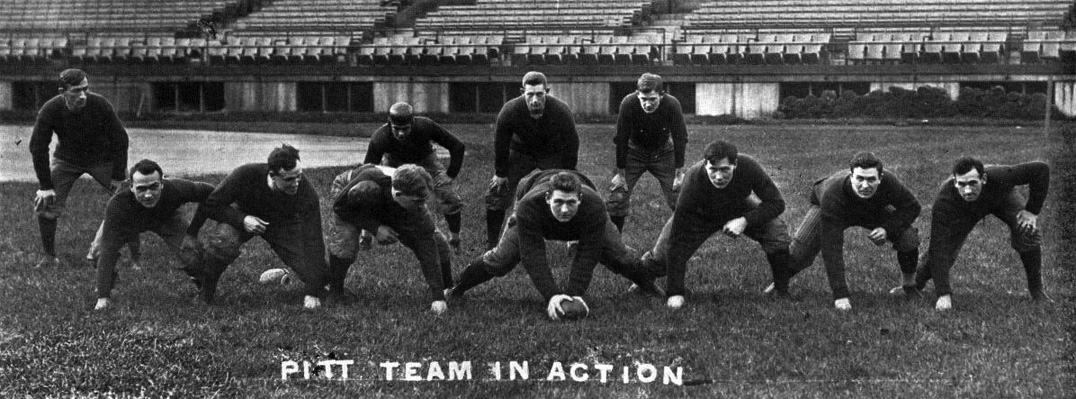
The 1910 team went undefeated and unscored upon, and is considered by many to be the 1910 national champion

Thompson coached at Pitt until 1912, the longest tenure of any coach to that point, and led the football team to a 22–11–2 record. The highlight of his coaching tenure was the 1910 season in which Pitt, led by star fullback Tex Richards, went undefeated for the second time in school history. Of even greater significance, the 1910 team was unscored upon, collectively outscoring its 9 opponents 282–0, and is considered by many to be that season's national champion. Following his coaching stint, Thompson went on to become a highly decorated hero of World War I. Winning continued under coach Joseph Duff, including an 8–1 record in 1914 in which opponents were collectively outscored 207–38, and the university was well on the way to establishing itself as a regional, if not yet national, power. Duff would leave the Panthers after two seasons to serve in World War I, where he would be killed in combat in October 1918.

=== Pop Warner era (1914–1923) ===
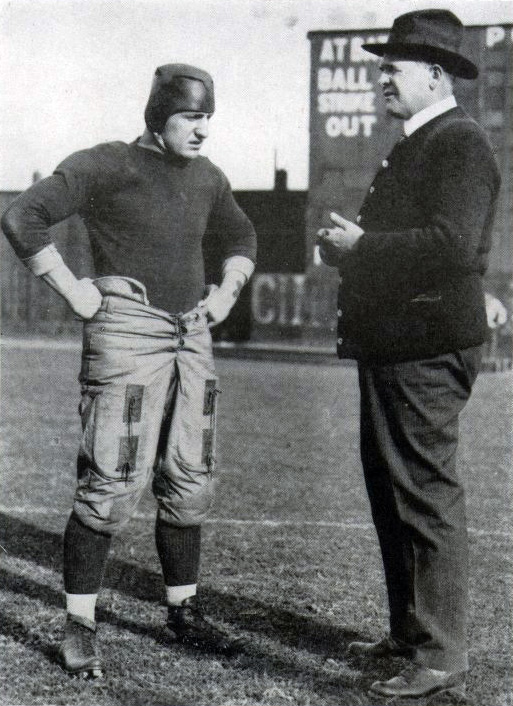
Hall of fame head football coach Pop Warner (right) with three-time All-American and team captain Bob Peck during the 1916 national championship season

In 1914, Pitt athletic booster Joseph Trees and athletic director A. R. Hamilton hired Pop Warner as Pitt's head coach. Warner, who had previously led Carlisle, Cornell, and Georgia, had been successful at his previous stops, mentoring the likes of Jim Thorpe, and was known as an innovator of the game who originated the screen pass, single- and double-wing formations, and use of shoulder and thigh pads. His arrival at Pitt gave the program instant national credibility, lifting the perception of the program from a regional power to that of a national one. Warner's impact was immediate. Led by center Robert Peck, Pitt's first First Team All-American, and All-American end James Pat Herron, Warner's first Pitt team in 1915 went 8–0, shutting out five opponents, and was trumpeted by football historian Parke H. Davis as that season's national champion. His second season duplicated that success, repeating an 8–0 record while collectively outscoring opponents 255–25, and garnering what is widely regarded as a consensus national championship. The lone scare of the 1916 season occurred at Navy when, following a delay of the team's train heading to Annapolis that caused a late arrival, the team overcame several fumbles and eked out a 20–19 victory. The 1916 team was led again by Herron and Peck, now in his last season, as well as All-Americans fullback Andy Hastings and guard "Tiny" Thornhill. Also on that team were Jock Sutherland and H.C. "Doc" Carlson, who both would garner First Team All-American selections while members of the undefeated 1917 team, and go on to become perhaps Pitt's most legendary coaches in football and basketball, respectively. The 1917 team, nicknamed "The Fighting Dentists" because over half the roster became doctors or dentists, finished 10–0 with five shutouts despite losing several players to military service at the outbreak of World War I. The Spanish flu pandemic of 1918, which took the life of former Pitt star Tex Richards, saw the implementation of quarantines that eliminated much of that year's college football season, including five of Pitt's originally scheduled contests. All of Pitt's games that year were played in November, including a high-profile game played as a War Charities benefit against undefeated, unscored upon, and defending national champion Georgia Tech, coached by the legendary John Heisman. Pitt swept through its first two games and then dismantled Georgia Tech 32–0 in front of many of the nation's top sports writers including Walter Camp. The final game of the season at Cleveland Naval Reserve resulted in Warner's first loss at Pitt and is one of the most controversial in school history. Warner, along with some reporters covering the game, insisted Pitt was robbed by the officials who, claiming the official timekeeper's watch was broken, arbitrarily ended the first half before Pitt was able to score and then allowed the Reserves extra time in the fourth quarter to pull ahead 10–9 before calling an end to the game. Despite the loss, the 4–1 Panthers of 1918 were named by multiple selectors as a national champion for that season.

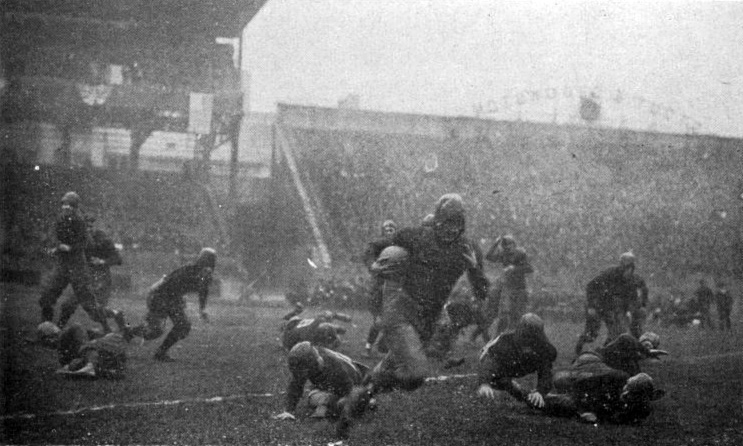
Pitt's Tom Davies runs against undefeated and unscored upon Georgia Tech in the 1918 game at Forbes Field. Pitt won the game 32–0 and is considered by many to be that season's national champion.

In 1919, several players suffered season-ending injuries, and Pitt stumbled to a 6–2–1 record that included another victory over Georgia Tech. The Panthers returned to undefeated status during 1920, albeit with ties against Syracuse and undefeated Penn State. The Penn State game ended in a scoreless tie after Pitt star Tom Davies, who was injured early in the game, returned later to miss a possible game-winning field goal. For the 1921 season, the team's record dipped to 5–3–1, but Pitt made college football history on October 8, 1921. Harold W. Arlin announced the first live radio broadcast of a college football game in the United States from Forbes Field on KDKA radio as the Pitt Panthers defeated West Virginia 21–13 in the annual Backyard Brawl.

Prior to the 1922 season, Warner announced he was leaving Pitt to take the head coaching position at Stanford, but he honored his contract and remained at Pitt through 1923. 1922 resulted in an 8–2 record, and the season ended on a high note when the Panthers took their first cross-country trip, by train, to defeat Stanford, coached by two Pitt assistants sent ahead by Warner, 16–7 at Stanford. Warner's final season was his worst at Pitt as the Panthers stumbled to a 5–4 record in 1923. However, the Warner era at Pitt closed on a high note with a 20–3 victory over Penn State on November 29. In all, Warner coached his Pitt teams to 33 straight wins and three national championships (1915, 1916 and 1918). He coached Pittsburgh from 1915 to 1923 to a combined 60–12–4 record. Warner helped raise the interest in Pitt football to the point where the university sought to build an on-campus stadium with increased seating capacity that would be dedicated to the football team, and the school began taking steps to secure the necessary land and funds to build Pitt Stadium.

=== Jock Sutherland era (1924–1938) ===
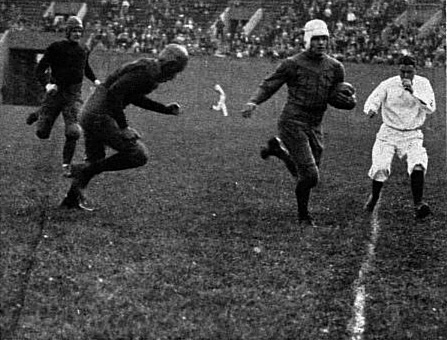
Gibby Welch tied a school record with this 105-yard kickoff return against West Virginia in 1927. Pitt won the game 40–0.

A natural replacement for Pop Warner was Jock Sutherland, Warner's former All-American guard on the 1915 and 1916 national championship teams and 1917 undefeated team. A native of Coupar Angus in Scotland, Sutherland had graduated from the University of Pittsburgh's School of Dentistry, where he later served as faculty. Sutherland had served a tour in the Army and later achieved success as the head coach of Lafayette College from 1919 to 1923, leading the Leopards to the 1921 Eastern Collegiate Championship and shutting out Warner's Pitt teams in 1921 and 1922. So it was in 1924 that Sutherland returned to his alma mater to assume the head coaching duties with the goal of constructing dominant teams built on power and speed. After a 5–3–1 record in his first season, Sutherland's second season kicked off the Panthers' first in the newly constructed Pitt Stadium and saw the team achieve an 8–1 record and win the 1925 Eastern Championship. The following year, the Panthers featured Gibby Welch, who led the nation in rushing in 1926 and helped Pitt to the Eastern Championship and its first bowl game, the Rose Bowl, in 1927. Pitt, ironically, lost the Rose Bowl 7–6 to a Stanford team headed by the Panthers' former coach, Pop Warner. In 1929, Pitt went undefeated in the regular season, the first of four undefeated regular seasons under Sutherland, and won the Eastern Championship, but lost its second appearance in the Rose Bowl to USC. Bowls at the time were still considered by many to be exhibition games, and the loss did not prevent football historian Parke Davis from naming Pitt as that season's national champion.

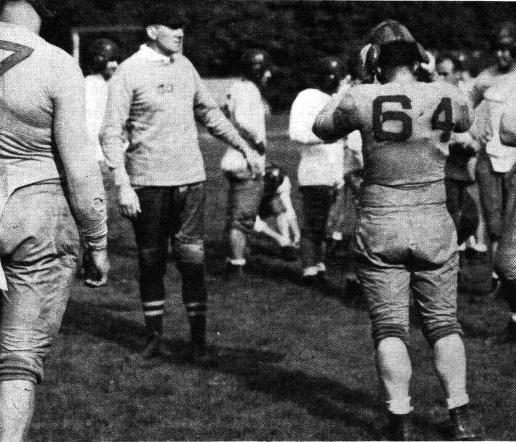
Jock Sutherland running a practice in 1935

The 1930 season, at 6–2–1, was a rebuilding one for Sutherland, and was marked by a loss to Notre Dame that would be the only meeting between Sutherland and Knute Rockne due to his death in a 1931 plane crash. The Irish also spoiled Pitt's perfect season in a 1931 game at South Bend, although the Panthers finished 8–1 with six shutouts, including a 40–0 dismantling of Nebraska. That season also saw Pitt defeat Penn State in State College, using only one first-string player, by a score of 41–6 en route to winning the Eastern Championship. These accomplishments would prompt Parke Davis to again name the Panthers national champions. Pitt would exact revenge at home the following season by shutting out Notre Dame 12–0, and would also upend undefeated Penn in Philadelphia, as well as shut out Stanford at home on their way to the 1932 Eastern Championship. However, the season ended when the Panthers, in their third Rose Bowl, were again defeated by USC. The 1933 season was spoiled only by a 7–3 loss at Minnesota in which the Panthers fumbled twice inside their own 5-yard line. Minnesota would best Pitt again in 1934, when the Panthers squandered a third quarter lead to lose 13–7 to the undefeated Gophers. However, in 1934 Pitt also won at Nebraska 25–6, shut out Notre Dame 19–0, its third victory in a row over the Irish, and got revenge for the previous Rose Bowl losses to USC by defeating the Trojans 20–6 at Pitt Stadium. With these victories Pitt was named Eastern Champions as well as being awarded a share of the national championship by Parke Davis. Pitt underwent rebuilding in 1935, going 7–1–2. Of historic note, in 1935, Pitt battled then football powerhouse Fordham, who featured the Seven Blocks of Granite which included guard Vince Lombardi, to the first of what would be three consecutive scoreless ties at New York City's Polo Grounds. Pitt ended the season with a 12–7 win at USC.

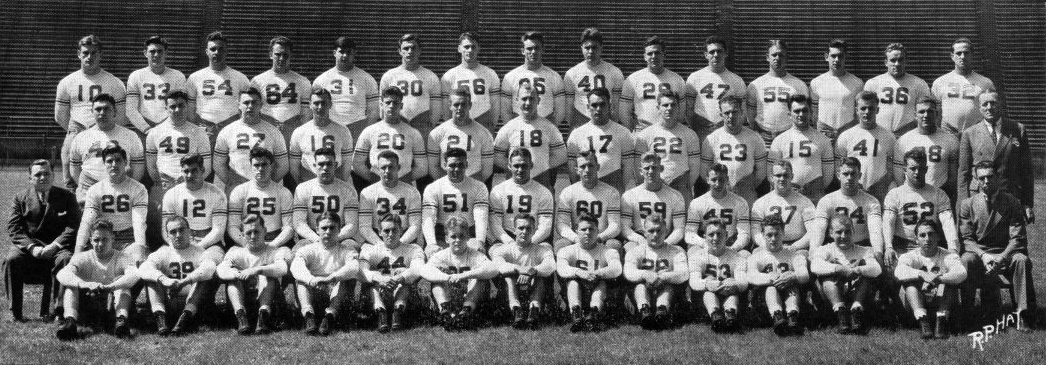
The 1937 undefeated national championship team

One of the greatest back-to-back stretches in Pitt football history occurred during the 1936 and 1937 seasons which featured Heisman Trophy candidate and Hall of Fame running back Marshall Goldberg. In 1936, Pitt shut out five of its opponents, including a 34–0 win over West Virginia, a 6–0 victory at Ohio State, and a 26–0 win over Notre Dame in which the Irish did not achieve a first down until late in the third quarter. The Panthers also won at Nebraska 19–6 and defeated Penn State 24–7. Only the second of three consecutive scoreless ties at the Polo Grounds against Fordham, and a mid-October 7–0 upset loss against crosstown rival Duquesne, marred the record. The Panthers finished the regular season winning the Lambert-Meadowlands Trophy as Eastern Champions and ranked third in the Associated Press Poll, the inaugural year of the poll, whose rankings were finalized before the bowl season. Pitt accepted a bid to the Rose Bowl to face Washington, and this time Sutherland was determined not to lose again out west. To avoid subpar play following the cross country train trip, Sutherland took his team out two weeks early to allow for adequate preparation. These moves paid off with a 21–0 rout of Washington which led many selectors to name Pitt as the 1936 national champions. However, it was during this time that the seeds of a rift between Sutherland and the university's administration were being sown, partly initiated by the refusal of the university to supply pocket money for players during the Rose Bowl trip, which Sutherland then decided to supply out of his own pocket. Pitt followed up the Rose Bowl winning 1936 season with a 9–0–1 record in 1937 that included five shutouts, including those over West Virginia, Wisconsin, and at Duke as well as additional victories against Penn State, Nebraska, and at Notre Dame. The only blemish on the record was the third consecutive tie at Fordham, which resulted when an apparent winning touchdown by Pitt's Marshall Goldberg was called back on a holding penalty. Pitt finished the 1937 regular season as repeat Eastern Champions and was ranked number one in the AP's final poll. Partly due to the developing rift with the university administration, and also due to the time and expense of the travel, Pitt became the first team to publicly decline a Rose Bowl invitation following a vote of the players. Despite its decision to sit out the postseason, the 1937 Pitt team was widely regarded as consensus national champions.

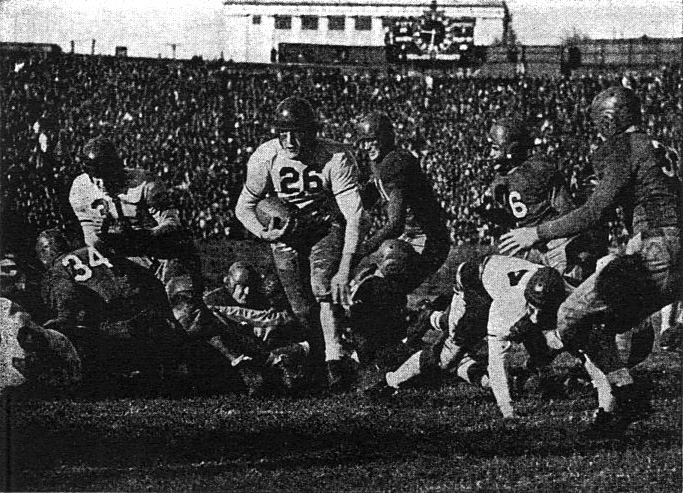
Ben Kish (26) is sprung by a Ted Konestsky (31) block in a 1938 34–7 Pitt romp over Southern Methodist at Pitt Stadium

During this period, Pitt regularly dominated opposing teams, even inducing Notre Dame to drop Pitt from its schedule. However, it was also during this era that the university, led by chancellor John Gabbert Bowman, began introducing policies designed to de-emphasize the athletic programs. This was manifested when a plan was instituted in the spring of 1937 by Athletic Director James "Whitey" Hagan, who had actually played for Sutherland, to eliminate university subsidies for athletes. Hagan's plan was then absorbed into a 1938 athletics code of conduct, referred to as "Code Bowman", which discouraged alumni help, restricted practices to two hours a day, and eliminated both athletic recruiting and all direct subsidization of athletics. While the implementation of these policies was the beginning of the end for that era of Pitt football prominence, the Panthers still impressed during the 1938 season behind an assembly of talent at running back labeled the "Dream Backfield." With Goldberg at fullback, Dick Cassiano and Harold Stebbins at halfback, and John Chickerneo at quarterback, Pitt won at Wisconsin, shut out West Virginia and Penn State at home and Nebraska on the road, and routed Southern Methodist. Notably, the deadlock against Fordham was finally broken as Pitt defeated the Rams 24–13 at Pitt Stadium. However, Pitt was tripped up against neighboring rival Carnegie Tech and at undefeated Duke. Following the season, the split between the administration and Sutherland became complete, and Sutherland resigned in March saying "The present system of athletic administration has resulted in conditions which, for me, are intolerable." The resignation caused a firestorm in the press and among the program's supporters, and resulted in student outrage and protests. However, the athletic code was firmly implemented and Sutherland's resignation stood.

Sutherland, who was described as "a national hero" in a Saturday Evening Post article, was perhaps the most highly admired and influential coach in the history of the university. Following his years at Pitt he never coached again in college and moved on to a career in the NFL including a head coaching stint with the Pittsburgh Steelers before his untimely death in 1948 of a brain tumor. During his 15-year tenure at the university, the longest of any football coach at Pitt, he compiled a record of 111–20–12 which included 79 shutouts. Sutherland never lost to rival Penn State and lost only once to West Virginia, and his teams were named Eastern football champions seven times: 1925, 1927, 1929, 1931, 1934, 1936, and 1937. During this time, Pitt appeared in four Rose Bowl games (1928, 1930, 1933, and 1937) and turned down a bid for the 1938 Rose Bowl. Sutherland's teams were named "National Champions" by various selectors for nine different seasons including 1925, 1927, 1929, 1931, 1933, 1934, 1936, 1937, and 1938. Of these, the University of Pittsburgh officially recognizes five of those years as national championship seasons: 1929, 1931, 1934, 1936, and 1937.

=== Bowser, Shaughgnessy, Milligan, and Cassanova (1939–1955) ===
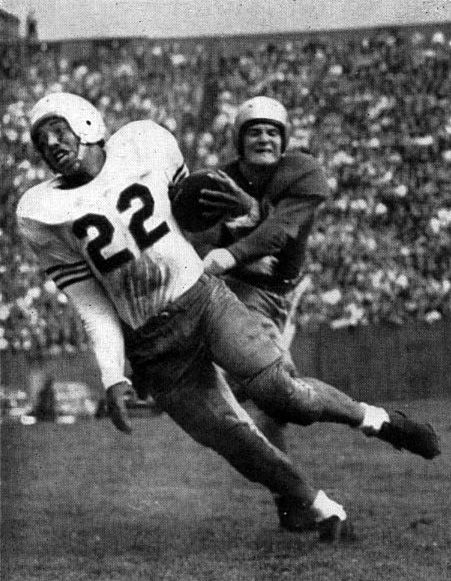
Jimmy Joe Robinson carrying the ball against Notre Dame in 1948

The policy of deemphasis resulted in a dramatic downturn for Pitt's football fortunes, including a succession of coaches with short stints. Charley Bowser, a former player at Pitt under Pop Warner, took over in 1939, but the lack of athletic subsidies had eroded the talent base and the on-field results likewise steadily deteriorated. Bowser started 3–0 in 1939 and Pitt was ranked number one in the AP poll, but won only two more games and finished 5–4. Eight consecutive losing seasons followed. Pitt's stars during this period were running back Edgar "Special Delivery" Jones and guard Ralph Fife, who led Pitt to an upset win over undefeated Fordham in 1941.

Bowser was replaced by Clark Shaughnessy in 1943; and in 1945, with new university chancellor Rufus Fitzgerald at the helm, athletic scholarships and recruiting were reinstated. However, substantial damage had already been done to the football program. Shaughnessy was replaced in 1946 by Wes Fesler, who left after his only season at Pitt to coach his alma mater Ohio State. Walter "Mike" Milligan took over head coaching duties in 1947 and scored one of the most satisfying wins in Pitt history when the Panthers defeated the Fesler-coached Ohio State team 12–0 for their only win of the season. During this era Pitt's first African-American player, Jimmy Joe Robinson, led the team in receiving and rushing, and also excelled at returning punts and kickoffs. Milligan brought Pitt back to winning records in 1948 and 1949, achieving consecutive 6–3 seasons that included appearances in the national rankings and back-to-back shutouts of Penn State. However, Milligan resigned after the 1949 season, never to return to head coaching, due to a perceived snub by the university offering him only a one-year contract. During this same period, Pitt sought entry into the Big Ten Conference as the replacement for the University of Chicago, which had withdrawn from the conference. Pitt had placed its athletic programs under the Big Ten's supervision in 1939, which newspapers of the time characterized as a probationary admission likely to result in eventual full membership. Pitt's application for membership was never approved, partly due to opposition by Ohio State, out of their concern that conference membership for Pittsburgh would diminish a possible recruiting advantage such membership gave to the Buckeyes in talent-rich Pennsylvania. Instead, Michigan State, rather than Pitt, was eventually selected for Big Ten membership in May 1949.

Len Casanova took the Pitt job in 1950 but a disastrous campaign was followed by his departure following spring practice in 1951. This led to athletic director Tom Hamilton taking the reins of the team on an interim basis for the 1951 season. In 1952 Red Dawson took over, and the Panthers, led by future Hall of Famer Joe Schmidt, scored a huge upset at Notre Dame, then coached by Frank Leahy, en route to a 6–3 record. However, a losing record followed in 1953, and after three losses to start the 1954 season, and due to poor health, Dawson stepped down. For the remainder of the season Hamilton again took over the team, guiding Pitt to an upset of number nine Navy and handing West Virginia its only loss of the season.

=== John Michelosen era (1955–1965) ===
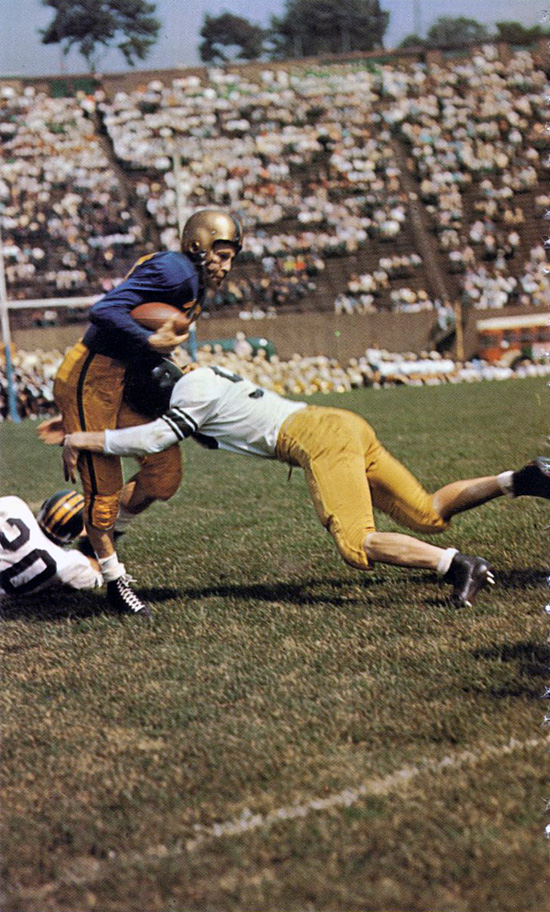
Pitt advancing the ball in a 27–7 win over Cal in a 1955 game at Pitt Stadium

In 1955 Pitt sought a return to the roots of its previous success by turning to John Michelosen, a quarterback on Jock Sutherland's 1936 and 1937 championship teams who later served as a Sutherland assistant and as the head coach of the Pittsburgh Steelers. Michelosen immediately brought Pitt football back to respectability in his first season with the 1955 Eastern Championship that was capped by an appearance in the 1956 Sugar Bowl. Pitt's invitation to the Sugar Bowl was surrounded by controversy because Pitt, an integrated team, was the first to bring an African-American, Bobby Grier, to play in a southeastern bowl game in the segregated Deep South. There had been controversy over whether Grier should be allowed to play due to his race, and whether Georgia Tech should even play at all due to Georgia's Governor Marvin Griffin's opposition to racial integration. After Griffin publicly sent a telegram to the state's Board Of Regents requesting Georgia Tech not to engage in racially integrated events, Georgia Tech's president Blake R. Van Leer rejected the request and threatened to resign. The game went on as planned Grier's play in the Sugar Bowl cemented the university's place in civil rights history as the first team to break the color barrier for southeastern bowls. However, the game was marred by protests in the South leading up to the game, which Pitt lost 7–0 when a controversial interference penalty was called on Grier that set up the winning touchdown for Georgia Tech. The following season, Michelosen guided Pitt to another bowl berth, the Gator Bowl, which resulted in another seven-point loss to Georgia Tech.

Four additional winning seasons followed against formidable national schedules that were highlighted by victories over Notre Dame, USC, Miami, UCLA, Penn State, Oregon, Syracuse, Nebraska, and West Virginia. A three win season in 1961 that included wins at Miami and over Navy and USC, along with three close losses by 6 points or less to Baylor, Washington, and Notre Dame, was followed by a 5–5 record in 1962 and then perhaps the best team of the Micheloson era in 1963. The 1963 team, led by All-American Paul Martha, swept through a schedule that included wins at Notre Dame, UCLA, West Virginia, and Miami and home victories against Washington, Cal, Syracuse, and Penn State. The only loss of the season was in late October at Navy, which was led by Roger Staubach and would finish the season ranked second in the nation. The Panthers, at 7–1 and ranked fourth in the nation, headed into their rivalry against Penn State with a chance to play for a national championship. However, national tragedy struck on November 22 when President John F. Kennedy was assassinated which resulted in postponing Pitt's next-to-last game against Penn State from November 23 to December 7. The Panthers defeated the Miami Hurricanes on November 30, improving their record to 8–1. The bowls, which feared inviting Pitt before their season finale against Penn State the following week, signed other teams, leaving Pitt without a bowl invitation despite defeating the Nittany Lions, 22–21, and ending the season with a 9–1 record. Perceived as perhaps the best team of the modern football era not to appear in a bowl, the 1963 team finished with its number three ranking intact, but infamously received the label of the "No Bowl Team".

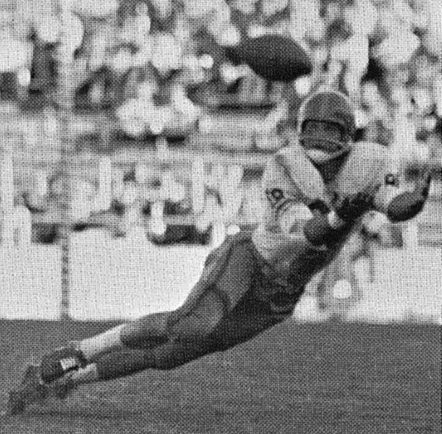
"Iron" Mike Ditka, shown here in 1960, was an All-American at left end and also played basketball and baseball

The bad luck of 1963 seemed to jinx the program for the rest of Michelosen tenure, and despite wins over Oklahoma, Miami, West Virginia, and Penn State, two three-win seasons followed. The losses prompted the removal of Michelosen as coach, a move that sent the football program into a tailspin.

In eleven seasons at Pitt, the second longest coaching tenure at the school after Sutherland's, Michelosen achieved a 56–49–7 record with only 4 losing campaigns. Pitt finished ranked among the top twenty programs in four seasons with Michelosen at the helm. Michelosen was a major coaching influence on such modern day NFL coaching greats as Mike Ditka and Marty Schottenheimer, both of whom played at Pitt under Michelosen.

=== Hart and DePasqua (1966–1972) ===
The years that followed Michelosen's tenure were among the most downtrodden years of Pitt football as the Panthers compiled a sickly 16–56 record over the next six seasons. David Hart, who replaced Michelosen, produced three straight one-win seasons where many games produced embarrassing scores (the average score during Hart's three years was 34–9). Hart was replaced in 1969 by Carl DePasqua, who had previously won a Division II national title as Waynesburg's coach and had been serving as an assistant coach for the Pittsburgh Steelers. DePasqua brought a handful of wins, including upsets over Syracuse, West Virginia, and at UCLA and produced the Panthers' first non-losing season in seven years, but could not achieve a winning record and was relieved following a disastrous single win campaign in 1972.

=== Johnny Majors and Jackie Sherrill (1973–1981) ===
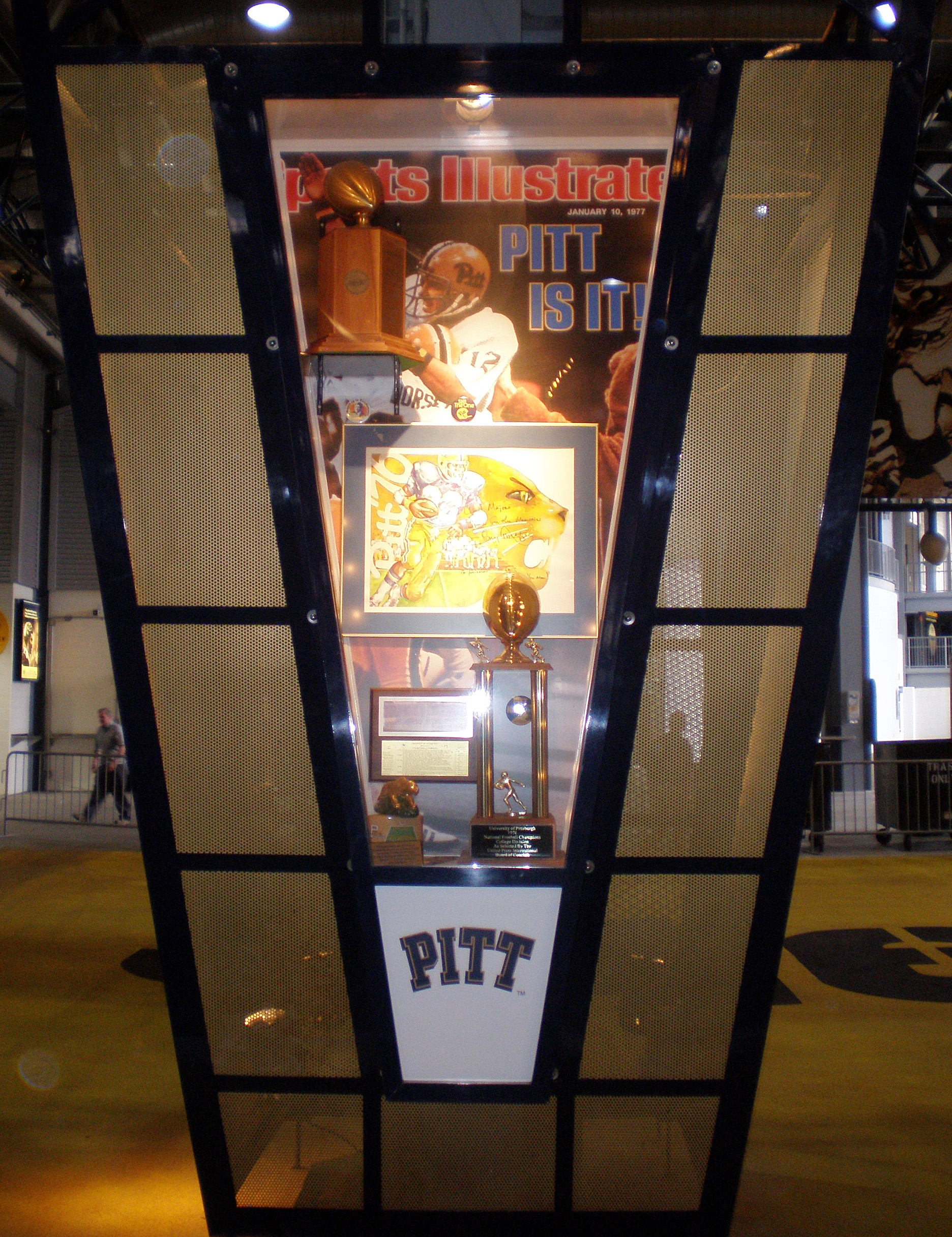
Heinz Field kiosk celebrating Pitt's 1976 National Championship

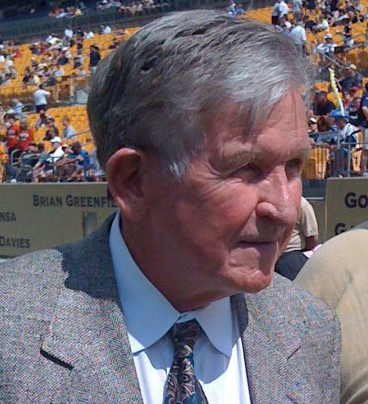
Johnny Majors

University Chancellor Wesley Posvar took action to revive the football program and hired Johnny Majors from Iowa State to resurrect the program in 1973. Majors immediately upgraded the recruiting, most notably bringing in future Heisman Trophy winner Tony Dorsett. Majors' impact was immediate: in Pitt's first game with Majors as coach, the Panthers travelled to the University of Georgia where they tied Vince Dooley's Bulldogs 7–7. The excitement in the city was palpable as the Panthers improved from one win in 1972 to a 6–5–1 record in 1973. Their success earned the Panthers their first bowl bid since 1956 when they were invited to play Arizona State in the 1973 Fiesta Bowl, where they lost 28–7. The next season saw further improvement with wins at Florida State and Georgia Tech to finish 7–4. In 1975, a Sun Bowl victory over Kansas capped an 8–4 record highlighted by wins at Georgia and against Notre Dame. The stage was thus set for the 1976 edition of the Panthers to make a run for the national championship.

The 1976 season began with the Panthers ranked ninth in the AP preseason poll. The first game was at Notre Dame, where the Irish grew the grass long on the playing field in a failed attempt to slow down Dorsett, who had burned them for 303 rushing yards the year before. Their efforts were in vain as Dorsett ran for a 61-yard gain on Pitt's first play from scrimmage on the way to a 31–10 win. The season continued with a 42–14 win at Georgia Tech and a 36–19 win over Miami. On October 23, the Panthers travelled to Annapolis to face Navy during which Dorsett broke the NCAA career rushing record on a 32-yard touchdown run in Pitt's 45–0 victory. Dorsett's achievement prompted a mid-game celebration in which even Navy saluted the feat with a cannon blast. Pitt next defeated eastern rival Syracuse 23–13, and on November 6, number two ranked Pitt easily handled Army while number one ranked Michigan lost to Purdue. For the first time since 1939, the Pitt Panthers were the number one ranked team in the country. The following week, they successfully defended their top rating in a close Backyard Brawl against rival West Virginia. With a record of 10–0, the Panthers headed into their regular season finale with only heated instate rival Penn State standing in the way of Pitt's national title aspirations. At a packed Three Rivers Stadium on the day after Thanksgiving, the Nittany Lions held Dorsett to 51 yards in the first half and had the game tied 7–7. Majors adjusted for the second half by shifting Dorsett from tailback to fullback, enabling him to explode for an additional 173 yards as Pitt rolled to a 24–7 victory that capped an undefeated regular season. In December, Dorsett became the first Pitt Panther to win the Heisman Trophy as the nation's best college football player. Dorsett also won the Maxwell Award, the Walter Camp Player of the Year Award, and was named UPI Player of the Year. The 11–0 Panthers accepted an invitation to the 1977 Sugar Bowl to face fourth ranked Georgia. Pitt defeated the Bulldogs 27–3 and was voted number one in both the final Associated Press and Coaches polls, claiming their ninth national championship. This was Pitt's first undefeated national championship since 1937. The American Football Coaches Association (AFCA) named Majors the 1976 Coach of the Year. Following this historic season, Majors returned to his alma mater, the University of Tennessee, to take the head coaching job.

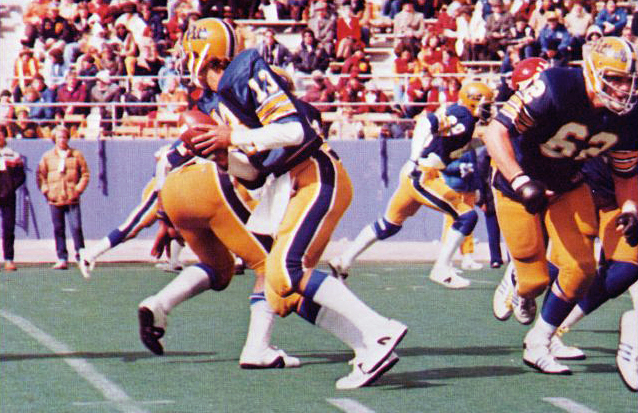
Dan Marino quarterbacks Pitt in a 1979 rout of Cincinnati in what would be the first of three straight 11–1 seasons

Jackie Sherrill, an assistant under Majors at Iowa State and Pitt and the head coach at Washington State, succeeded Majors as head coach at Pitt. Under Sherrill, the winning continued with a 9–2–1 record and Gator Bowl win in 1977. An 8–4 record and Tangerine Bowl appearance followed in 1978. Sherrill stockpiled future NFL talent including Pittsburgh's own quarterback Dan Marino, Hall of Fame inductee Russ Grimm, and Outland Trophy winner Mark May. Sherrill also molded a devastating defense that was anchored at the defensive end position manned by Hall of Fame inductee Rickey Jackson and Heisman Trophy runner-up Hugh Green, who had the highest finish in the Heisman voting by a defensive player until 1997, when Michigan's cornerback Charles Woodson, who also played receiver, won the trophy. 1979 began a string of three straight seasons with 11–1 records. However, an early loss at North Carolina in 1979, a midseason loss during a driving rainstorm at Florida State in 1980, and a devastating season-ending defeat at the hands of rival Penn State in 1981 prevented those teams from clinching an AP or Coaches poll national championship. The 1981 loss to Penn State at Pitt Stadium was especially devastating, as the number one ranked Panthers had opened up a 14–0 first-quarter lead only to see an apparent Dan Marino touchdown pass intercepted in the endzone. The Nittany Lions scored 48 unanswered points to end the Panthers' dream of a second national championship in five years. In each of these three seasons, Pitt rebounded to win a bowl game: the Fiesta, Gator, and Sugar Bowls respectively. The 1982 Sugar Bowl was highlighted by one of the most dramatic plays in Pitt history as Dan Marino hit a streaking John Brown on fourth down in the last seconds of the game for the go-ahead score against a Georgia team that featured Herschel Walker. Sherrill's teams at Pitt are considered by some to be among the most talented in Pitt and college football history. The 1980 Pitt team alone featured seven first round draft picks, 23 players who went on to start in the NFL, seven others who played in the NFL, and one player each who played in the CFL and the USFL. Bobby Bowden, legendary coach of Florida State, is quoted as saying, "I've said it many times, in all my years of coaching, that Pitt team was the best college football team I have ever seen." Sherrill left Pitt in early 1982 for Texas A&M, signing a then record contract worth over $1.7 million. In five seasons, Sherrill's Panthers won 50 games, lost nine, and tied one (50–9–1), which places his 0.842 winning percentage at the top of the list for all Pitt coaches, just ahead of Jock Sutherland.

=== Fazio, Gottfried, Hackett, and the return of Majors (1982–1996) ===
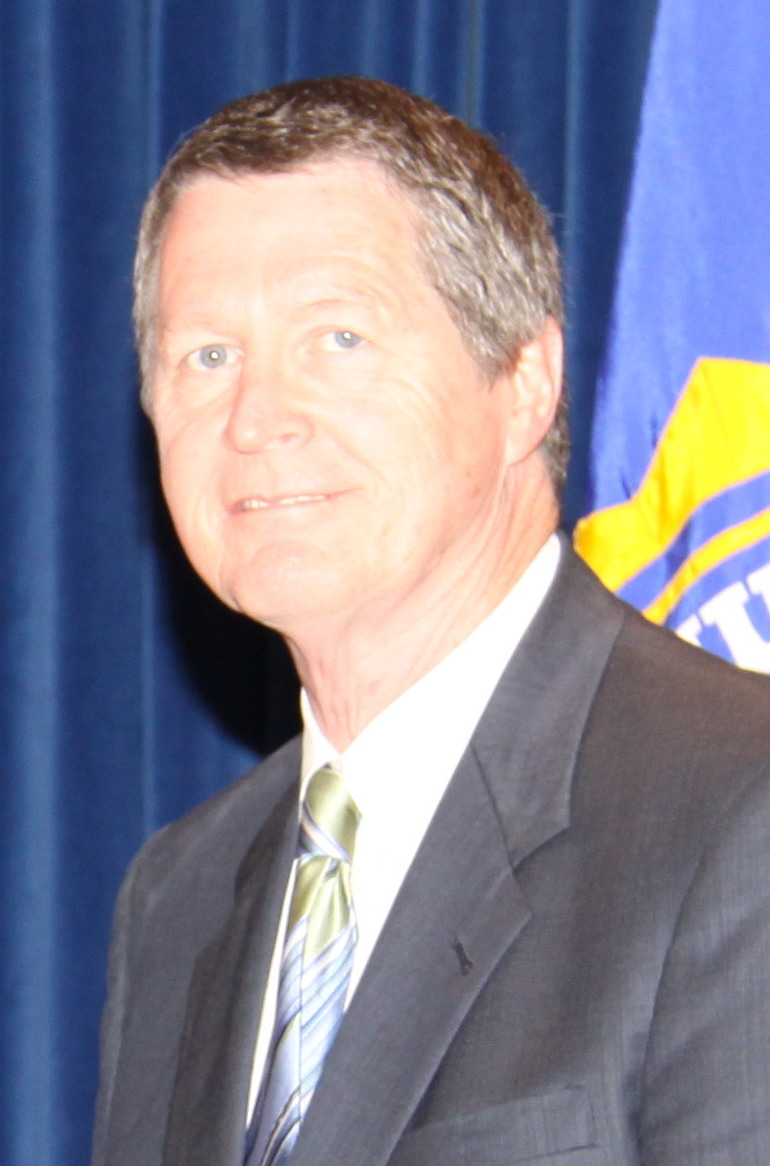
Mike Gottfried was Pitt's head coach from 1986 to 1989

Defensive coordinator and Pitt alumnus Foge Fazio took the reins of the preseason number one team for 1982. Expectations were high—dreams of a national championship seemed realistic. The loaded Panthers, in Marino's senior season, stormed out to a 7–0 record and number one ranking before losing to Notre Dame at Pitt Stadium. A season-ending loss at Penn State and a 1983 Cotton Bowl Classic loss to Southern Methodist left Pitt fans disappointed. National championship aspirations again failed to materialize in 1983 when Pitt fell to 8–3–1, including a loss to Ohio State in the 1984 Fiesta Bowl, despite inspired play from All-American offensive tackle Bill Fralic. A disastrous three-win season in 1984 was somewhat redeemed by a season-ending demolition of Penn State. However, a five-win season in 1985 prompted the school to relieve Fazio of his duties.

Mike Gottfried, who was previously Kansas' head football coach, recruited well, defeated rival Penn State twice, and led Pitt to the 1987 Astro-Bluebonnet Bowl and the 1989 John Hancock Bowl. Late in his tenure, the university's administration increased admissions standards for student-athletes to a level above those of its peer institutions and the NCAA. Gottfried fought these policy changes, which caused him to fall out of favor with the school's administration, including Chancellor Wesley Posvar. Additionally, Gottfried had poor relations with boosters, alumni and the media. As a result, Gottfried was fired after the 1989 season despite a 27–16–2 overall record.

Gottfried was replaced by his offensive coordinator, Paul Hackett, just prior to the 1989 John Hancock Bowl in which Pitt defeated Texas A&M. Under Hackett, the Panthers went 3–7–1 in 1990, improved to 6–5 in 1991 but fell to 3–8 in 1992, leading to his dismissal as head coach. Assistant coach and Pitt alumnus Sal Sunseri took over as interim head coach for the final contest at Hawai'i. With new academic policies in place, the football program underwent a steep decline. Hackett only posted one winning season. Hackett's overall record at Pitt is 13–20–1.

In 1991 Pitt joined the new Big East Football Conference, thus ending its history as a football independent. Pitt had been a member of the Big East in most other sports, including basketball, since 1982.

The university again looked to its past to reverse its fortunes and brought back Johnny Majors, who had recently resigned from Tennessee after a successful 16-year tenure there. However, recruiting had fallen off significantly under Hackett, and the quality of Pitt's football facilities had fallen behind those of its competition. Over the next four years, Majors tried to recreate the magic of the 1976 season but achieved little success. His final campaign in 1996 resulted in a 4–7 record which included several humiliating defeats. A new chancellor, Mark Nordenberg, brought in athletic director Steve Pederson in 1996 to resurrect the program. The move facilitated Majors' retirement from coaching following the 1996 season, although he continued to serve the university in the position of Special Assistant to the Athletic Director and Chancellor until the summer of 2007.

=== Walt Harris and Dave Wannstedt (1997–2010) ===
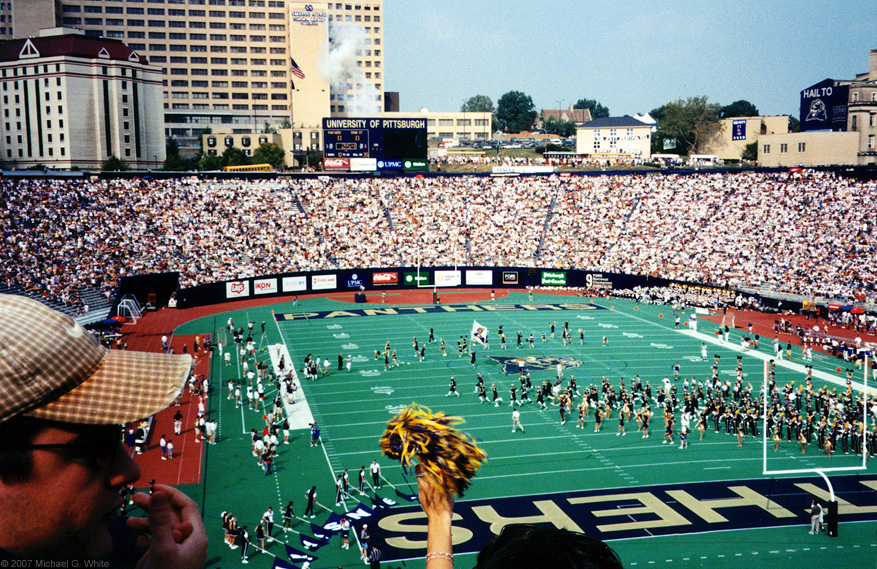
1998 game against Penn State at Pitt Stadium

The Pitt football program saw many changes instituted in 1997. New athletic director Steve Pederson moved to revamp the athletic department after the preceding years had wounded the program's image. A controversial emphasis on the use of the full name "Pittsburgh", at the expense of the university's abbreviated moniker "Pitt", along with new logos designed to invoke the heritage of the steel industry in the region, were instituted in an attempt to tie the school more closely to the image of the city. New shades of blue and gold were introduced and the athletic booster club was overhauled. Walt Harris, who had built a reputation as a quarterback guru with a background in the West Coast Offense, was brought in to replace Majors in 1997 and undertook the task of rebuilding a program that won only fifteen games in the previous five seasons. Results were almost immediate as Harris took Pitt to the 1997 Liberty Bowl in his first season, finishing with a 6–6 record. Over the next two seasons, the Panthers posted a losing record as Harris worked on enhancing the talent in Pitt's program. At the same time, the university administration decided to bring the football program's deteriorating facilities in line with those of Pitt's peers. A state-of-the art practice facility, the UPMC Sports Performance Complex, was constructed on the city's South Side in collaboration with the University of Pittsburgh Medical Center. In lieu of much-needed but cost-prohibitive renovations to modernize Pitt Stadium, the administration made a controversial decision to move home games to the newly proposed North Shore stadium, later named Heinz Field, and to demolish Pitt Stadium in order to build a long-awaited convocation center on its footprint. 1999 was the final season for the Panthers in Pitt Stadium, which had served Pitt for 75 seasons. On November 13, 1999, the Panthers upset Notre Dame 37–27 in the last game played at the stadium. Although the Panthers showed improvement during the 1999 season, their loss in the season finale at West Virginia left them with a 5–6 record and without a bowl.

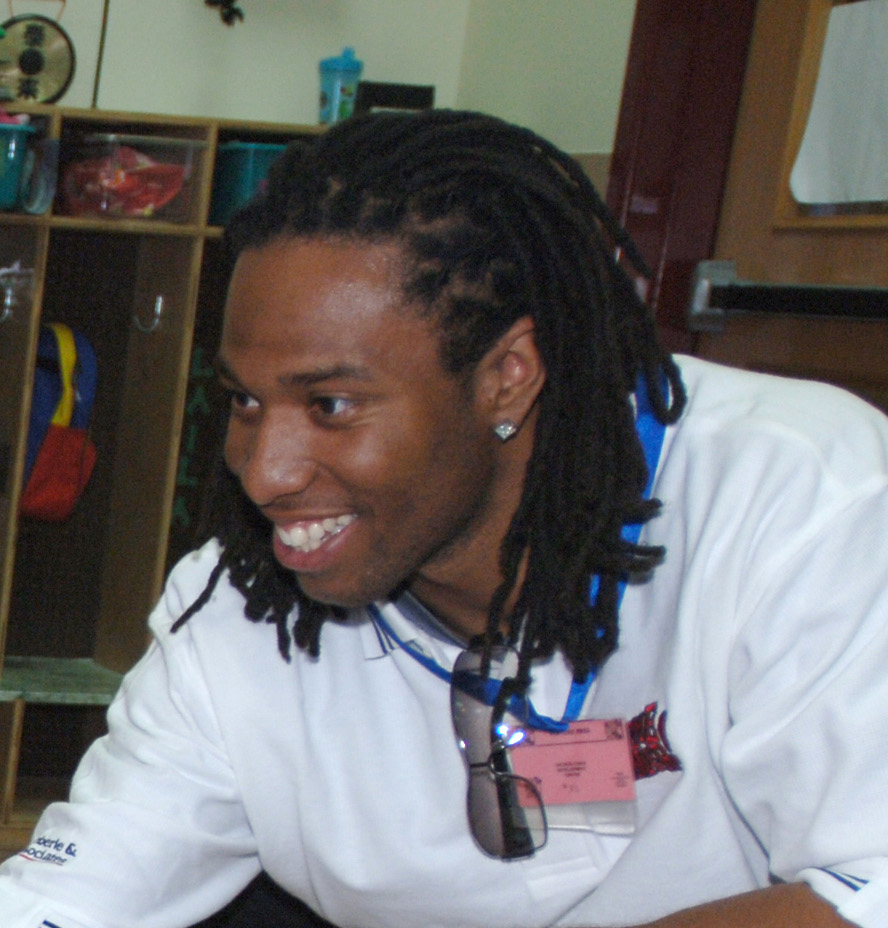
Larry Fitzgerald won the Biletnikoff and Walter Camp awards, was the Heisman Trophy runner-up, and was featured on the cover of EA Sports NCAA Football 2005 following his 2003 season with Pitt.

Pitt played its home games in 2000 at Three Rivers Stadium. Behind an increasing number of talented players, led by Biletnikoff Award winner Antonio Bryant, Pitt was back to a winning record in 2000 and played Iowa State in the 2000 Insight.com Bowl. In the second game of the 2000 season, Pitt defeated rival Penn State 12–0 which was the last game played between these two teams for 16 years. In 2001, Pitt began playing its home games at Heinz Field. Additional bowl games and national rankings followed over the next four seasons. Overall Harris led the Panthers to a bowl game in six of his eight seasons, including five consecutive bowl games from 2000 through 2004, with bowl victories in the 2001 Tangerine Bowl over North Carolina State in 2001 and, led by Biletnikoff and Walter Camp Award winner Larry Fitzgerald, over Oregon State in the 2002 Insight Bowl. Harris also led Pittsburgh to a share of the Big East Conference championship in 2004 and Pitt received the conference's automatic Bowl Championship Series (BCS) bowl bid, playing Utah in the 2005 Fiesta Bowl. Harris was named the Big East Conference Coach of the Year in 1997 and 2004, and he was the AFCA Region I Coach of the Year in 2002. Over his eight years at Pitt, from 1997–2004, Harris compiled an overall record of 52–44. However, alumni and fans were growing restless with perceived recruiting deficiencies and an inability to return the program to the highest level. When disparaging remarks about the program were made by his agent, Harris' contract negotiations with the school stalled. This led to an announcement prior to the Fiesta Bowl in 2004 that Harris was leaving Pitt to become head coach at Stanford.

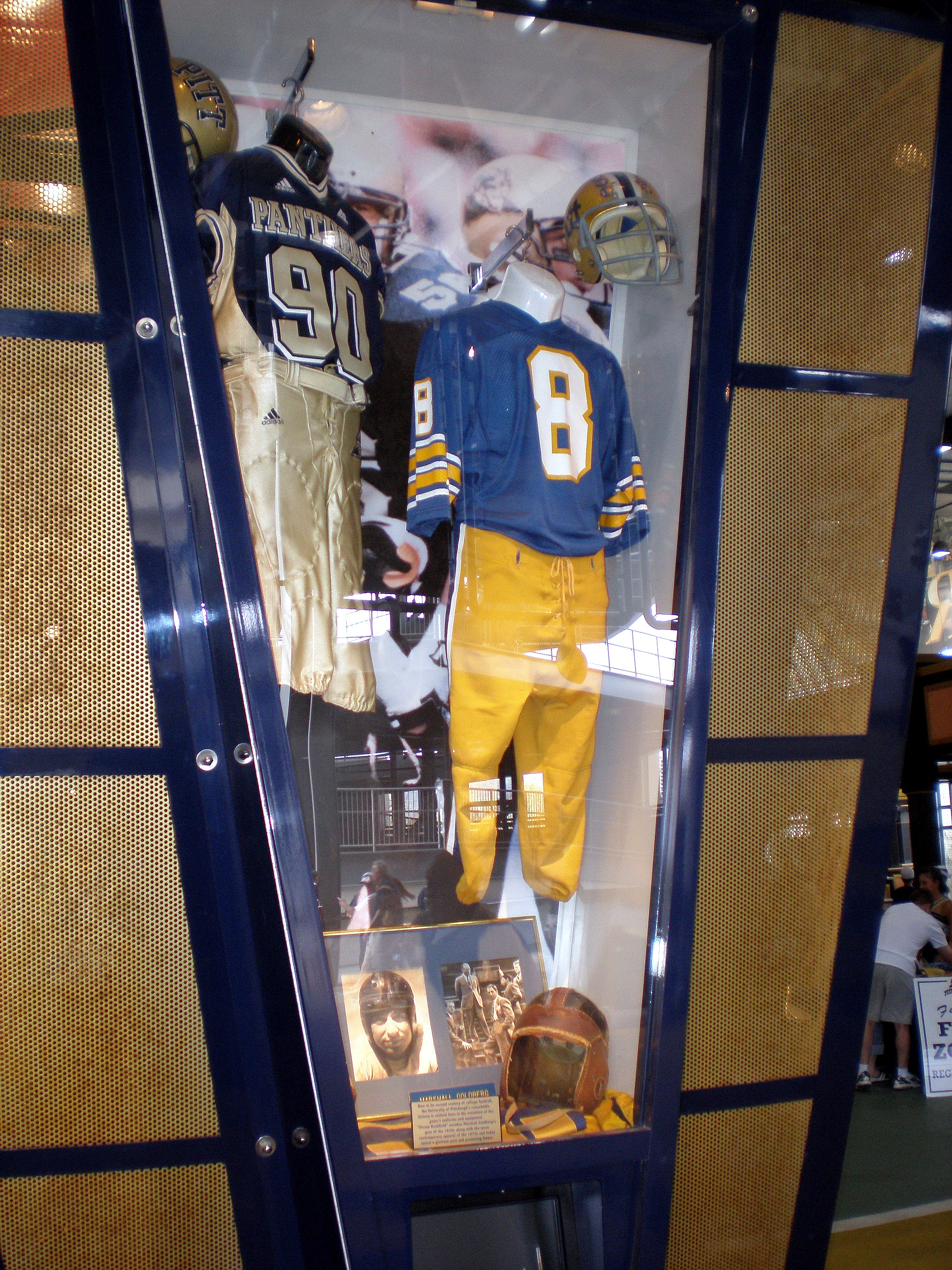
Uniform from 2005 season (left) and the era from 1973–96 (right) on display at Heinz Field

Dave Wannstedt, a Pittsburgh area native and former Pitt player, graduate, and graduate assistant coach (1975–78), who had recently resigned as head coach of the NFL's Miami Dolphins, succeeded Harris as Pitt's head coach on December 23, 2004. Wannstedt's return to his alma mater was marked by a return to the use of the wordmark "Pitt" as a logo, including its display on the football helmets.

Known for his prowess in college recruiting when an assistant to Jimmy Johnson, Wannstedt reeled in classes that were nationally ranked throughout his tenure at Pitt. However, little improvement was seen at first in the record column as Pitt struggled with a 5–6 and 6–6 record in his first two seasons. The 2007 season featured several close losses, but the team showed signs of improvement on the way to a 4–6 record prior to the last game of the season at number two ranked West Virginia. The game in Morgantown on December 1, 2007, was the 100th Backyard Brawl, and would prove to be one of the greatest of the series. The four touchdown favorite Mountaineers needed only a win over archrival Pitt to earn a spot in the BCS National Championship Game. However, Wannstedt earned his signature victory and marked a turning point for the program with perhaps the biggest upset in both schools' histories when Pitt defeated West Virginia 13–9 and thus prevented the Mountaineers from playing for the national championship.

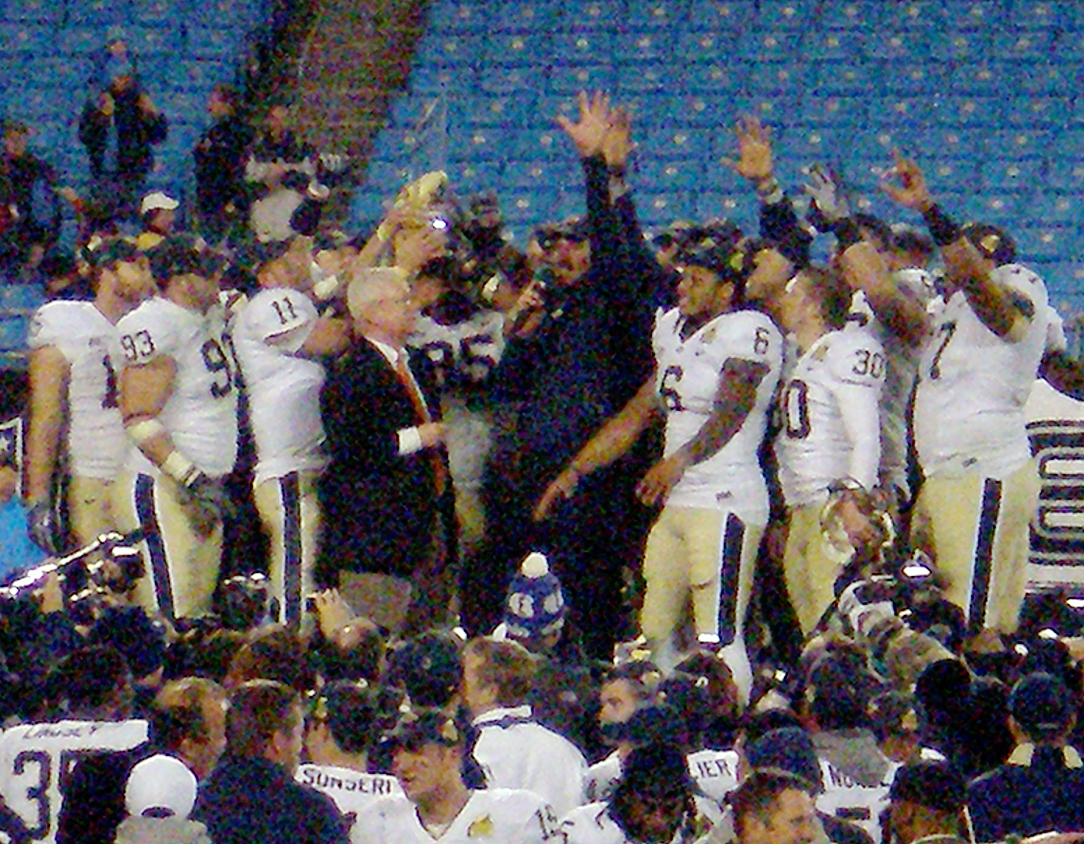
Dave Wannstedt addresses the crowd during the trophy presentation following the 2009 Meineke Car Care Bowl, in which Pitt defeated North Carolina 19–17

The following season, Pitt recorded key victories against Iowa, tenth ranked South Florida, West Virginia, and a 36–33 four-overtime thriller at Notre Dame, the longest game ever for both Notre Dame and Pittsburgh. A close defeat in the River City Rivalry against Cincinnati cost Pitt a conference championship, but the Panthers played in the Sun Bowl, its first bowl bid under Wannstedt, and finished with a 9–3 record. In 2009, Pitt shot off to a 9–1 start, its best start since 1982, with impressive wins over Navy, Notre Dame, and Rutgers, and had climbed to ninth in the AP and BCS polls. However, Pitt lost its final two regular season games, including a last second loss by a field goal at West Virginia and a one-point loss at home for the Big East championship to undefeated Cincinnati. The Panthers rebounded by winning the Meineke Car Care Bowl over North Carolina, 19–17, to finish ranked 15th and achieve its first ten-win season since 1981. In addition, Pitt players garnered many post-season accolades, including Big East Offensive Player and Rookie of the Year in Dion Lewis, and Big East Co-Defensive Players of the Year in Mick Williams and Greg Romeus.

Prior to the 2010 season, Pitt was selected as the preseason favorite to win the Big East and was ranked 15th in the preseason polls. However, Pitt stumbled out of the gate with an overtime loss at Utah and dropped out of the polls for the remainder of the season. Although they claimed a share of the Big East championship (along with Connecticut and West Virginia), Pitt ended the regular season with a disappointing 7–5 record and an invitation to the BBVA Compass Bowl. This prompted Dave Wannstedt's resignation as head coach on December 7, 2010, with defensive coordinator Phil Bennett taking over for the bowl game.

=== Haywood, Graham, and Chryst (2010–2014) ===
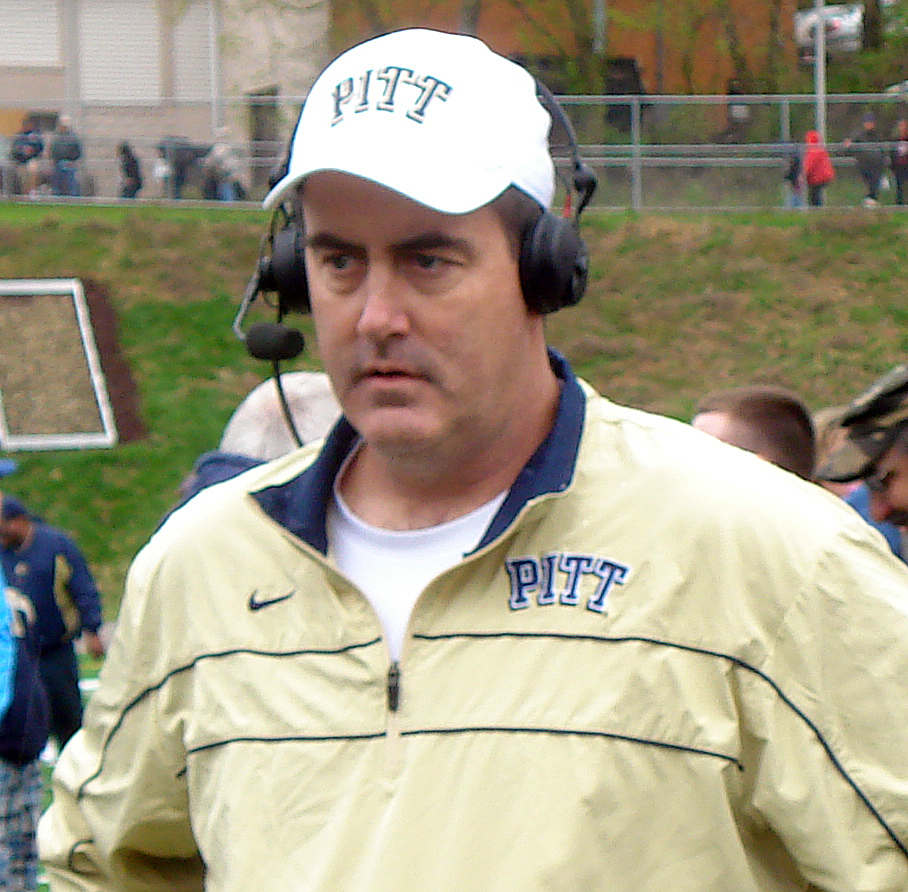
Coach Chryst

On December 16, 2010, Miami (OH) head coach Mike Haywood was introduced as Wannstedt's replacement as head coach. At his introductory press conference, athletic director Steve Pederson said Haywood was "a man of integrity and character and will be a true inspirational leader for our football team." However, Haywood's arrest on domestic violence charges in South Bend, Indiana on December 31, two weeks and two days later, prompted Pitt to fire him immediately. Haywood never coached a game, recruited a player, led a practice or even hired an assistant coach at Pitt. His 16-day tenure at Pitt is the second shortest in FBS history (only to George O'Leary's five-day tenure at Notre Dame). Despite the turmoil, Bennett led the Panthers to a 27–10 bowl victory over Kentucky on January 8, 2011.

Following the bowl win, Pitt announced Tulsa head coach Todd Graham as the new head coach of the Panthers. At his introductory press conference, Graham talked about how Pitt was a "dream come true" and that he would work hard every day to "gain everyone's trust" and that he would coach his players to do the same. Graham instituted a sweeping change of offensive and defensive philosophies but staggered to a 6–6 regular season. However, major news for the university was announced in September of that season when Pitt accepted an invitation to join the Atlantic Coast Conference effective July 1, 2013. On December 14, 2011, less than one year after being hired, Graham shocked Pitt when he resigned to take the head coaching position at Arizona State. Defensive coordinator Keith Patterson was named as the interim head coach for the BBVA Compass Bowl, which the Panthers lost to Southern Methodist by a score of 28–6.

On December 22, 2011, Wisconsin offensive coordinator Paul Chryst was introduced as the head coach and lead the Panthers in their final season of the Big East which included another appearance in the BBVA Compass Bowl and a 6–7 final record. Chryst's hiring made him the Panthers' fourth head football coach since December 2010 (sixth counting interims).

Chryst led Pitt into the Atlantic Coast Conference where the program competed in the conference's Coastal Division during the 2013 season. The Panthers again posted a 6–6 record in the 2013 regular season and accepted an invitation to the Little Caesars Pizza Bowl, where they defeated Bowling Green 30–27. On December 17, 2014, Chryst was announced as the new head coach at Wisconsin; athletic director Steve Pederson was fired on the same day as Chryst's departure. On December 17, 2014 Joe Rudolph was named interim coach for the Armed Forces Bowl against the University of Houston.

=== Pat Narduzzi era (2015–present) ===
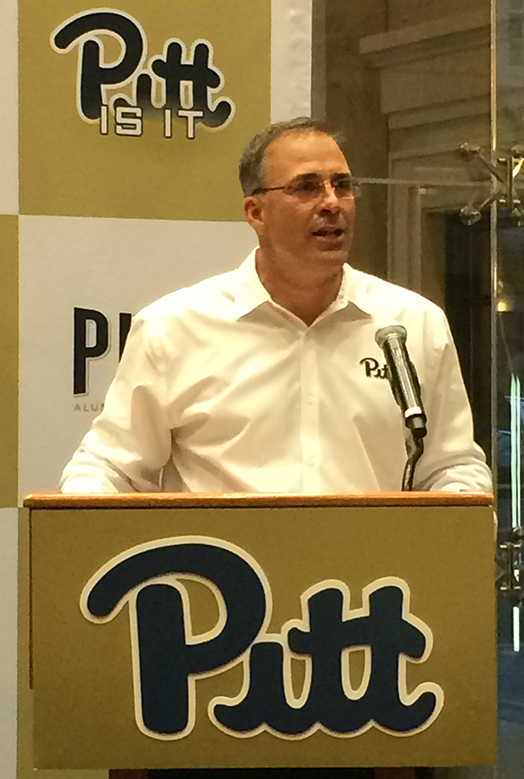
Coach Narduzzi

On December 26, 2014; Michigan State defensive coordinator Pat Narduzzi was named the 37th Pitt head coach. Although he did not have any head coaching experience, Narduzzi was regarded as one of the country's best defensive minds and assistant coaches who had recruiting strong ties to the northern United States and, specifically, east Ohio and west Pennsylvania. Pittsburgh signed Narduzzi to a five-year contract.

Pitt went 8–5 in 2015. The Panthers began the Narduzzi era on September 5 with a 45–37 victory over FCS opponent Youngstown State. Pittsburgh won their second game of the season the following week, defeating Akron by a score of 24–7. After a 27–24 loss to Iowa, Narduzzi's squad defeated Virginia Tech by a margin of 17–13. In the season's fifth game, the Panthers defeated Virginia by a score of 26–19. A third straight win came on October 17 with a 31–28 victory over Georgia Tech. After a 23–20 victory over Syracuse, Pittsburgh suffered its second defeat of the season with a 26–19 loss to North Carolina. On November 7, Narduzzi's Panthers lost to No. 8 Notre Dame by a score of 42–30. That was followed by a 31–13 victory over Duke. After a 45–34 victory over Louisville, Pitt fell to Miami in the regular season finale by a score of 29–24. The Panthers accepted an invitation to the Military Bowl, where they lost to No. 21 Navy by a margin of 44–28. During the 2015 season, Pitt was ranked in the AP top 25 for the first time since 2010. Narduzzi's first full recruiting class, in 2016, was ranked 30th in the country, Pitt's highest ranked class since 2008. On December 10, 2015; Pitt signed Narduzzi to a two-year contract extension and raised his pay.

The Panthers finished with another 8–5 record in 2016. In the season opener, they defeated in-state FCS opponent Villanova by a score of 28–7. After a 42–39 victory over archrival Penn State, Pittsburgh suffered their first loss of the season, dropping a 45–38 contest to Oklahoma State. After a nailbiting 37–36 loss to North Carolina, Narduzzi's team won a 43–27 contest over Marshall on October 1. A second straight win followed one week later when the Panthers defeated Georgia Tech by a margin of 37–34. Narduzzi's squad won a third straight game On October 15 when they defeated Virginia by a score of 45–31. Pittsburgh then suffered consecutive defeats, falling to No. 25 Virginia Tech by a margin of 39–36 and Miami by a score of 51–28. On November 12, the Panthers traveled to Clemson, South Carolina and knocked off No. 3 Clemson by a score of 43–42 on a late field goal. Pitt followed that huge upset victory with a 56–14 blowout win over Duke and a high-scoring 76–61 shootout victory over Syracuse to finish the regular season. Pittsburgh accepted an invitation to the Pinstripe Bowl, a game they lost to Northwestern by a score of 31–24.

Pittsburgh slipped to a 5–7 record in 2017. The Panthers kicked off the season on September 2, defeating FCS Youngstown State in overtime by a score of 28–21. One week later, Pitt lost the Keystone Classic to archrival No. 4 Penn State by a margin of 33–14. In the season's third game, Narduzzi's squad lost its second straight contest with a 59–21 defeat at the hands of No. 9 Oklahoma State. After a 42–10 victory over Rice, the Panthers lost another two straight; falling to Syracuse by a margin of 27–24 and No. 20 NC State by a score of 35–17. Pitt then won their next two; defeating Duke by a margin of 24–17 and Virginia by a score of 31–14. After a 34–31 loss to North Carolina and a 20–14 defeat to No. 17 Virginia Tech knocked the Panthers out of bowl contention, Narduzzi's team finished the season with a big upset victory, stunning No. 2 Miami by a score of 24–14. On December 6, 2017, the University of Pittsburgh administration signed Narduzzi to another contract extension and raise, extending his deal by seven years. Narduzzi led Pitt to its first ACC Coastal Division Championship in 2018.

In 2021, Narduzzi led Pitt to a 10–2 regular season and the ACC Coastal Division title. The Panthers faced Wake Forest in the 2021 ACC Championship Game, where they won 45–21, leading to Pitt's first ACC conference title (as well as their first conference title since 2010). They were invited to the Peach Bowl in 2021, where they lost to Michigan State by a score of 31–21.
