= Gabbard (surname) =

Gabbard is a surname. Notable people with the surname include:

- Caroline Sinavaiana-Gabbard (1946–2024), American Samoan academic, writer, poet, and environmentalist
- Doug Gabbard II (fl. 2005–2011), American judge in Oklahoma
- Glen Gabbard (born 1949), American psychiatrist
- Kason Gabbard (born 1982), American baseball coach and former pitcher
- Mike Gabbard (born 1948), American politician in Hawaii, father of Tulsi and brother of Caroline
- Steve Gabbard (born 1966), American football player
- Tulsi Gabbard (born 1981), American politician and military officer, former Director of National Intelligence

== See also ==
- Gabbard (disambiguation)
- Gabbert
- Gibbard
