= Fanny Osborne =

New Zealand botanical artist (1852–1934)

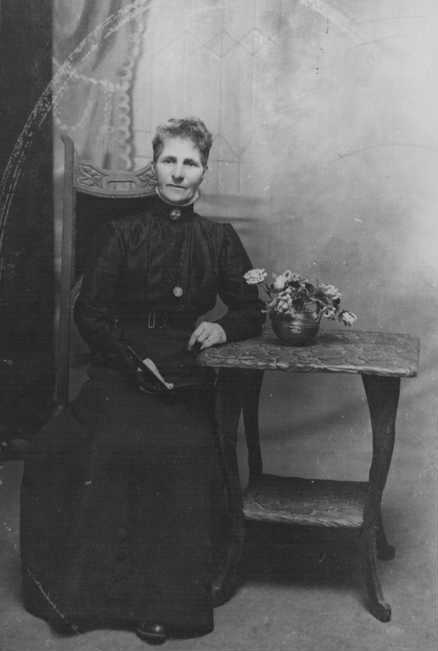
- Osborne in 1912
- Born: Fanny Malcolm; 29 January 1852; Auckland, New Zealand
- Died: 12 March 1934 (aged 82); Auckland, New Zealand
- Resting place: Great Barrier Island
- Known for: Botanical illustration

Fanny Osborne (née Malcolm, 29 January 1852 – 12 March 1934) was a New Zealand botanical illustrator. She was born in Auckland in 1852. A collection of her paintings of Great Barrier Island plants was published in 1983.

== Early life ==
Osborne was born in Auckland, on 29 January 1852, the second child of thirteen born, to Neill Malcolm and Emilie Malcolm. Neill had been a barrister at the Inner Temple, London, but lost his inheritance due to a poor decision by a trustee, and gave up his law career. Malcolm married Emilie Monson Wilton, the daughter of a retired army colonel in 1848, and they emigrated to New Zealand two years later, arriving on the SS Victory in February 1850.

At age six, Osborne moved with her parents and three sisters to Great Barrier Island, about 90 km (56 mi) to the north-east of Auckland. Osborne's parents began cattle farming at Tryphena in the south of the island, in partnership with another settler, Robert Barstow. Barstow took a position as magistrate on the mainland three months after the Malcolms arrived, leaving them as the only European settlers in Tryphena. The farm was dilapidated, the cattle had to be re-domesticated, and Emilie had a further nine children to look after. Growing up in such an isolated location was challenging, but Osborne's mother Emilie recognised artistic talents in her daughter at an early stage, and ordered art materials from Auckland. The Malcolms had difficulty proving title to the farm, despite repeatedly attempting to get the farm surveyed. When twenty new settlers arrived in Tryphena in 1867, the Malcolms were forced to pay £56 for a reduced lot of 80 acres, which rankled as the new settlers received government grants of land without fees. Emilie Malcolm refused to socialise with the new neighbours, and was especially bitter towards Alfred Joe Osborne, who came to live on land in Tryphena that the Malcolms had previously considered part of their farm. Osborne's father, a wool trader in Auckland, had purchased the land.

In 1874, Fanny Malcolm, aged 21, eloped with the 26-year-old AJ Osborne after a three-year secret relationship; they were married 15 January 1874 by Bishop Cowie at Bishopscourt in Parnell. The witnesses to the marriage were Joe's parents, Joseph and Mary Osborne. She was the first of her siblings to marry. Joe and Fanny returned to settle at Mulberry Grove in Tryphena in the same bay as Fanny's parents farm and commenced raising a family of 13 children. Fanny's parents would not approve the match, and it is said that Osborne was estranged from her mother from then on. In 1884 Alfred Osborne became the first teacher at a school in Tryphena. He was well-educated, having studied music and languages for four years in Berlin.

== Career ==
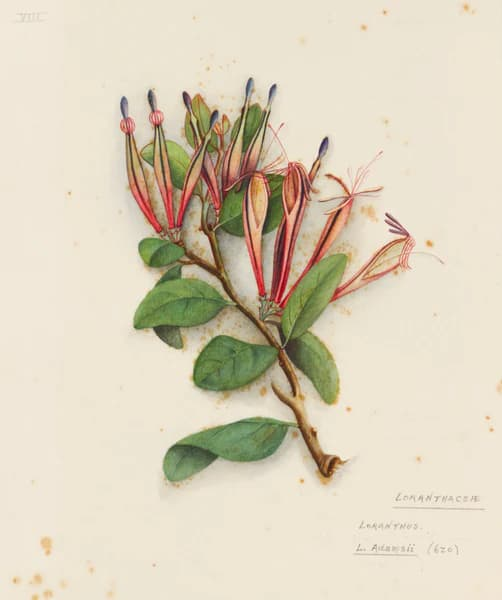
Osborne's painting of the now extinct, monotypic Trilepidea adamsii (Adams mistletoe)

As Osborne did not date her paintings it is not known when she commenced painting the indigenous plants of Great Barrier Island. However, over a period of some decades her work reached the highest quality and is now greatly appreciated from both artistic and scientific points of view. Osborne started to produce sets of paintings of native flowers before 1900, but was most creative from 1911 to 1916. By the 1920s, her renown had grown, and she was visited twice by the Governor-General's wife Lady Alice Fergusson, who sketched the Osborne home and garden, and purchased a set of Osborne's paintings.

Her paintings of the Adams mistletoe (Trilepidea adamsii) are particularly important as this species is now considered extinct, and no colour photographs of it exist. A collection of her paintings of Great Barrier Island plants was published in 1983 by Jeanne Goulding of the Auckland Museum, whose botany department holds the largest collection of Osborne's works.

== Death ==
Osborne was widowed on 9 January 1920, aged 82, in Auckland. Towards end of her life she was crippled with arthritis, and moved to the mainland to live with her daughters Constance and Winifred only reluctantly, when she was aged 77. Osborne died in Auckland on 12 March 1934 and is buried on Great Barrier Island. Osborne had 13 children. Her daughter Lilian Gibbard became a noted painter of wildflowers. Son Charles Osborne was a naturalist and conchologist, and kept a shell museum. Son Cedric Osborne was known for his skill with inlaid wood, and created two panels depicting native flowers, which were presented to the Princess Elizabeth and the Duke of Edinburgh as a wedding present from the people of New Zealand.
