= Georgina Hetley =

New Zealand artist and author

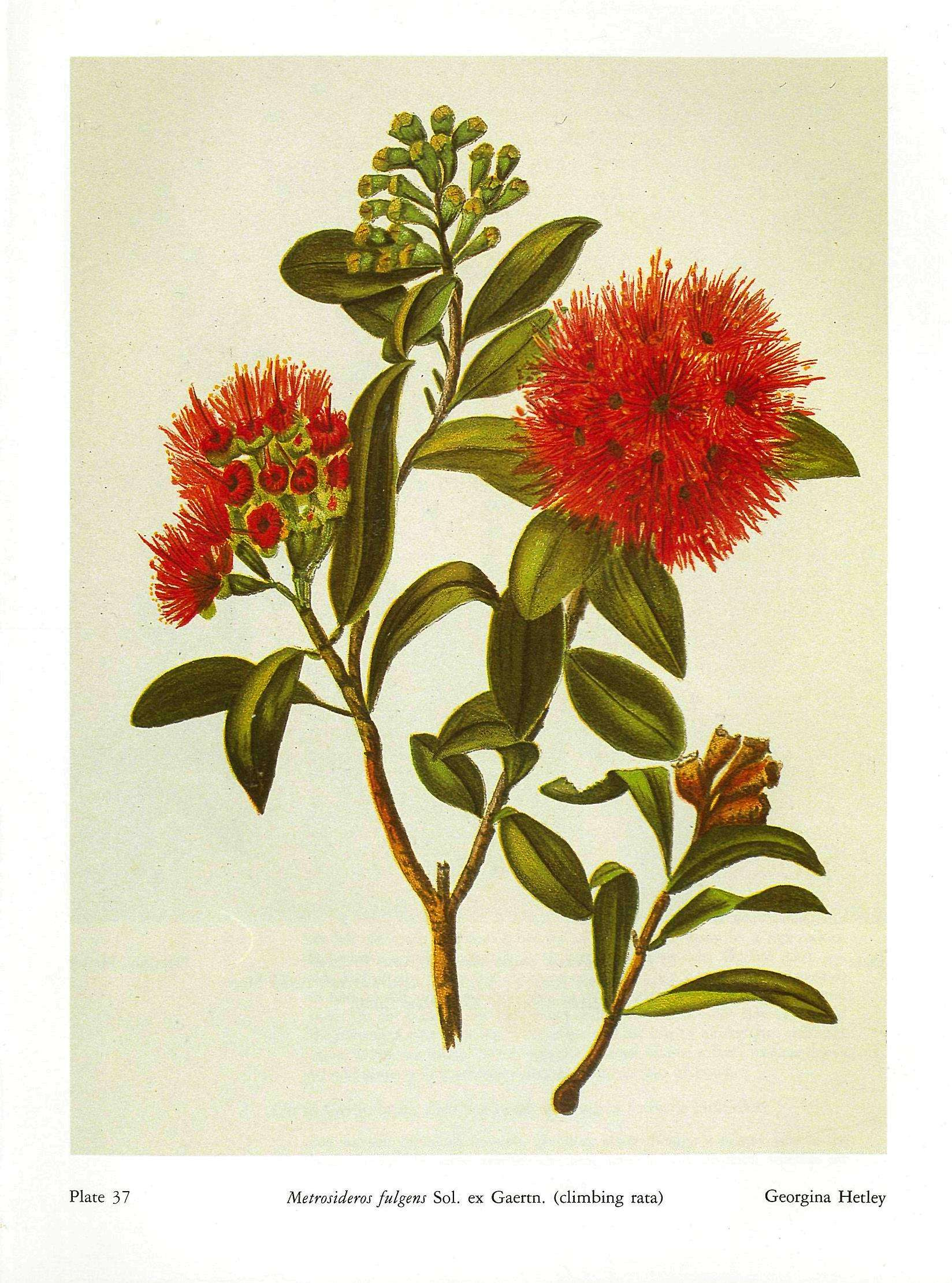
Painting of Metrosideros fulgens by Georgina Burne Hetley

Georgina Burne Hetley (née McKellar, 27 May 1832 – 29 August 1898) was a New Zealand artist and writer. Her book The Native Flora of New Zealand was published in English and French.

== Early life ==
Hetley was born in Battersea, Surrey, England on 27 May 1832. She was the second daughter of ten children of Annette and Dugald McKellar, a doctor. The family moved to Madeira, Portugal when Hetley was around 10 years old, leaving in 1852 for New Zealand when her father died. Annette McKellar, her children and two servants arrived in New Plymouth on the St Michael in December 1853. Annette McKellar bought a block of about fifty acres of land at Omata, six miles south of New Plymouth. She called their farm Fernlea. Hetley subsequently married a fellow settler Charles Hetley in the Omata church on 2 June 1856 and moved to Brookwood farm. Just prior to their first wedding anniversary Charles died, leaving Hetley with a newborn son, Charles Frederick Hetley. This led to Hetley selling her farm two years later and returning to Fernlea to live with her mother.

Hetley lived in Taranaki until 1860 when the First Taranaki War broke out. The conflict led to Annette McKellar moving her family to New Plymouth. Fernlea was burnt down in the ensuing conflict, although the family rebuilt it later. While in Taranaki, Hetley began drawing sketches and watercolours of the farm and surrounding landscapes. She continued this practice after the move to New Plymouth, painting the urban scenes in New Plymouth, Waikato and Auckland. Between 1863 and the late 1870s, she travelled to Queensland and sketched local stations. She and her son moved to Auckland by 1879.

== Exhibitions and publications ==
In 1879, Hetley exhibited with the Auckland Society of Artists. In 1885 she won first prize at the New Zealand Industrial Exhibition in Wellington for her paintings of indigenous plants. Following a lecture about a botanical trip to Nelson given by Thomas Frederic Cheeseman at the Auckland Museum in 1881—and with considerable encouragement from him—Hetley was inspired to write a comprehensive guide to New Zealand flora. This would be following in the style of Dr Walter Buller's book on New Zealand birds that had been published in 1873. By 1884, she had started work on a book of native plants, The Native Flowers of New Zealand Illustrated in Colours, embarking (with the backing from the government and the Union Steamship Company) on a trip around New Zealand to obtain live specimens. She collected plants from the North Island and travelled to the South Island to collect specimens from Nelson, Greymouth and Arthur's Pass. She spent six weeks in Christchurch, sketching the plants in their botanical gardens which came from places she was unable to travel to. This included Stewart Island and the Chatham Islands.

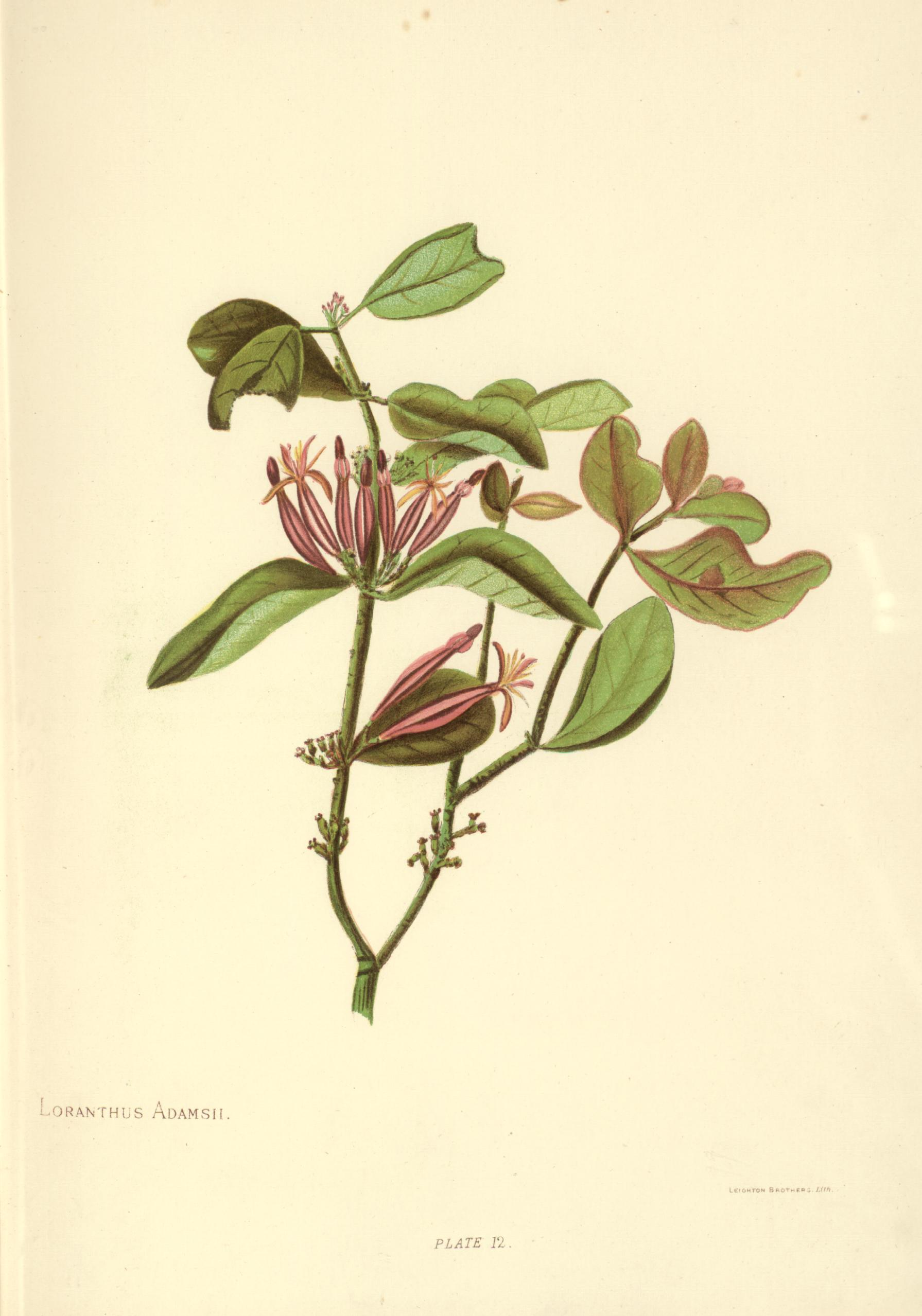
Trilepidea adamsii (previously known as Loranthus adamsii) by Georgina Burne Hetley.

Hetley went to England to seek a publisher, receiving assistance along the way from authorities at Kew, and the chromolithographs were ultimately produced in 1888 by Leighton Brothers. The plates also had the distinction of being published in a French edition a year later. The inclusion in the book of Loranthus adamsii is notable as this native mistletoe was discovered by Mr James Adams of the Thames goldfields shortly before it became extinct. Without the work of botanical artists such as Hetley there would be no record of what this plant truly looked like. While in London, her work was exhibited at the Colonial and Indian Exhibition.

Hetley returned to New Zealand in 1889 and exhibited her New Zealand flora at the General Assembly Library in Wellington. She also held another major exhibit, 150 paintings in all, at Auckland Museum. Hetley lived in Auckland for the rest of her life, dying there after a long illness, on 29 August 1898.

In 2017, Hetley was selected as one of the Royal Society Te Apārangi's "150 women in 150 words", celebrating the contributions of women to knowledge in New Zealand.
