= Gibbard =

Gibbard is a surname. Notable people with the surname include:

- Allan Gibbard (born 1942), American philosopher
- Alun Gibbard (1960–2025), Welsh author and broadcaster
- Ben Gibbard (born 1976), American musician
- John Gibbard, furniture manufacturer
- Les Gibbard (1945–2010), political cartoonist, journalist, illustrator
- Lilian Gibbard (1877–1977), New Zealand artist
- Phil Gibbard (born 1949), Professor of Quaternary Palaeoenvironments

== See also ==
- Gibbard's theorem
- Gibbard–Satterthwaite theorem
