= Fitzgerald Field House =

Sports venue in Pennsylvania, United States

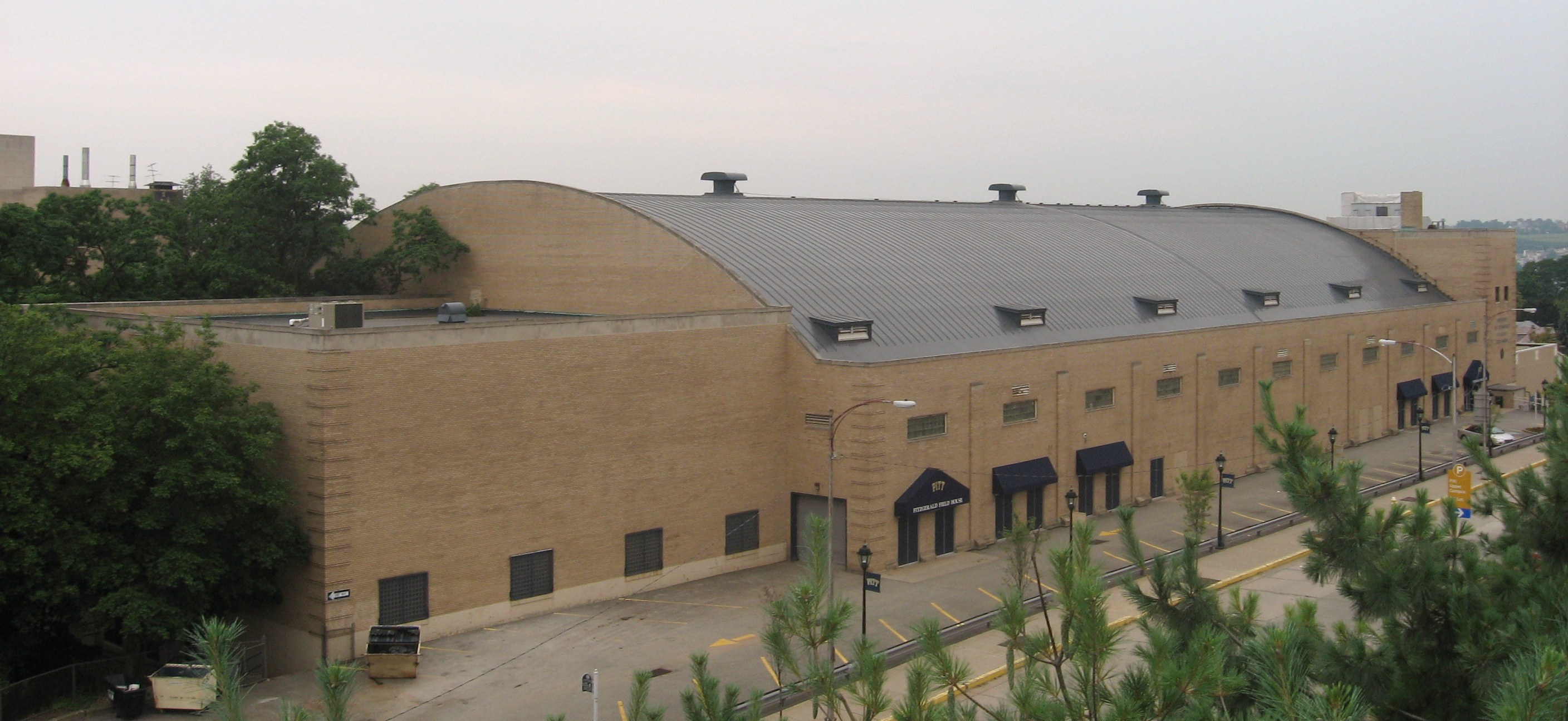

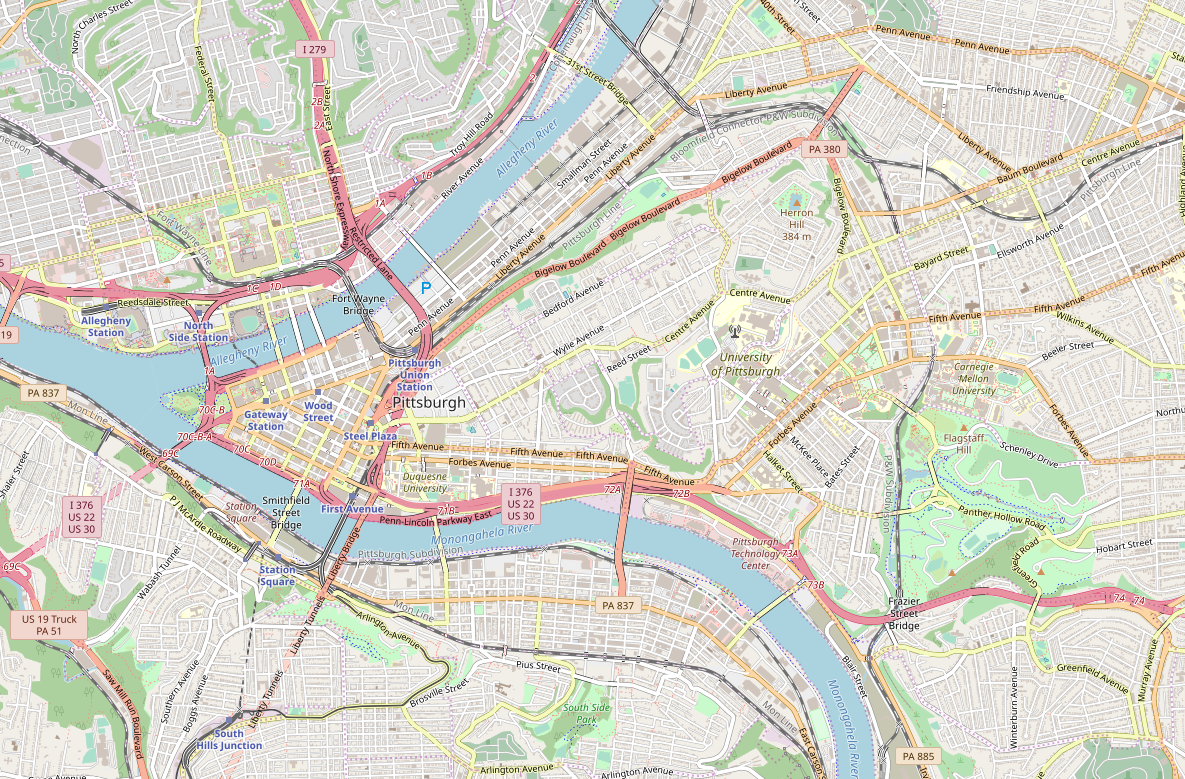
- Location near Downtown Pittsburgh Location in Pennsylvania Location in the United States
- Location: Allequippa St & Darragh St Pittsburgh, PA 15261
- Coordinates: 40°26′37″N 79°57′51″W
- Owner: University of Pittsburgh
- Operator: University of Pittsburgh
- Capacity: 5,200 (1951–ca. 1976); 5,308 (ca. 1977–1980); 6,360 (1980–ca. 1984); 6,798 (1985–2002); 4,122 (2007–present)

Construction
- Opened: December 15, 1951

Tenants
- formerly Pittsburgh Panthers (volleyball, wrestling, gymnastics, & indoor track)(1982–2026) men's basketball (1951–2002); Duquesne Dukes men's basketball (1956–1964)

Fitzgerald Field House is a 4,122-seat multi-purpose athletic venue on the campus of the University of Pittsburgh in Pittsburgh, Pennsylvania, United States. Fitzgerald Field House is named for Rufus Fitzgerald, a past chancellor of the university (1945–1955). It was the primary home competition venue for the university's gymnastics, volleyball, and wrestling teams until 2026.

== Usage ==
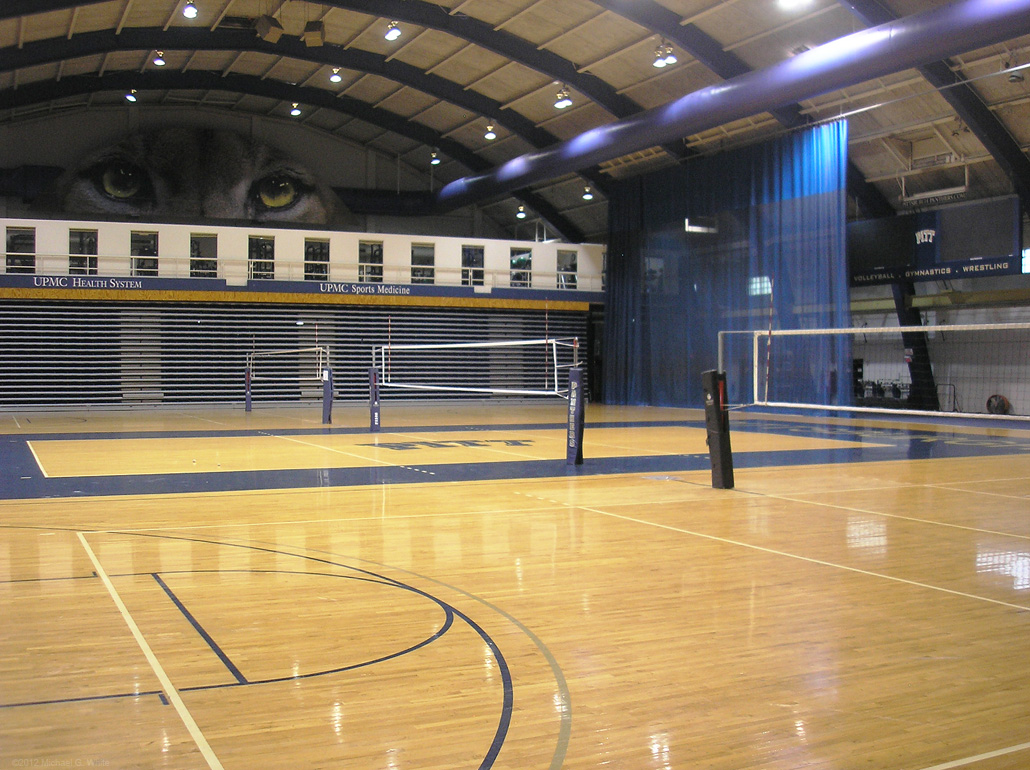
Courts inside Fitzgerald Field House

Fitzgerald Field House was the competitive venue for the Pitt varsity sports of volleyball, gymnastics, and wrestling. With an indoor track, the Field House also serves as the primary indoor facility for the university's track and field team, as well as formerly housing the wrestling training facility and the primary training and weight facilities for Pitt's Olympic sports. In addition, it contains the offices and locker rooms for baseball, cross country, soccer, softball, swimming and diving, and tennis. The facility also has squash courts. The Field House is connected by a tunnel to Trees Pool and the Gymnastics Training Center, both located in Trees Hall.

Built in 1951, Fitzgerald Field House was, for five decades, the home of Pitt's basketball program. The Field House saw the program to achieve a 414-175 (.703) record while utilizing the facility. It also served as the home basketball court of Pitt's intracity rival, the Duquesne University Dukes, from 1956 to 1964. From 1984 until 2002, the Pitt men's basketball team also played selected Big East Conference and non-conference games at the Civic Arena. Pitt's women's basketball team also used the Field House as their primary home court. Both the men's and women's Pitt basketball teams moved to the Petersen Events Center in 2002.

In 1999, Fitzgerald Field House underwent $3.8 million ($7.3 million today) in renovations of existing facilities and a major addition to the west side of the building for locker rooms, team dressing rooms, and training and equipment rooms. In the summer of 2005, the wrestling training facility built in 1951 was reconstructed to be twice the size of the previous training facility and also received new floor and wall mats, a new ventilation system, new lighting, a video and recruitment room, and a balcony suspended above the mats featuring cardio equipment. In addition, an Olympic sports weight room was added to serve as a primary training facility for over 300 Pitt student-athletes and includes Hammer Strength and Nautilus Next Generation machines, nearly 8,600 pounds of free weights, and a comprehensive cardiovascular unit, including treadmills, stationary bikes and the Stairmaster Gauntlet. The renovations and addition of the weight room reduced the seating capacity from its prior 6,798 seats to a capacity of 4,122.

Further renovations of the Field House in 2008 totaled $1.4 million ($2.1 million today) and included new volleyball courts and installation of seating and electronic equipment to meet NCAA requirements. In November, 2011, the Nathan Hershey Athletic Training Facility was dedicated in the Field House.

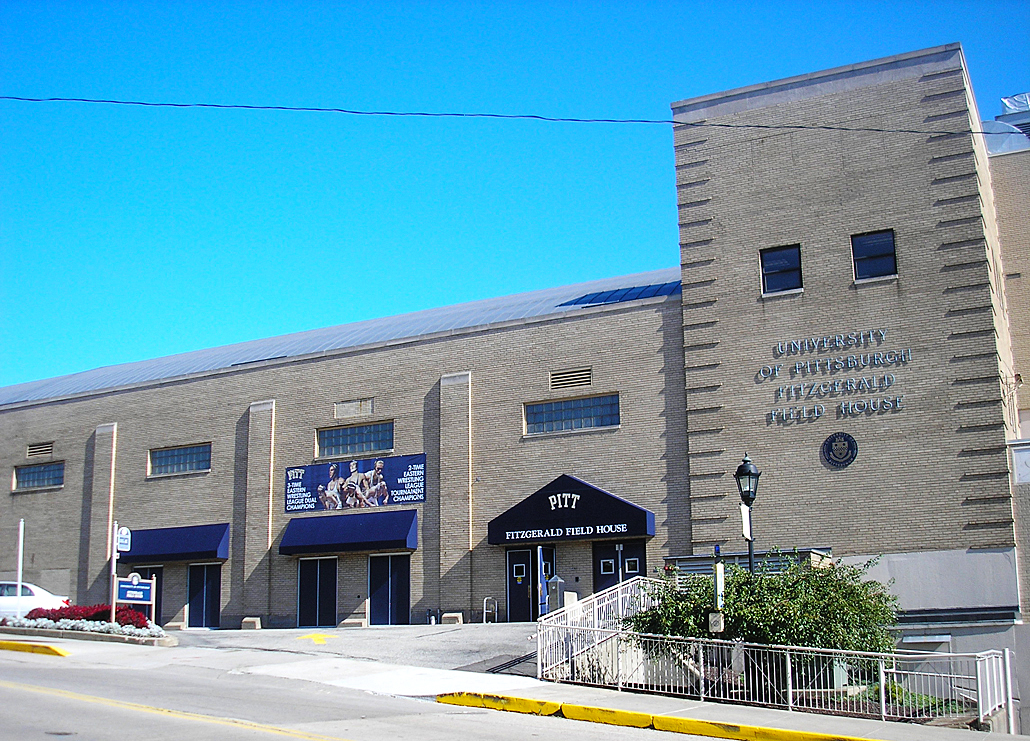
Main entrance with the 1999 addition on the right

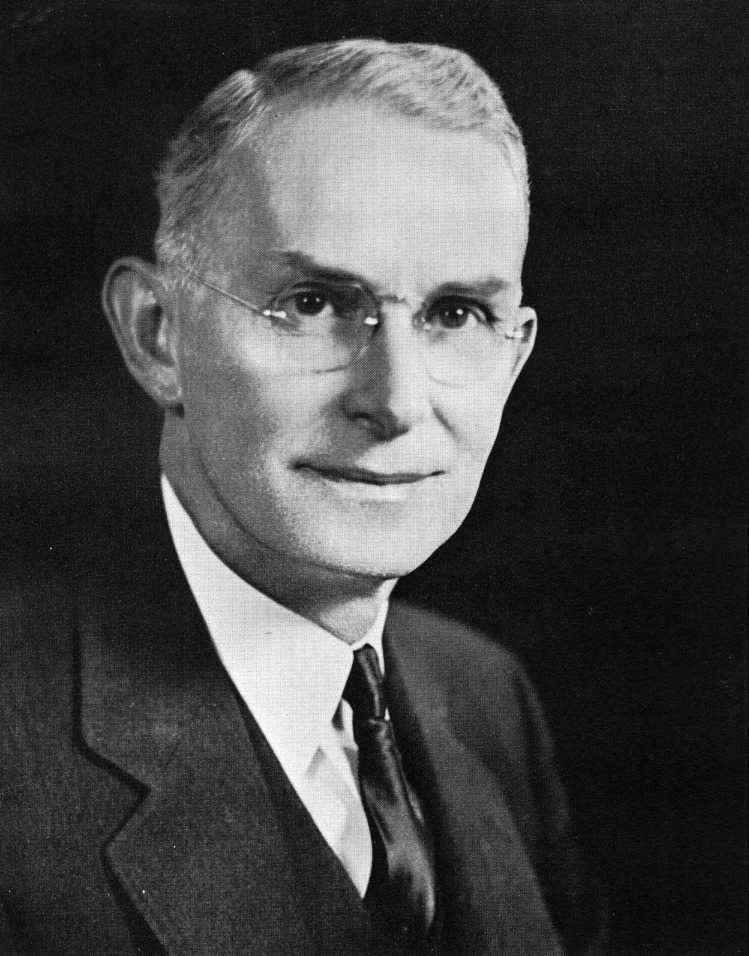
Rufus Fitzgerald

== Notable events ==
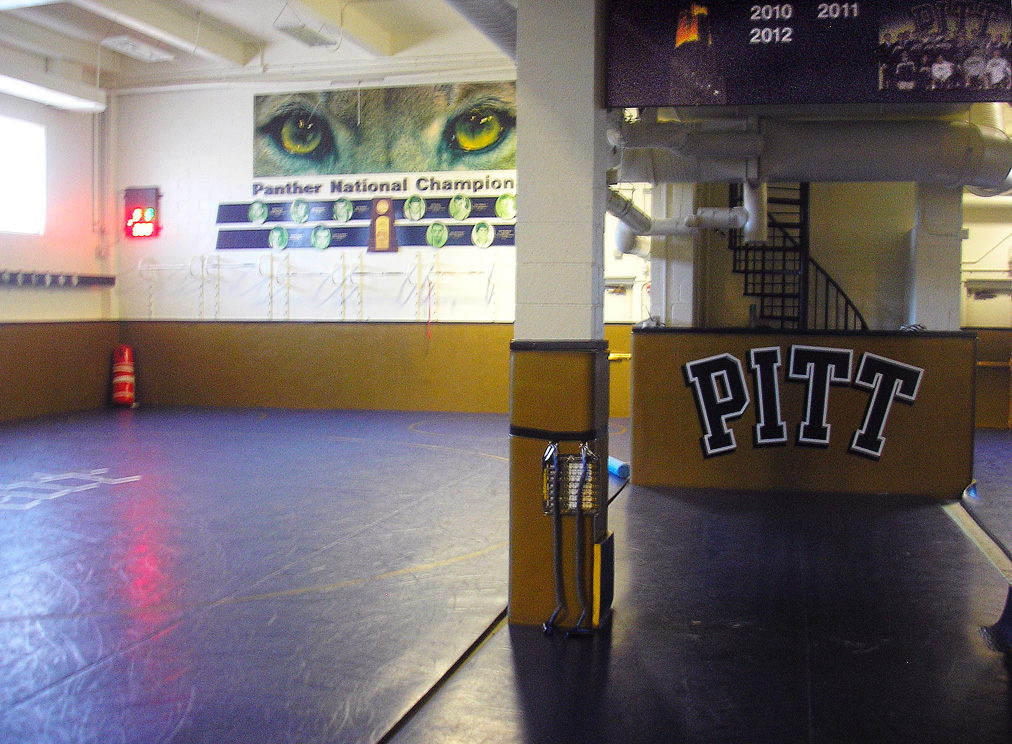
The Wrestling Room

- 1957 NCAA Wrestling Championship
- 1962 Speech delivered by President John F. Kennedy
- 1963 NCAA Men's Gymnastics Championship
- 1979 Eastern AIAW Volleyball Championship
- January 25, 1988 – In one of the most famous events in college basketball history, Pitt's Jerome Lane shattered the backboard with a slam dunk during the Panthers' game against Providence. The incident is equally memorable for Bill Raftery's broadcast call of "Send it in, Jerome!"
- 1998 NCAA Gymnastics Northeast Regional Championship
- 2005 Senior Olympics (basketball and shuffleboard)
- 3 East Atlantic Gymnastics League Championships (2000, 2004, 2012)
- 4 Eastern Wrestling League Championships (1979, 1992, 2000, 2008)
- 12 Big East Volleyball Championships (1986, 1988, 1991, 1992, 1996, 1998, 1999, 2001, 2002, 2004, 2008, 2010)
- 2021 and 2023 NCAA Women's Volleyball Regional Semifinals & Final
- Kamala Harris 2024 presidential campaign event featuring Barack Obama, Josh Shapiro, and Bob Casey Jr.

| Preceded by Salk Hall | University of Pittsburgh buildings Fitzgerald Field House; Constructed: 1951 | Succeeded by Lothrop Hall |
