= Gabbard =

Gabbard may refer to:

- Gabbard (surname), includes a list of notable people with the surname
  - Tulsi Gabbard (born 1981), American politician and military officer, former Director of National Intelligence
- Battle of the Gabbard (1653), in the First Anglo-Dutch War
- Greater Gabbard wind farm, off the coast of Suffolk in England
- HMS Gabbard, Battle-class destroyer of the Royal Navy, launched in 1945

== See also ==
- Gabbart, an inland sailing barge
- Gabbert, a surname
