= Gabbett =

Gabbett is a surname. The name is an alternative spelling of the British surname 'Gabbot', whose origins are uncertain but is either the diminutive of the given name Gabriel (ie, 'son of Gabriel') or, alternatively, came to Britain in the 11th century during the Norman Conquest in the form of the French name "Gabet". The surname Gabbett was first brought to County Limerick in Ireland in 1487. By the 17th century, the Gabbetts were a prominent landowning family in Limerick. The Gabbetts' dynastic wealth was decimated during the Great Famine of Ireland in the 1800s, after which time emigration spread the name to Australia and North America during the 19th and early 20th centuries.

== Notable people ==
- Daniel Fitzgerald Gabbett (1841–1898), Irish politician
- Edward Gabbett (1841–1912), Irish Catholic priest and Archdeacon of Limerick
- Michael Terrence Gabbett, Australian clinical geneticist
- Peter Gabbett (born 1941), English decathlete
- Sarah E. Gabbett (1833-1911), American medal designer and first Custodian of the Southern Cross of Honor
- (William) Todd Gabbett (1942–2021), American football player and coach

== Fiction ==
- Matthew Gabbett, an inmate and cannibal in Marcus Clarke's semi-fictional novel For the Term of His Natural Life

== See also ==
- Gabbert
