= Gabbert =

Gabbert is a surname. Notable people with the surname include:

- Blaine Gabbert (born 1989), American football player
- Brett Gabbert (born 2000), American football player
- James Gabbert (born 1936), San Francisco radio and television entrepreneur
- John Gabbert (1909–2013), American jurist
- John Gabbert Bowman (1877-1966), American academic
- Michael Gabbert, journalist whose investigations uncovered the 1964 British betting scandal
- Sandra Kay Gabbert, one of the victims of Green River Killer Gary Ridgway

== See also ==
- Gabbard (disambiguation)
- Gabbart
- Gabbett
