= Samuel McCormick =

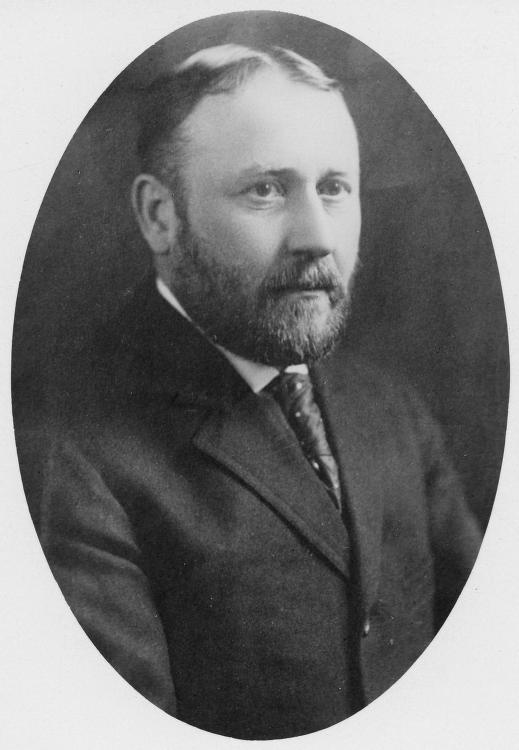

9th Chancellor of the University of Pittsburgh
- In office 1904–1921
- Preceded by: William Jacob Holland
- Succeeded by: John Gabbert Bowman

3rd President of Coe College
- In office 1897–1904
- Preceded by: James Marshall
- Succeeded by: S.W. Stookey

Personal details
- Born: May 6, 1858
- Died: April 18, 1928 (aged 69) Coraopolis, Pennsylvania, U.S.
- Spouse: Ida May Steep (m. 1882)
- Education: Washington & Jefferson College

Samuel Black McCormick (May 6, 1858 – April 18, 1928) was an attorney, Presbyterian clergyman, and educator who served as the third president of Coe College and the ninth Chancellor of the University of Pittsburgh.

He was the second child of Rachel (Black) and James Irwin McCormick and was named after his maternal grandfather. His father was a physician and classical scholar who schooled Samuel at home. As a teenager, after a brief stint in mercantile life, he returned to his studies with the assistance of his father and taught at schools in North Huntington, Pennsylvania. In 1877, he entered Washington and Jefferson College, graduating in 1880 with highest honors. For the next two years, he taught Greek at his alma mater and also at the nearby Canonsburg Academy. During this period, Dr. McCormick read the law with his uncle Henry H. McCormick, the U.S. District Attorney for Western Pennsylvania. He was admitted to the Allegheny County Bar in 1882.

== Biography ==
On September 29, 1882, he married Ida May Steep; they had four children. After a year in Pittsburgh, the couple moved to Denver, Colorado, where he practiced law for another three years. In 1887, McCormick gave up his law career to become a minister, returned to Pittsburgh, and entered the Western Theological Seminary. He was ordained in 1890 and became pastor of Central Presbyterian Church in Allegheny. During his five years with this church, he taught at the Seminary, served on its Board of Directors, and he occasionally taught English and rhetoric courses at the Western University of Pennsylvania. He was also a member of the Freedman's Board and the Board of the Pennsylvania College of Women (now Chatham College). In October, 1894, he was called to serve at the First Presbyterian Church of Omaha, Nebraska where he remained for three years. While in Omaha, McCormick was president of the board of trustees for both the Omaha Theological Seminary and Bellevue College.

In 1897, Dr. McCormick agreed to become the third president of Coe College, a struggling Presbyterian-affiliated institution located in Cedar Rapids, Iowa. During his seven-year administration, he increased the number and quality of the faculty, significantly raised student body numbers, doubled the number of campus buildings, and secured the financial foundation of the college. In addition, he was awarded two honorary degrees from his alma mater Washington and Jefferson College, his D.D. in 1897 and LL.D. in 1902. He also was placed on the Revision Committee of the General Assembly of the Presbyterian Church and served on that body's Special Committee.

In 1904, Dr. McCormick was invited to become chancellor of the Western University of Pennsylvania, which he accepted on the condition the trustees would support expansion of the school. He was inaugurated on February 22, 1905. His administration his best known for changing the name of the university (from Western University of Pennsylvania) and moving it from Allegheny City (currently Pittsburgh's Northside neighborhood) to its current location in Oakland. McCormick's administration also established Pitt's dental, medical, business, and education schools.

Dr. McCormick was also noted for his leadership in resisting pressures to abandon the school's commitment to liberal education in favor of more technical-based training, establishing a tenure system, and moving the university to the Oakland neighborhood of Pittsburgh where it began to build a classically influenced campus designed by Henry Hornbostel. McCormick would also lead the university into a new level of national recognition, expansion, and growth, as well as begin institutional support of athletics (especially football, hiring Glenn “Pop” Warner as head coach in 1915).

Citing his age and decreasing energy, Dr. McCormick retired in January 1920. Nonetheless, he continued to write, speak, and preach and maintained his interest in public affairs as Chancellor Emeritus, a member of the committee for the revision of the confession of faith of the General Assembly of the Presbyterian Church, a director of the Western Theological Seminary, a trustee of the Carnegie Foundation for the advancement of Teaching, and a member of the Pittsburgh Chamber of Commerce.

After a brief illness from pneumonia, Dr. McCormick died at his home in Coraopolis Heights, near Pittsburgh. The university cancelled classes for his funeral, His predecessor as Chancellor, Dr. W. J. Holland, conducted the service and honorary pall bearers included all senior administrators of the university, several local and state political leaders, and such notables as Andrew W. Mellon and Howard Heinz.

At the University of Pittsburgh, one of the high rise residence halls located on 3990 Fifth Avenue in the Schenley Quadrangle is called “McCormick Hall,” named after Samuel Black McCormick. This residence hall houses upperclassmen in suites.

Preceded by William Jacob Holland	University of Pittsburgh Chancellor; 1904–1921	Succeeded by John Gabbert Bowman
