= Jeanne Hannington Goulding =

New Zealand botanist (1915–2009)

Jeanne Hannington Goulding (1915–2009) was a New Zealand botanist. From 1978 to 1980 she was head of the botany department at Auckland Institute and Museum.

== Biography ==
Goulding's parents were Vera Goulding and John Hannington Goulding, who was killed in action in World War I five months after leaving New Zealand in 1915.

She was on the staff of the botany department at Auckland Institute and Museum, and was head of the department from 1978 to 1980. One of her achievements in the department was to mount the bookplates in the Percy Neville Barnett Collection of the museum library.

== Publications ==
- Goulding J. H. (1971). Phormium : or New Zealand flax. Auckland Institute and Museum.
- Goulding J. H. (J. H. & Osborne F. (1983). Fanny Osborne's flower paintings. Auckland N.Z.
