= Lilian Gibbard =

New Zealand artist

Lilian M. Gibbard née Osborne (1877–1977) was a New Zealand artist known for her paintings of English wildflowers. She is the daughter of botanical illustrator Fanny Osborne. She married Thomas Gibbard and moved to England, where she won medals at exhibitions of the Royal Horticultural Society.
