= Rufus Fitzgerald =

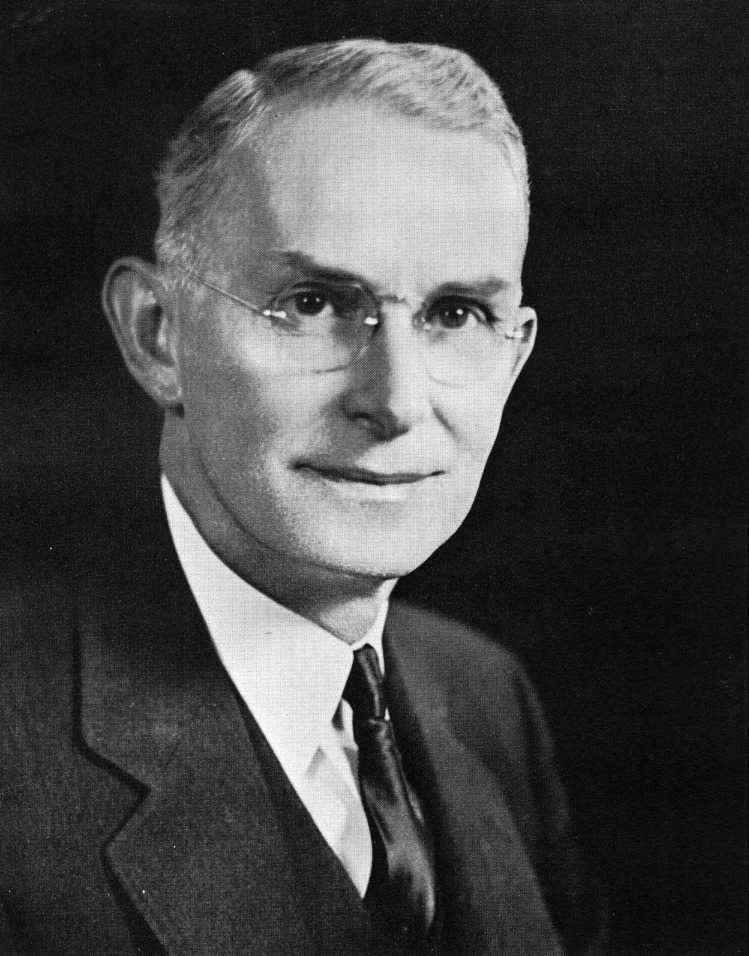

11th Chancellor of the University of Pittsburgh
- In office 1945–1955
- Preceded by: John Gabbert Bowman
- Succeeded by: Edward Litchfield

Personal details
- Born: November 22, 1890
- Died: April 11, 1966 (aged 75)
- Education: University of Tennessee, Knoxville

Rufus Henry Fitzgerald (November 22, 1890 – April 11, 1966) was the eleventh Chancellor (1945–1955) of the University of Pittsburgh.

He was born on November 22, 1890 in Pelham, North Carolina. He received his B.A degree from Guilford College in 1911 and later graduated from the University of Tennessee-Knoxville in 1919 with a master's degree. He became a member of the Sigma Chi fraternity as an undergraduate.

He worked at the University of Iowa from 1919 to 1938 and was appointed as the head of the Department of History and Appreciation of Fine Arts in 1934. He resigned from that position in February 1938 in order to accept an offer from the University of Pittsburgh.

His administration is best remembered for its smooth ten-year tenure: reinstatement of athletic scholarships at the university, expansion of the student body, especially returning veterans after World War II, and the worldwide success of Jonas Salk's polio vaccine developed at Pitt's medical center.

Fitzgerald Field House, an athletic venue on the Pitt campus which opened during his tenure, is named in his honor.

Preceded by John Gabbert Bowman	University of Pittsburgh Chancellor; 1945–1955	Succeeded by Edward Litchfield
