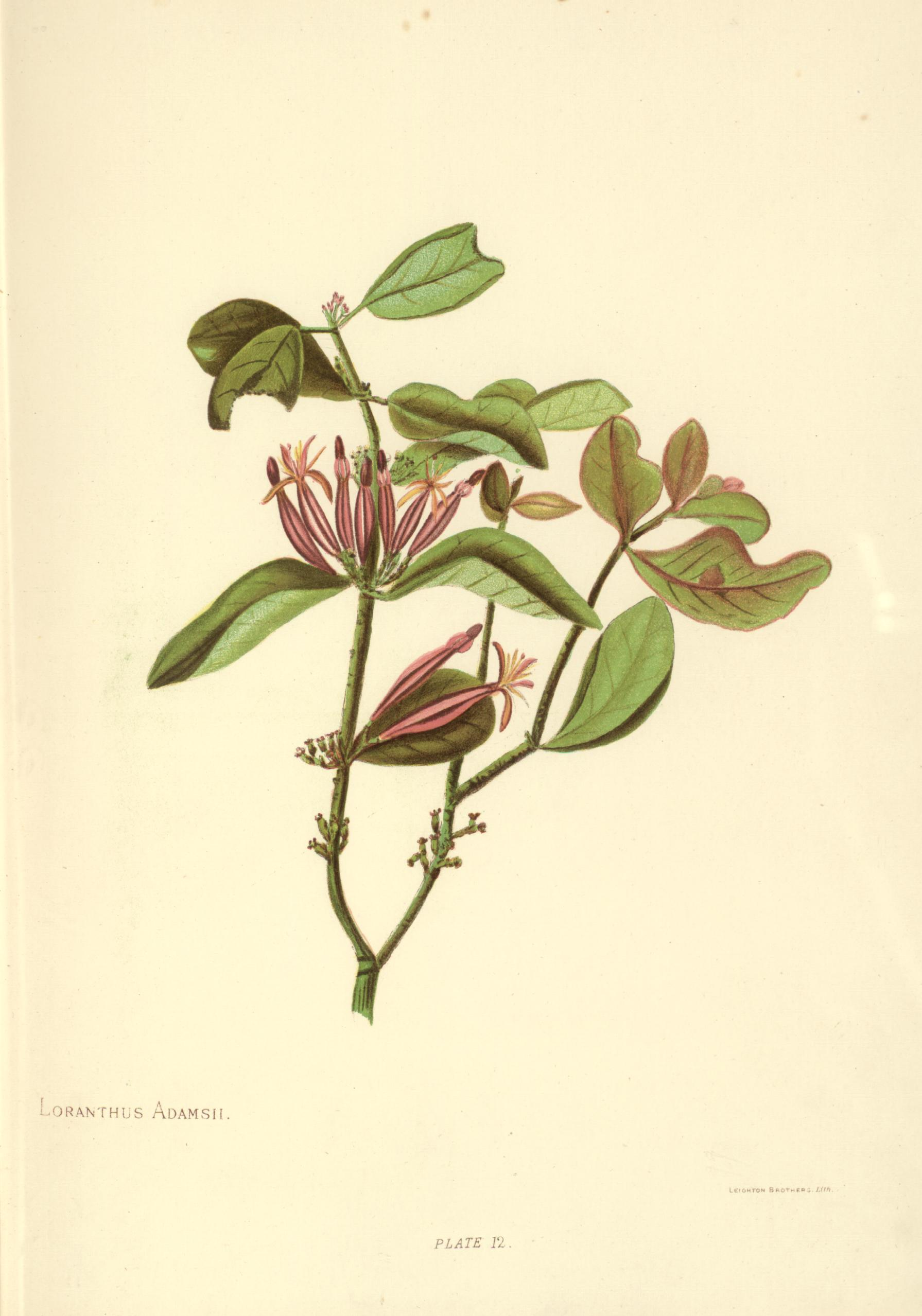

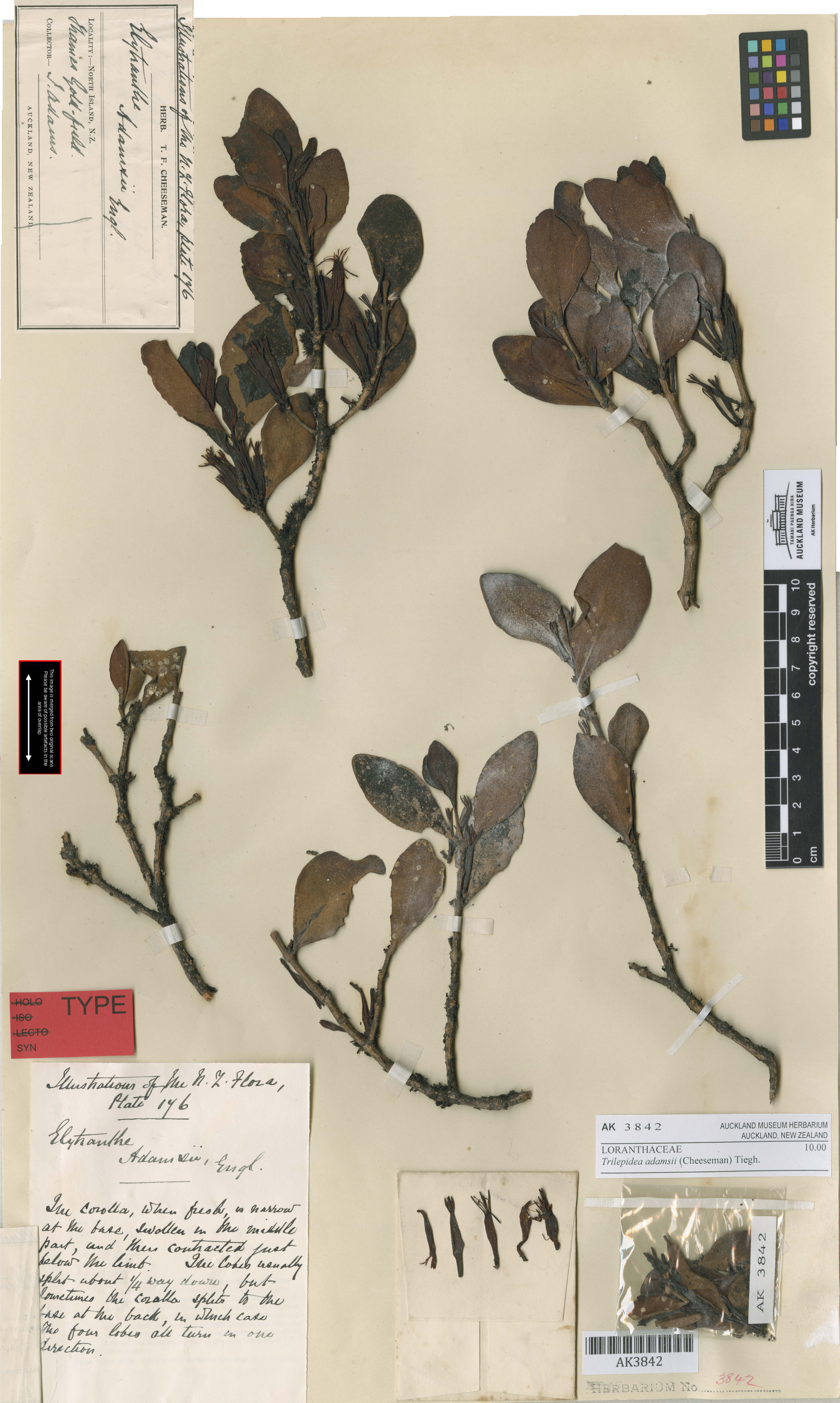
- Herbarium specimen of Trilepidea adamsii

Conservation status
- Extinct (IUCN 3.1)

Scientific classification
- Kingdom: Plantae
- Clade: Tracheophytes
- Clade: Angiosperms
- Clade: Eudicots
- Order: Santalales
- Family: Loranthaceae
- Genus: †Trilepidea; Tiegh.
- Species: †T. adamsii

Binomial name
- †Trilepidea adamsii (Cheeseman) Tiegh.

Synonyms
- †Elytranthe adamsii (Cheeseman) Engl.; †Elytranthe ralphii (Tiegh.) Engl.; †Loranthus adamsii Cheeseman; †Loranthus ralphii Tiegh.; †Trilepidea ralphii (Tiegh.) Tiegh.

= Trilepidea =

Extinct genus of flowering plants

Trilepidea is an extinct monotypic genus of flowering plants belonging to the family Loranthaceae. Its native range was New Zealand. The only species was Trilepidea adamsii, or Adams mistletoe. It was first described in 1880 as Loranthus adamsii and has ever only been collected from a few locations in the North Island. It has been argued that the extinction of this species, vulnerable due to restricted distribution, was caused by interaction of a number of factors, including; habitat loss, overcollection and the introduction the brushtail possum from Australia.
