= John Gabbert Bowman =

American poet (1877–1962)

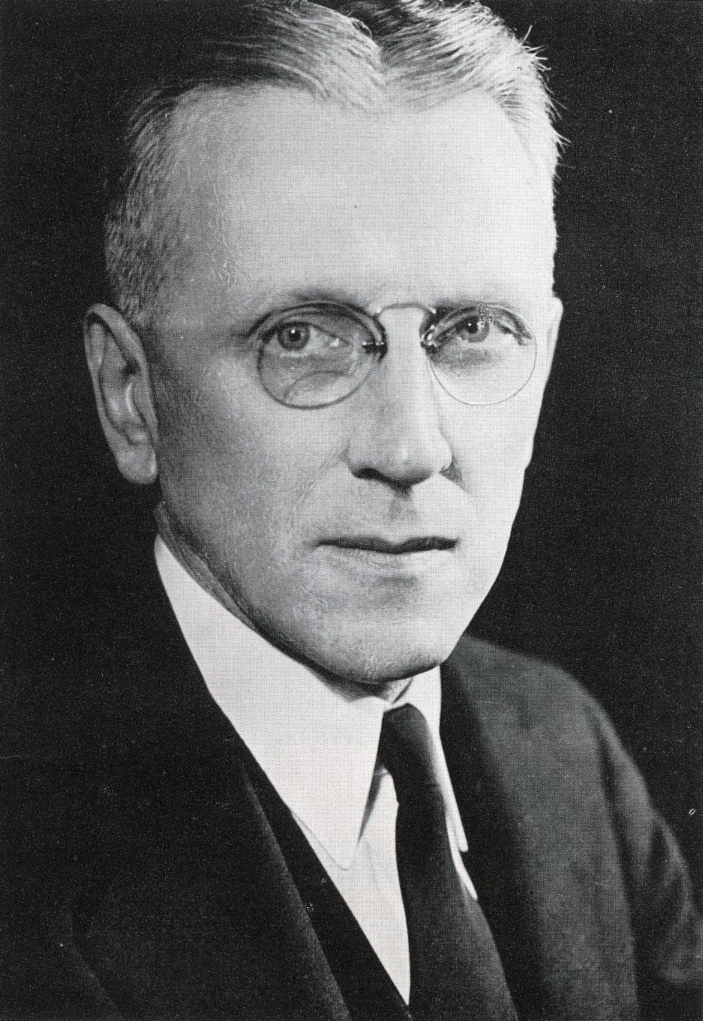
- Bowman c. 1935

10th Chancellor of the University of Pittsburgh
- In office 1921–1945
- Preceded by: Samuel McCormick
- Succeeded by: Rufus Fitzgerald

9th President of the University of Iowa
- In office 1911–1914
- Preceded by: George Edwin MacLean
- Succeeded by: Thomas Huston Macbride

Personal details
- Born: May 18, 1877 Davenport, Iowa, U.S.
- Died: December 2, 1962 (aged 85) Bedford, Massachusetts, U.S.
- Spouse: Florence Ridgway Berry
- Children: 2
- Education: University of Iowa (BA, MA, DLitt)
- Occupation: Poet

John Gabbert Bowman (May 18, 1877 – December 2, 1962) was the tenth Chancellor (1921–1945) of the University of Pittsburgh and the ninth President (1911–1914) of the University of Iowa.

He is best known for initiating and completing the 42-story Cathedral of Learning, the centerpiece of Pitt's campus, over the objections of many faculty and community members. At the time, it was the tallest educational structure in the world. He also established the University of Pittsburgh Press and oversaw the institution of controversial athletic policies that resulted in the resignation in popular head football coach Jock Sutherland.

== Early life ==
Bowman was born in Davenport, Iowa. He married Florence Ridgway Berry and they had two children.

He also worked as a journalist in Iowa and Illinois, taught in a one-room rural Iowa school and at Columbia University. From Columbia, he worked at the newly founded Carnegie Foundation for the Advancement of Teaching.

== Career ==
In 1915, he became the founding director of the American College of Surgeons, where he served until 1921.

Bowman was the first University of Iowa alumnus to become its President, as well as the school's first Iowa-born chief administrator. He earned the B.A. degree in 1899, the M.A. in 1904, and the Litt.D. in 1934. He became a member of the Sigma Chi fraternity as an undergraduate.

He arrived on campus in 1921. Bowman resigned as chancellor from the University of Pittsburgh in 1945. The trustees named him President Honorarius and awarded him an honorary doctorate of laws.

== Death and legacy ==
He died at age 85 on December 2, 1962, in Bedford, Pennsylvania.

He is mentioned in the book, Jewels in Your Crown: Mining the Treasures Within.

== Books ==
- The World That Was, nonfiction (New Brunswick: Rutgers University Press, 1947).
- Nationality Rooms of the University of Pittsburgh, with Ruth Crawford Mitchell and Andrey Avinoff, nonfiction (Pittsburgh: University of Pittsburgh Press, 1947).
- Happy All Day Through, poetry (Chicago: P.F. Volland Company, 1917).

== Location of his papers ==
- The John G. Bowman Papers are housed at the University of Iowa Special Collections & University Archives.
- The Chancellor Bowman Administrative Files are housed at the Archives Service Center at the University of Pittsburgh.

Academic offices
| Preceded by George Edwin MacLean | President of the University of Iowa; 1911–1914 | Succeeded by Thomas Huston Macbride |
| Preceded by Samuel McCormick | University of Pittsburgh Chancellor; 1921–1945 | Succeeded by Rufus Fitzgerald |
