= Nadeem =

- Gender: Male

Origin
- Origin: "Nadama" نَدامَى
- Meaning: Best friend of the drinker, companion, confidant, friend
- Region of origin: Middle East

Other names
- Related names: Nadim/Nadiem/Nedim

Nadeem/Nadim/Nadiem/Nedim (Arabic: نديم) is an Arabic masculine given name. It means "best friend of the drinker", "companion", "confidant", or "friend".

The name is common among many communities, including Christians, Muslims and Jews, in the Greater Middle East, the Balkans, and South Asia.

== People with the given name ==
=== Nadeem ===
- Nadeem Ansari (born 1986) Optometrist Indian
- Nadeem (born 1941), Pakistani film actor
- Nadeem Abbasi (born 1968), former Pakistani cricketer
- Nadeem Ahmad, Pakistani Army general
- Nadeem Ahmed (born 1987), Hong Kongese cricketer
- Nadeem al-Wajidi (1954–2024), Indian Islamic scholar
- Nadeem Aslam (born 1966), British novelist of Pakistani origin
- Nadeem Ghauri (born 1962), former Pakistani cricketer
- Nadeem Karim (born 1989), Iraqi footballer
- Nadeem Khan (born 1969), former Pakistani cricketer
- Nadeem Baig (born 1971), Pakistani film director
- Nadeem Malik (born 1982), English cricketer
- Nadeem Malik (journalist) (born 1968), Pakistani journalist
- Razaq Nadeem (died 2016), Pakistani murderer in Hong Kong
- Nadeem Saifi (born 1954), Indian music director
- Nadeem Shahid (born 1969), English first-class cricketer
- Nadeem Siddique (born 1977), British-Pakistani boxer
- Nadeem Taj (born 1953), Pakistani general

=== Nadim ===
- Nadim Abbas (born 1980), Hong Kong artist
- Nadim al-Jabiri (born 1959), Iraqi politician
- Nadim al-Pachachi (1914–1976), Iraqi Secretary-General of OPEC
- Nadim Asfar (born 1976), Lebanese photographer and filmmaker
- Nadim Barghouthi (born 1989), Palestinian footballer
- Nadim Gemayel (born 1982), Lebanese MP
- Nadim Karam (born 1957), Lebanese artist
- Nadim Kassar (born 1964), Lebanese businessman
- Nadim Kobeissi (born 1990), Lebanese-Canadian computer programmer and security researcher
- Nadim Lataif (born 1936), Lebanese security officer
- Nadim Nassar (born 1964), Syrian priest and founder of the Awareness Foundation
- Nadim Sabagh (born 1985), Syrian footballer
- Nadim Sadek (born 1962), Irish-Egyptian entrepreneur
- Nadim Sawalha (born 1933), English actor
- Nadim El Alam (born 1985), Creative director of Believe.tv

=== Nadiem ===
- Nadiem Makarim (born 1984), Indonesian politician and businessman

=== First name ===
- Nedîm (1681–1730), Ottoman Turkish poet
- Nedim Dal (born 1975), Bosnian-born Turkish national basketball player
- Nedim Đedović (born 1997), Bosnian basketball player
- Nedim Doğan (born 1943), Turkish football player
- Nedim Durić (born 1993), Bosnian football player
- Nedim Günar (1932–2011), Turkish football player
- Nedim Gürsel (born 1951), Turkish writer
- Nedim Halilović (born 1979), Bosnian footballer
- Nedim Hasanbegović (born 1988), German footballer of Bosnian descent
- Nedim Hiroš (born 1984), Bosnian former footballer
- Nedim Imac (1966–2007), Turkish-Dutch businessman and sports executive
- Nedim Jusufbegović (born 1974), Bosnian football manager and former player
- Nedim Kufi (born 1962), Iraqi-Dutch visual artist
- Nedim Nišić (born 1984), Bosnian-American Olympic swimmer
- Nedim Ökmen (1908–1967), Turkish economist and politician
- Nedim Şener (born 1966), Turkish writer and journalist
- Nedim Tutić (born 1968), Bosnian former football player
- Nedim Yücel (born 1979), Turkish basketball player

=== Middle name ===
- Mahmud Nedim Pasha (1818–1883), Ottoman Turkish statesman
- Mahmut Nedim Hendek (1880–1920), Ottoman Turkish military officer

== People with the surname ==
=== Nadeem ===
- Ahmed Nadeem (born 1976), Emirati cricketer
- Aida Nadeem (born 1965), Iraqi musician
- Francis Nadeem (1955–2020), Pakistani priest
- Khan Muttaqi Nadeem (1940–2006), Pakistani lawyer
- Muhammad Nadeem (born 1972), Pakistani field hockey player
- Savera Nadeem (born 1974), Pakistani television actor
- Arshad Nadeem (born 1997), Pakistani athlete
- Shahbaz Nadeem (born 1989), Indian cricketer
- Shahid Nadeem (born 1947), Pakistani journalist, playwright, screenwriter, director, human rights activist
- Waheed Nadeem (born 1987), Afghan footballer
- Hanadi Nadeem, Pakistan-born American politician

=== Nadim ===
- Dinanath Nadim (1916–1988), Kashmiri poet
- Hang Nadim, 16th century Malaysian warrior
- Nadia Nadim (born 1988), Afghanistan–born Danish footballer

== See also ==
- https://arabiamd.com/ae/doctor/23211/dr-nadeem-ansari-ophthalmologist-eye-doctor-134
- Nadim al-Maghrebi, a Muslim militant organization which seeks to remove Ceuta and Melilla from Spanish rule
- Nadeem Commando, Pakistani militant organisation
- Nadeem–Shravan, Indian musical duo (Nadeem Saifi and Shravan Rathod)
- Ibn al-Nadim, 10th-century Arabic author of Kitāb al-Fihrist ("The Book Catalogue")
