= Awareness Sunday =

Christian event in the United Kingdom

Awareness Sunday is an annual Christian event in the UK. It takes place each year on a Sunday in September and is giving people an opportunity to dedicate themselves to "healing and reconciliation in our communities"; it is an initiative of the Awareness Foundation,

The Awareness Foundation have stated, "Awareness Sunday is an annual opportunity to reflect on the value of loving our neighbour as ourself, even if our neighbour is of a different religious faith or worldview." According to the Awareness Sunday website, "This is an invitation to everyone, whatever their faith or world view, to join us at this time and make a commitment to change attitudes and build relationships in your own community, based on respect and understanding."

== Supporters ==
Awareness Sunday has been supported by clergy including the Archbishop of Canterbury, the Archbishop of York, Archbishop Desmond Tutu, as well as other clergy in the Church of England, the Roman Catholic Church, the Methodist Church and the Baptist Church. In addition, Awareness Sunday is supported by Lord Sacks, the former Chief Rabbi for the United Kingdom and Commonwealth, and Sunni and Shia scholars.

== Main events in 2011 ==
A special public service of remembrance and reconciliation for Awareness Sunday took place at Westminster Abbey in London at 6:30 pm on Sunday 11 September 2011. The Abbey was packed with people from around the world including Londoners, tourists, priests, imams and rabbis. A large number of those attending were American. Other events took place across the UK, and internationally. Nadim Nassar, Director of the Awareness Foundation, preached, and Courtney Cowart, a survivor of 9/11, spoke about her experiences. Cowart laid a wreath at the Memorial to Innocent Victims during the service.

In addition, the Sunday Worship on BBC Radio 4 at 8:10 am on the morning of 11 September featured a live broadcast of a special Awareness Sunday service at Grosvenor Chapel in London. Nassar preached and Cowart spoke. In addition, a memorial candle was lit by Barbara J. Stephenson, Deputy Chief of Mission at the US Embassy in London.

== 2020s ==
Awareness Sunday was held in 2020, with the theme A Sign of Hope. The event has not been held in 2021, 2022 or 2023.

== See also ==
- World Communion Sunday
