= Pehchan (1975 film) =

1975 Pakistani film

- پہچان
- Directed by: Pervaiz Malik
- Written by: Jalil Afghani (story); Fayyaz Hashmi (dialogues)
- Screenplay by: Pervaiz Malik
- Produced by: Anis Dossani
- Starring: Nadeem; Shabnam; Sabiha Khanam; Qavi; Munawar Saeed
- Music by: Nisar Bazmi
- Production company: F.A. Dossani Films
- Release date: 1 August 1975
- Running time: 143 minutes
- Country: Pakistan
- Language: Urdu

Pehchan is a 1975 Pakistani action-drama film directed by Pervaiz Malik. The film stars Nadeem and Shabnam, with Sabiha Khanam, Qavi Khan, and Munawar Saeed playing supporting roles. The film revolves around a family that lost its sole heir and was inspired by the famous Tichborne and Bhawal cases. The music was composed by Nisar Bazmi. It released on 1 August 1975 and was a success at the box office. At the 1975 Nigar Awards, the film received two awards.

== Plot ==
The story starts when the mother of a young boy named Janu dies at a railway station. Afterwards, a rich woman's secretary takes him to her mistress's house. The mistress welcomes Janu and raises him with her son, Rashid. While playing, Rashid mistakenly shoots Janu and runs away, leaving the city out of fear of being arrested. However, nothing happens to Janu and the bullet just touches him. Unfortunately, Rashid gets trapped by a rich man who uses him for illegal activities.

Several years later, Janu is now closer with the mistress and handles all of her properties. Sara, the daughter of the mistress's husband, comes to live with them. She educates the villagers women about their health and family planning but Janu calls them vulgar things. He also teases Sara at different events, so she decides to leave the village. When Janu learns that she is leaving the village he stops her and confesses his love for her.

One day, Mistress is saddened remembering her lost son Rashid, so Janu decides to help her by placing a newspaper advertisement about Rashid's years-long absence from his family. Rashid sees the advertisement and decides to come back home. During his journey on the train, Rashid reveals the details of his situation to an unknown person, who turns out to be a criminal. The criminal decides to kill Rashid and disguise as him so that he can steal his property, so he injures Rashid by throwing him out of the train.

When the disguised Rashid goes home everyone notices his strange behaviour. He gets angry whenever Rashid's childhood is discussed. One day, the mistress's secretary brings another person to the house. He seems to be irrational, but the person is actually Rashid. When the fake Rashid learns of his arrival he tries to kill him but fails, creating doubts in Janu's mind that the disguised Rashid is legitimate. An old, blind fakir who has been living in the village for years comes across the unstable Rashid, feels his presence and tells Janu that he is the real Rashid. Janu is shocked and decides to expose the fake Rashid in front of everyone, but he fails and nobody believes him. The fake Rashid tells the mistress to secure his marriage with Sara. Although Sara denies him at first, she later agrees after Janu approves it. When the mistress learns of the engagement she arranges the weeding.

One day, the mistress falls ill and asks the fake Rashid to sing the song that he sang in his childhood, but he cannot. At that moment, Janu comes with the real Rashid, who successfully sings the song. The identity of fake Rashid is revealed, Rashid reunites with his family after his years-long absence, and the mistress arranges a marriage between Sara and Janu.

== Cast ==
- Nadeem as Janu
- Shabnam as Sara
- Sabiha Khanam as Malkin (the Mistress)
- Qavi Khan as Rashid
- Munawar Saeed as a criminal
- Nayyar Sultana as fakirni (guest appearance)

== Soundtrack ==
All lyrics are written by Masroor Anwar; all music is composed by Nisar Bazmi.

No.	Title	Singer (s)	Length
1.	"Allah Hi Allah Kiya Karo" (Pictured on Nayyar Sultana)	Naheed Akhtar
2.	"Apne Se Lagte Hain" (Pictured on Shabnam)	Naheed Akhtar
3.	"Mera Pyar Tere Jeevan Ke" (Pictured on Qavi Khan & Nadeem)	Mehdi Hassan
4.	"Mera Pyar Tere Jeevan Ke" (Pictured on Qavi Khan)	Mehnaz Begum
5.	"Hum Ne Kiya Hai Pyar" (Pictured on Nadeem & Shabnam)	Ahmed Rushdi, Naheed Akhtar
6.	"Ae Dil, Apna Dard Chhupa Kar" (Pictured on Nadeem)	Akhlaq Ahmed
7.	"O Mere Des Ki Baat Hai Nirali" (Pictured on Nadeem & Shabnam)	Akhlaq Ahmed, Mehnaz

== Inspiration ==
The main storyline of Pehchan was inspired by two famous identity disputes, the Tichborne case of Victorian Britain and the Bhawal case of British India. In the Tichborne case, an impostor claimed to be the long-lost Roger Tichborne and was initially accepted by his mother, Lady Tichborne, before being exposed as a fraud. In contrast, the Bhawal case involved a prince of the Bhawal Estate who returned after being presumed dead and, following a lengthy legal battle, was recognized as the genuine prince and awarded his rightful inheritance.

Pehchan combines elements of both cases. The real heir, Rashid, returns home after many years, but a criminal assumes his identity and reaches his family before him. The impostor is accepted as Rashid by the family, including his mother, the Mistress, while the real Rashid attempts to prove his identity. The impostor is eventually exposed as a fraud, and Rashid is recognized as the rightful heir.

The mother-in-law of the lead actress, Shabnam, was a witness in the Bhawal case.

== Legacy ==
The film ran celebrated a silver jubilee in the Lahore cinemas and a diamond jubilee in the Karachi cinemas. It marked the first platinum jubilee movie of the Nadeem-Shabnam pair.

The film's song Allahi Allah Kiya Karo, pictured on senior Pakistani actress Nayyar Sultana, became a cultural icon of Islamic music in the Indian subcontinent. The song became a big hit in India, Bangladesh, and the South Asian diaspora. It has been covered by numerous artists, including an Urdu-English dual version by Swedish singer Maher Zain released in 2009.

=== Remake ===
The film was remade in Bollywood as Namak. It starred Sanjay Dutt and was released in 1996. Mera Pyar Tere Jeevan Ke was sung by Abhijeet Bhattacharya with another version by Ranjana Joglekar.

== Awards and nominations ==
The film received the following two awards at the 1975 Nigar Awards:

- Best lyrics: Masroor Anwar
- Best female singer: Naheed Akhtar
