= Michael Marshall (bishop) =

British Anglican bishop

The Rt Revd Michael Marshall
- Bishop of Woolwich
- Diocese: Diocese of Southwark
- In office: 1975–1984
- Predecessor: David Sheppard
- Successor: Peter Hall
- Other posts: Interim rector, Church of the Heavenly Rest (February 2012–October 2013); Rector of Holy Trinity Sloane Street (1997–2007 and Hon. Asst. 2015-); Honorary assistant bishop in London (1984–present); and in Chichester (1992–present)

Orders
- Ordination: 1960 (deacon); 1961 (priest)
- Consecration: 1975

Personal details
- Born: 14 April 1936 (age 90) Lincoln, UK
- Denomination: Anglican
- Residence: Manhattan, NYC (2012–2013); Chelsea, London (usually)
- Profession: Author (theology)
- Education: Christ's College, Cambridge

Michael Eric Marshall (born 14 April 1936) is a British Anglican bishop who served as the eighth Bishop of Woolwich in the Church of England from 1975 to 1984.

== Education and career ==
Marshall was educated at Lincoln Grammar School and Christ's College, Cambridge. He was ordained a deacon at Michaelmas (26 September) 1960 by the Rt. Rev. Leonard Wilson, Bishop of Birmingham, at St Peter's Church, Spring Hill, in Birmingham, and was ordained a priest the following Michaelmas (25 September 1961) by the Rt. Rev. Michael Parker, Bishop of Aston, at St Agatha's Church, Sparkbrook.

His first ministry position was as a curate at St Peter's Church, Spring Hill, after which he was temporarily a tutor at Ely Theological College and then a chaplain at the University of London. Appointed vicar of All Saints, Margaret Street, London, in 1969, he was consecrated Bishop of Woolwich by the Most Rev. Donald Coggan, Archbishop of Canterbury, at Westminster Abbey six years later, on 23 September 1975.

Resigning in 1984, he became Director of the Anglican Institute in St Louis, Missouri, in the United States of America before returning to England to be Director of Evangelism at Chichester Theological College. He then became, first, priest in charge and, later, rector of Holy Trinity, Sloane Street, in London, from 1997 to 2007.

In 2003 Marshall founded the Awareness Foundation with the Rev. Nadim Nassar and is currently its President Emeritus and co-author of the Awareness Course. His SPA (Scripture Prayer Action) ministry was developed with the Rev. Soon Han Choi and was initially based at the Church of the Annunciation, Marble Arch, in London.

From 2011 to 2013 Marshall served as interim rector of the Episcopal Church of the Heavenly Rest in New York City, prior to the installation of the Rev. Matthew Heyd. After returning to the United Kingdom he became an honorary assistant priest at Holy Trinity Sloane Street. In retirement he serves as an assistant bishop in London.

== Publications ==
Marshall's books include A Pattern of Faith (1966), Glory under Your Feet (1978), Pilgrimage and Promise (1981), Renewal in Worship (1982), The Gospel Connection and Flame in the Mind (2002) and The Transforming Power of Prayer: From Illusion to Reality (2011).

Church of England titles
Preceded by David Sheppard	Bishop of Woolwich; 1975–1984	Succeeded by Peter Hall
