= World Communion Sunday =

Christian celebration

- Significance: Eucharist
- Date: First Sunday of October
- 2024 date: October 6
- 2025 date: October 5
- 2026 date: October 4
- 2027 date: October 3
- Frequency: Annual
- Started by: Shadyside Presbyterian Church

World Communion Sunday is a celebration observed by several Protestant denominations, taking place on the first Sunday of every October, that promotes Christian unity and ecumenical cooperation. It focuses on an observance of the Eucharist. The tradition was begun in 1933 by Hugh Thomson Kerr who ministered in the Shadyside Presbyterian Church.

According to Presbyterian Outlook:

Davitt S. Bell (the late Clerk of Session and church historian at Shadyside) recalled that Dr. Kerr first conceived the notion of World Communion Sunday during his year as moderator of the General Assembly (1930). Dr. Kerr's younger son, the Rev. Dr. Donald Craig Kerr, who is pastor emeritus of the Roland Park Presbyterian Church in Baltimore, was sixteen in 1933. He has related that World Communion Sunday grew out of the Division of Stewardship at Shadyside. It was their attempt to bring churches together in a service of Christian unity—in which everyone might receive both inspiration and information, and above all, to know how important the Church of Jesus Christ is, and how each congregation is interconnected one with another.

It was then adopted throughout the Presbyterian Church (USA) in 1936 and subsequently spread to other denominations. In 1940, the Federal Council of Churches (now the National Council of Churches), led by Jesse Moren Bader, endorsed World Communion Sunday and began to promote it to Christian churches worldwide.

== See also ==
- Awareness Sunday
- Week of Prayer for Christian Unity
