= Shadyside Presbyterian Church =

Historic church in Pennsylvania, United States

- U.S. National Register of Historic Places
- Pittsburgh Landmark – PHLF
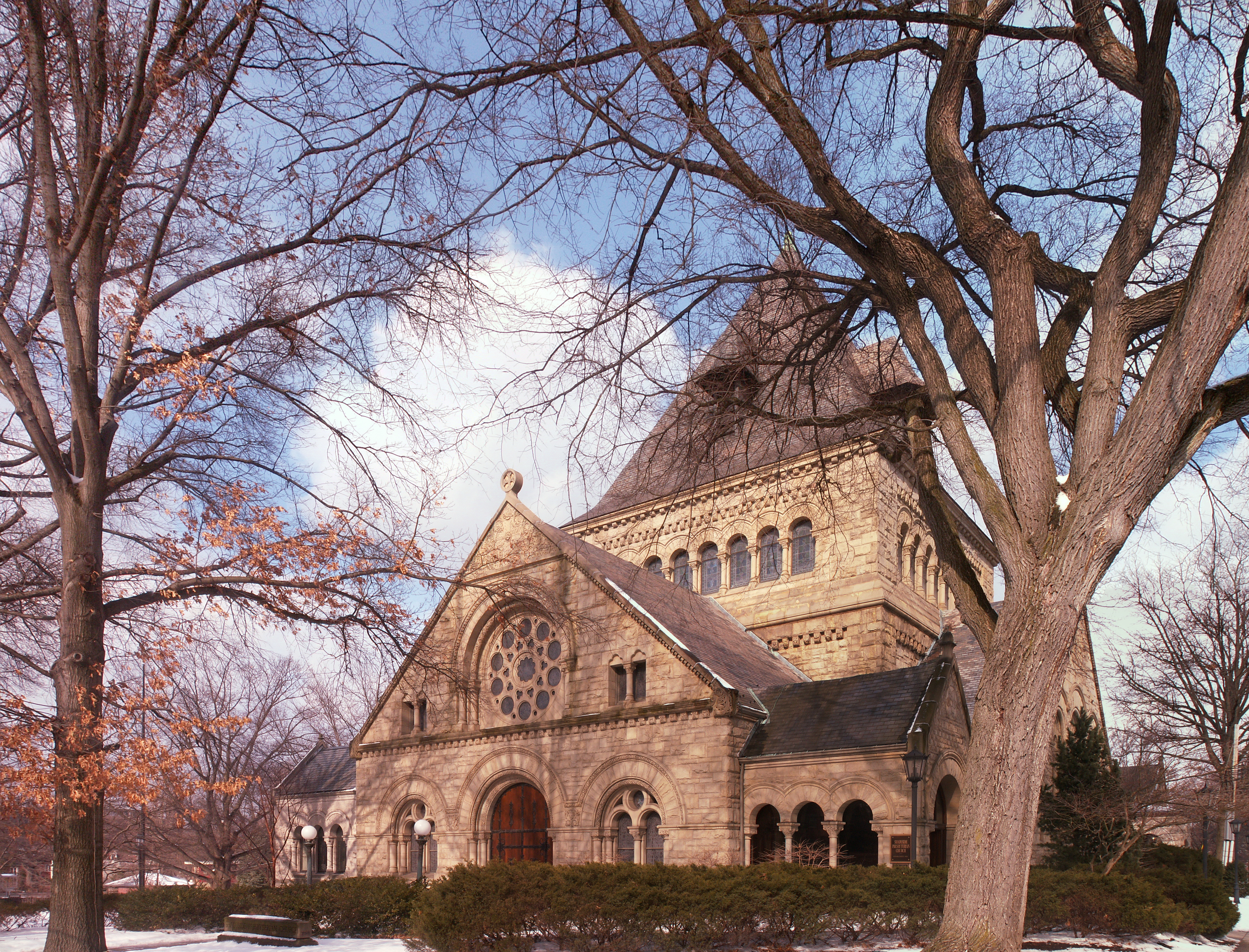

- Location within Pittsburgh Location within Pennsylvania Location within the United States
- Location: Amberson Ave. and Westminster Pl., Pittsburgh, Pennsylvania
- Coordinates: 40°26′57″N 79°56′21″W
- Built: 1890
- Architect: Shepley, Rutan & Coolidge
- Architectural style: Romanesque, Richardsonian Romanesque
- Website: www.shadysidepres.org
- NRHP reference No.: 75001613

Significant dates
- Added to NRHP: April 03, 1975
- Designated PHLF: 1971

Shadyside Presbyterian Church is a large congregation of the Presbyterian Church (U.S.A.) in an historic section of Pittsburgh, Pennsylvania, United States.

== History ==
Located at the corner of Amberson Avenue and Westminster Place in the Shadyside neighborhood of the city of Pittsburgh, the Shadyside Presbyterian Church was founded in 1866 as a congregation in the Presbyterian denomination. It has enjoyed a long history of local, national, and global recognition for its outreach, missions, and music. Distinctively formal, traditional, and liturgical, worship services are described as "Reformed and Reverential" with nods to the congregation's ancestral heritage in the Church of Scotland. The principal worship service is held at eleven o'clock on Sunday mornings.

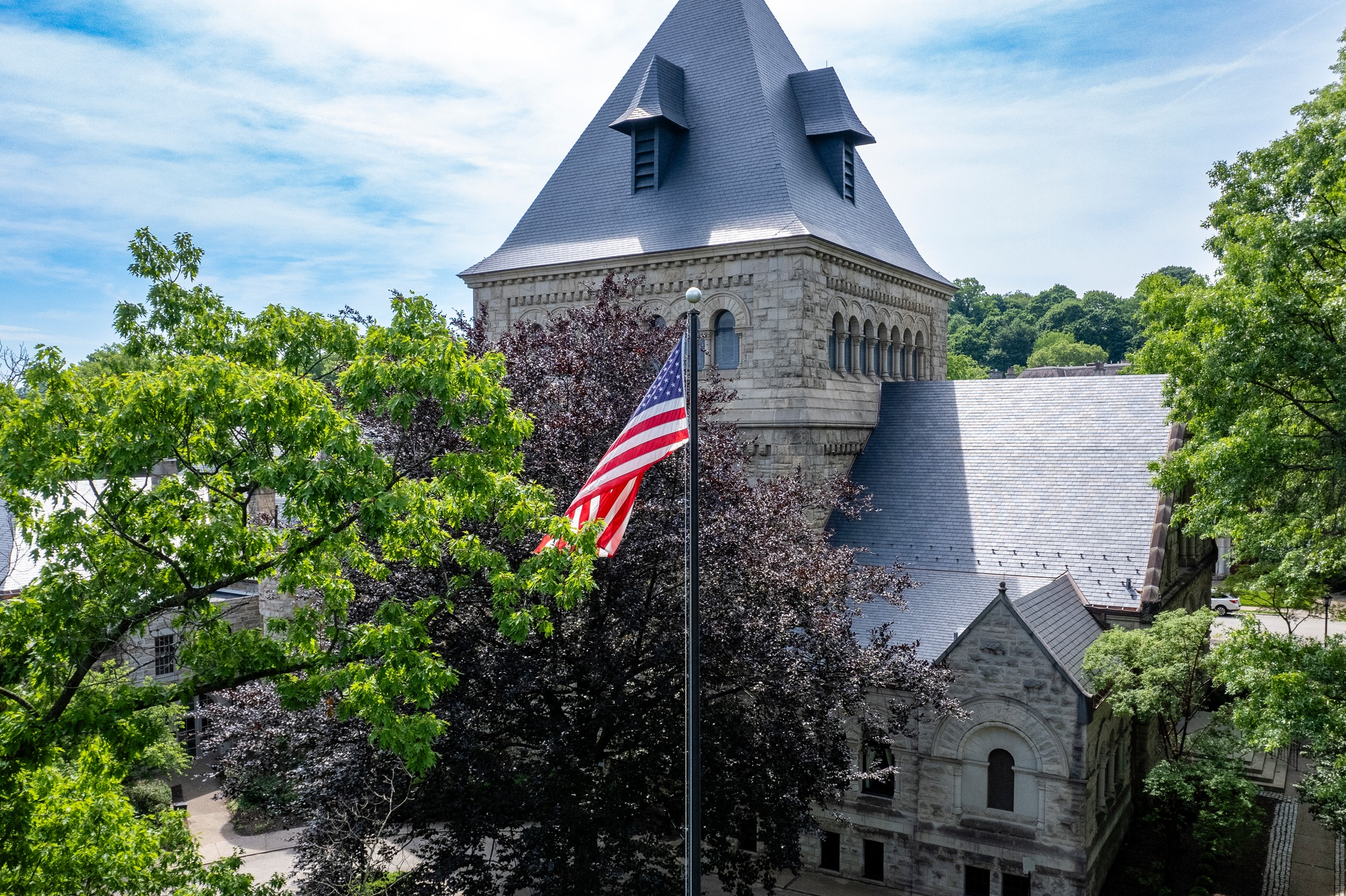
Aerial View

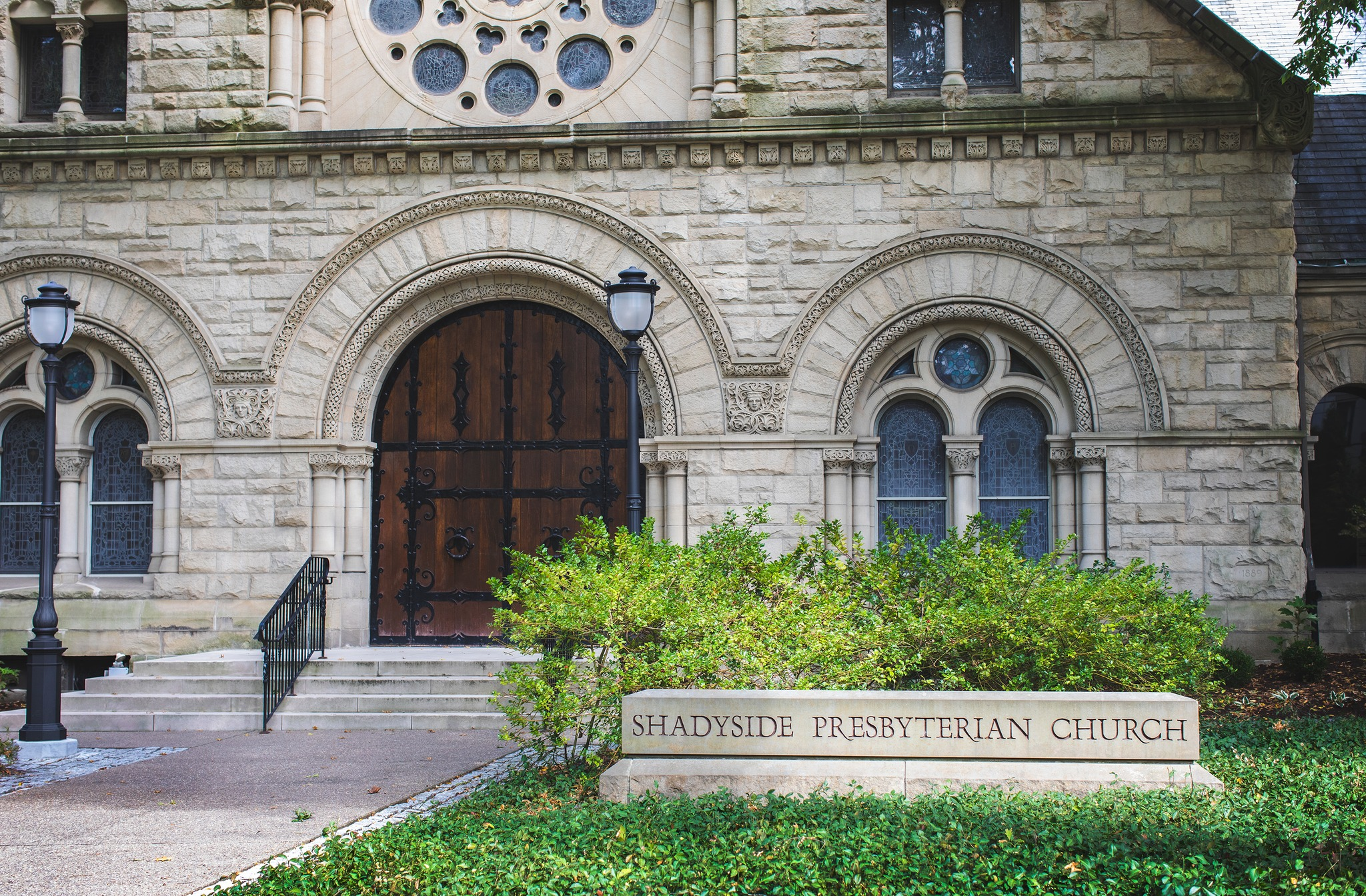
Entrance from Amberson Avenue

== Architecture ==
The Shadyside Church building, the congregation's third, is listed on the National Register of Historic Places as a prime example of Richardsonian Romanesque architecture. It was completed in 1890 to designs of American architectural firm Shepley, Rutan & Coolidge, the successor firm to H.H. Richardson's office. The resulting design heavily echoes that of Richardson's Trinity Church in Boston. The interior of the church underwent several alterations during its first forty-eight years; what is largely seen in the worship space today dates from a major renovation undertaken in 1938. Elements of note include windows by the Gorham Company of New York, Tiffany & Company of New York, and Rudy Brothers of Pittsburgh; intricately carved stone and woodwork throughout, and a prominent Byzantine mosaic by Rudolf Scheffler which fills the chancel apse. The church is built in the Protestant "auditorium-style" popular in the late nineteenth century, a result of stout transepts and a large, central lantern tower which form a Greek cross in plan. The building's dominating pyramidal roof, adorned with four dormers (architecturally referred to as "witches hat"), features prominently in the neighborhood skyline.

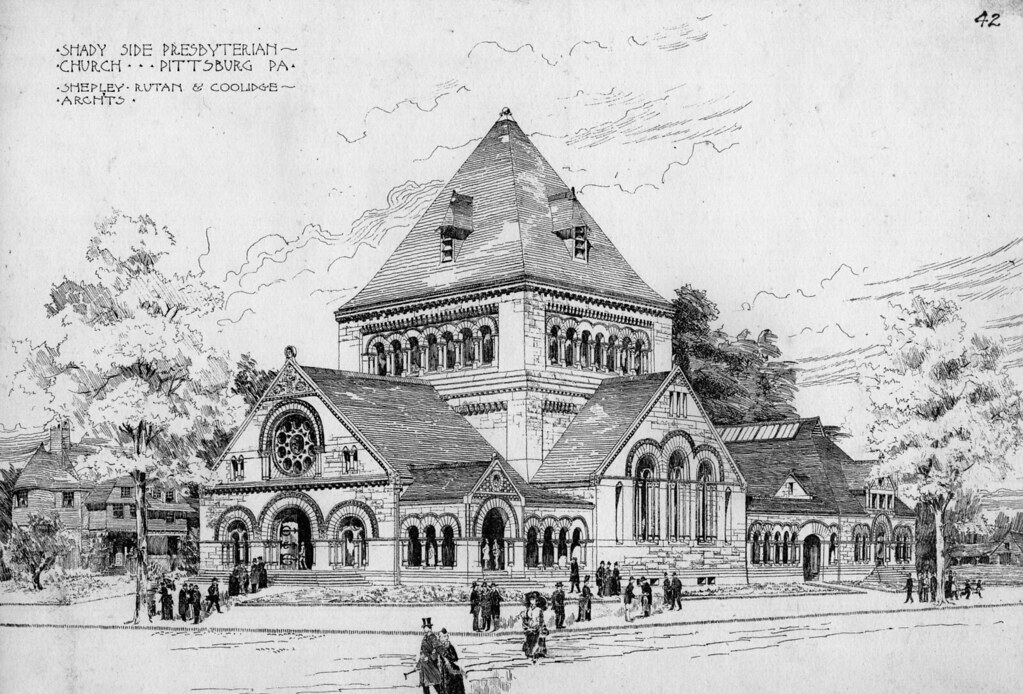
Third Shadyside Presbyterian Church building rendering c.1888, Shepley, Rutan & Coolidge, Boston

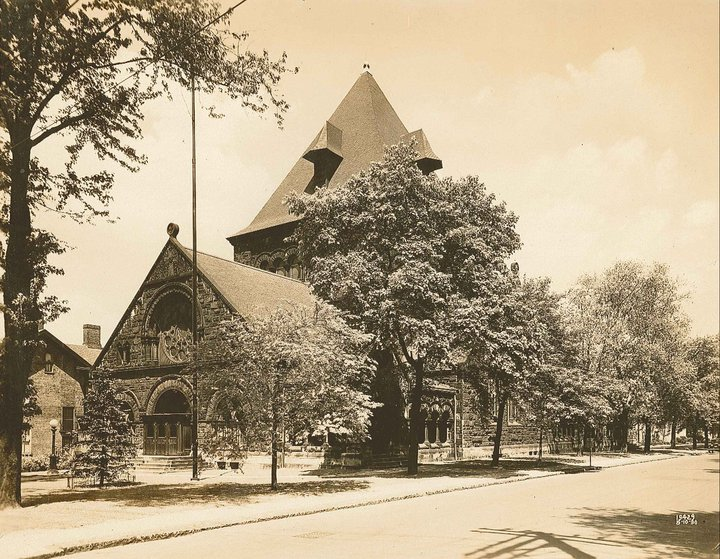
Early view of Shadyside Presbyterian Church

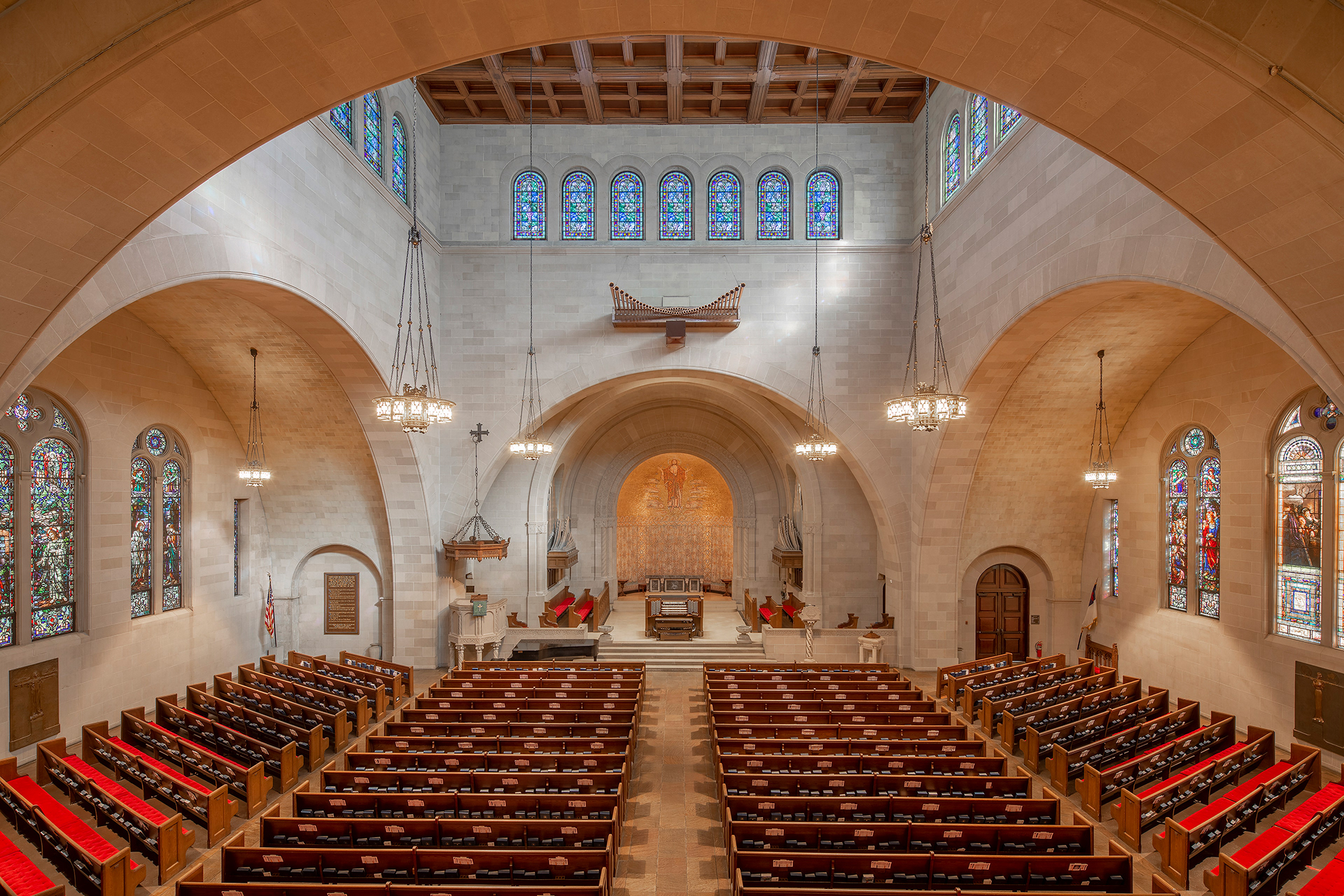
Interior of Sanctuary

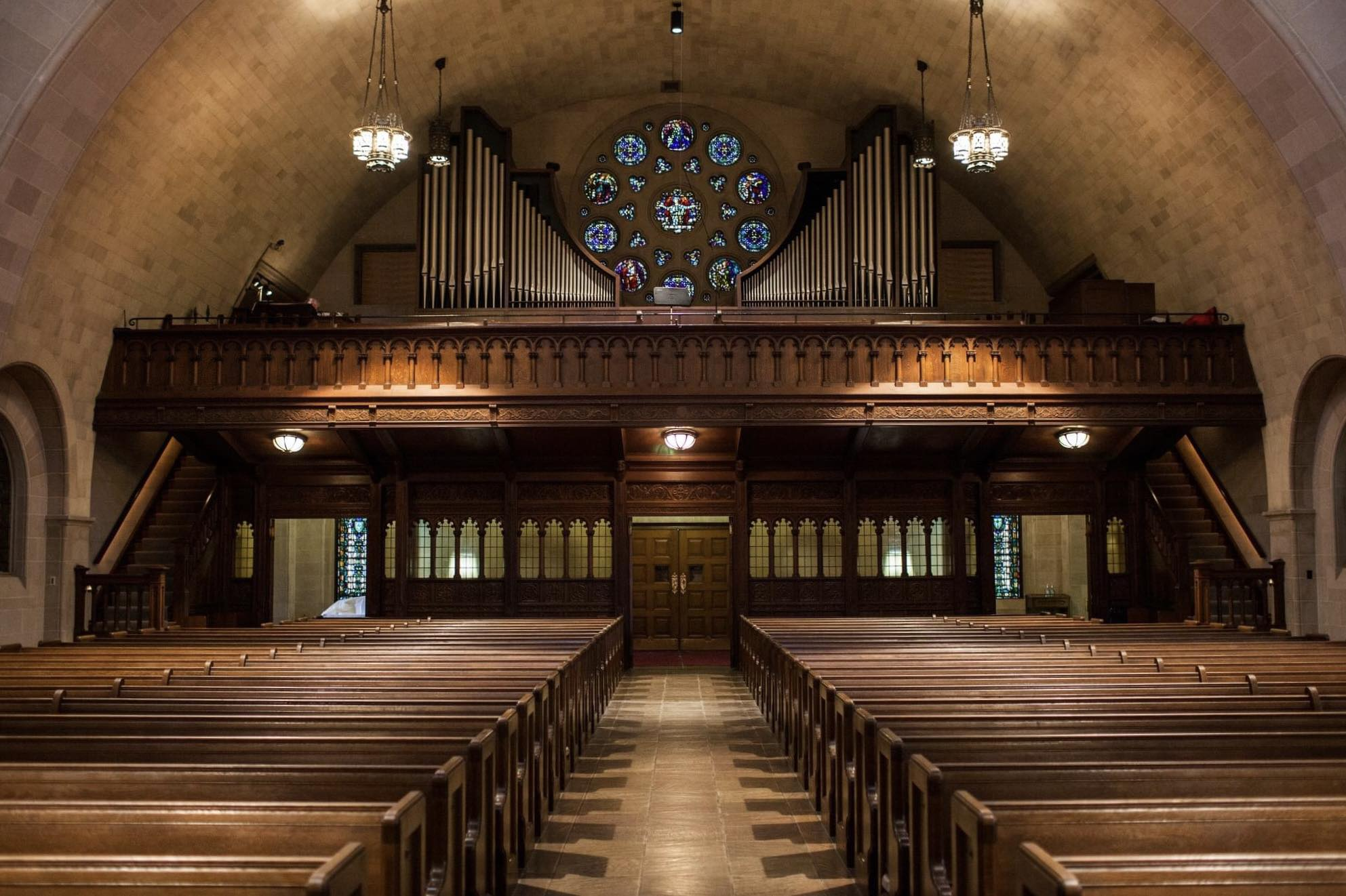
Rear Gallery

Building Dimensions

- Extreme Length (rose window to apse) = 127 feet (39 m)
- Extreme Width of Transepts = 85 feet (26 m)
- Height of Transepts = 35 feet (11 m)
- Length and Width of Lantern Tower = 52 feet (16 m)
- Height of Nave = 62 feet (19 m)
- Grade line to Pinnacle = 100 feet (30 m)
- Seating Capacity = 900 persons

First and Second Churches

Built on land gifted by Thomas Aiken, the first Shadyside church was built to Aiken's designs. Work began in 1866 and was completed in 1867. By the early 1870s, the first building proved too small and plans were made for a second, larger building on the same site. Despite an economic depression in 1873, a second church was built to the plans of James H. Windrom of Philadelphia. Ground was broken in 1874 and the new building dedicated in 1875 with the first church building being retained for use as a chapel. With seating for 700 to 800, the second church was "English Decorated Gothic" in style and included a tower with spire which rose 140 feet into the sky.

In the late 1880s, the second building was deemed too small for the growing congregation. Underground seepage of water from springs in the hillside caused some of the walls and tower to be determined unsafe. On April 8, 1888, the second church was declared unsafe for use and the congregation voted to replace the structure with a new church and chapel, engaging the firm Shepley, Rutan and Coolidge of Boston.

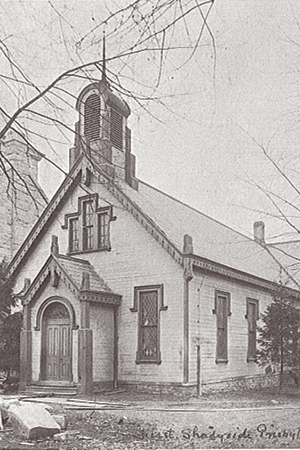
First church building, c.1866.

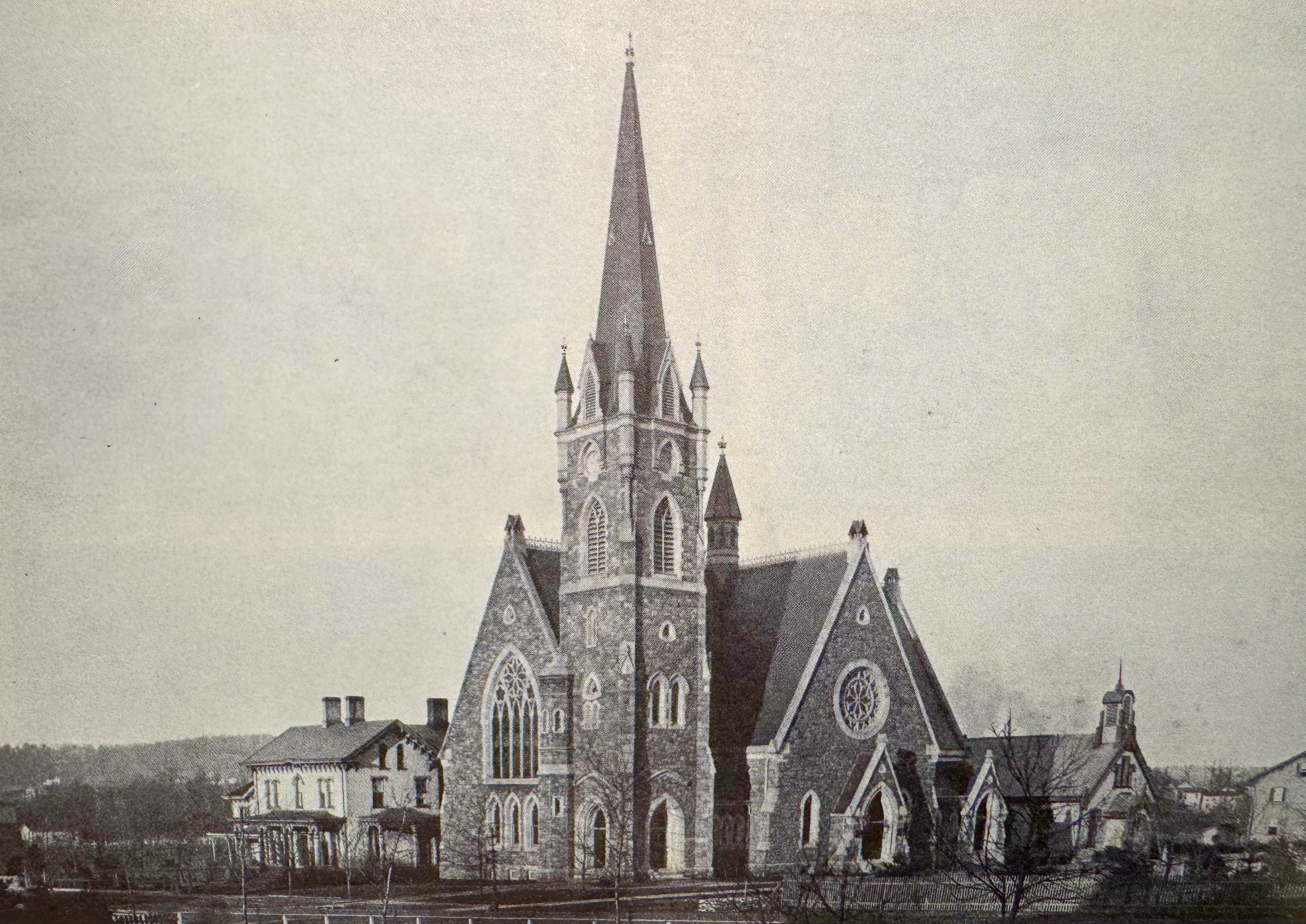
Second church building (1875-1888) with first building to its right (1866); the first manse to the left.

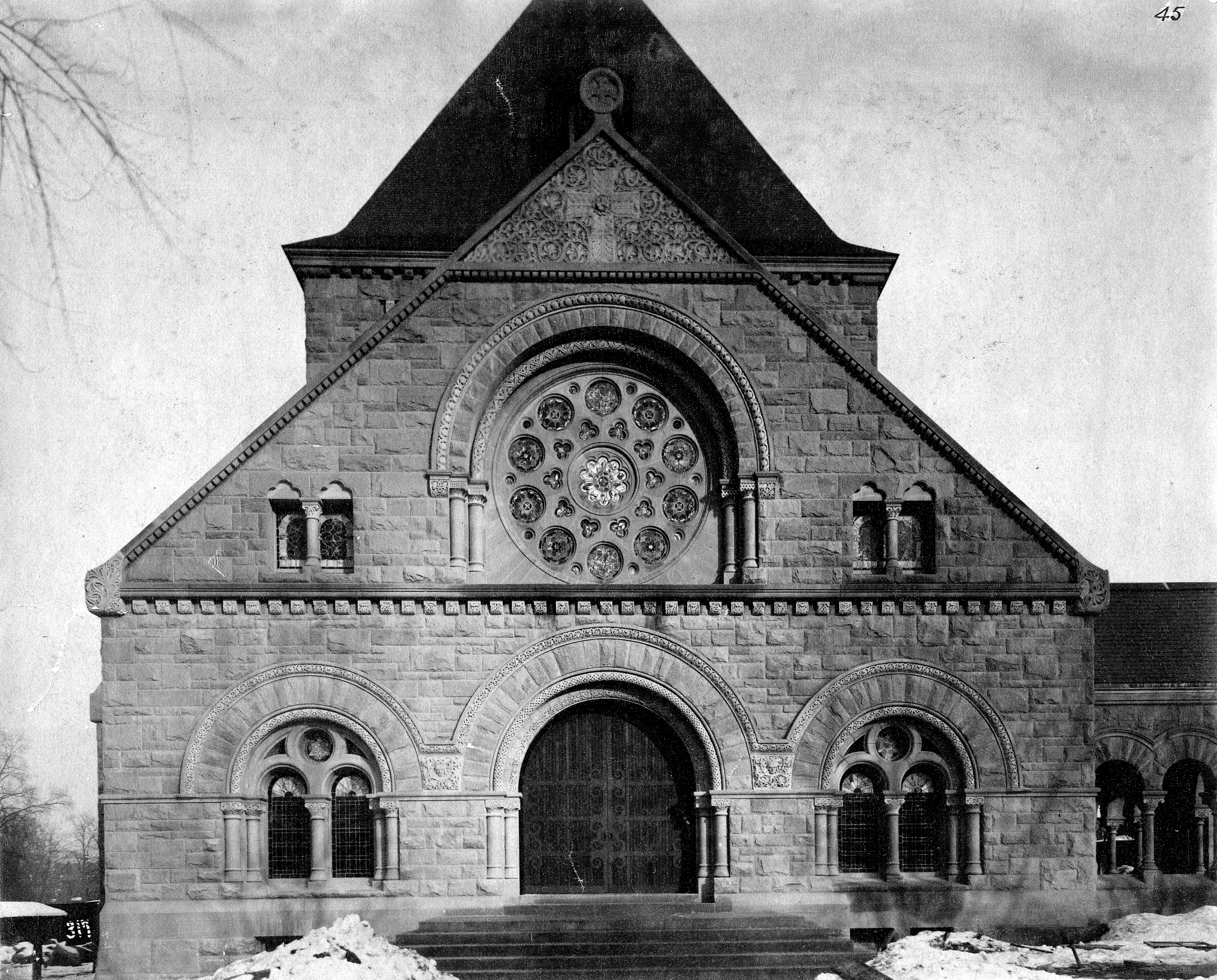
Third and current building; west entrance and elevation, c.1890.

Additions and Renovations

The first addition to the new Shadyside church was its chapel, completed two years after the church in 1892. The gallery and narthex were renovated in 1920 as a memorial to Wallace H. Rowe.

A Parish Hall was added to the northeast side of the church in 1953 to the plans of the Pittsburgh firm of Hoffman and Crumpton. The addition included a gathering hall-gymnasium, stage, classrooms, and kitchen.

An addition known as the "Scharfe Wing" was built in 1981 to the north of the Amberson Avenue entrance. It included restrooms and a large space designated for education. In 2009, the congregation undertook substantial renovations to all spaces except the main sanctuary. The five-phase project included office renovations, enclosing the existing exterior cloister and atrium, and converting the 1953 gathering hall-gymnasium to a formal Parish Hall.

In 2023, after several years of roof leaks and crumbling tiles, the monumental task of replacing the 1890 slate roof was begun, a project which lasted ten months. The replacement roof with lifespan of 75–100 years renews the dark slate of the original roof.

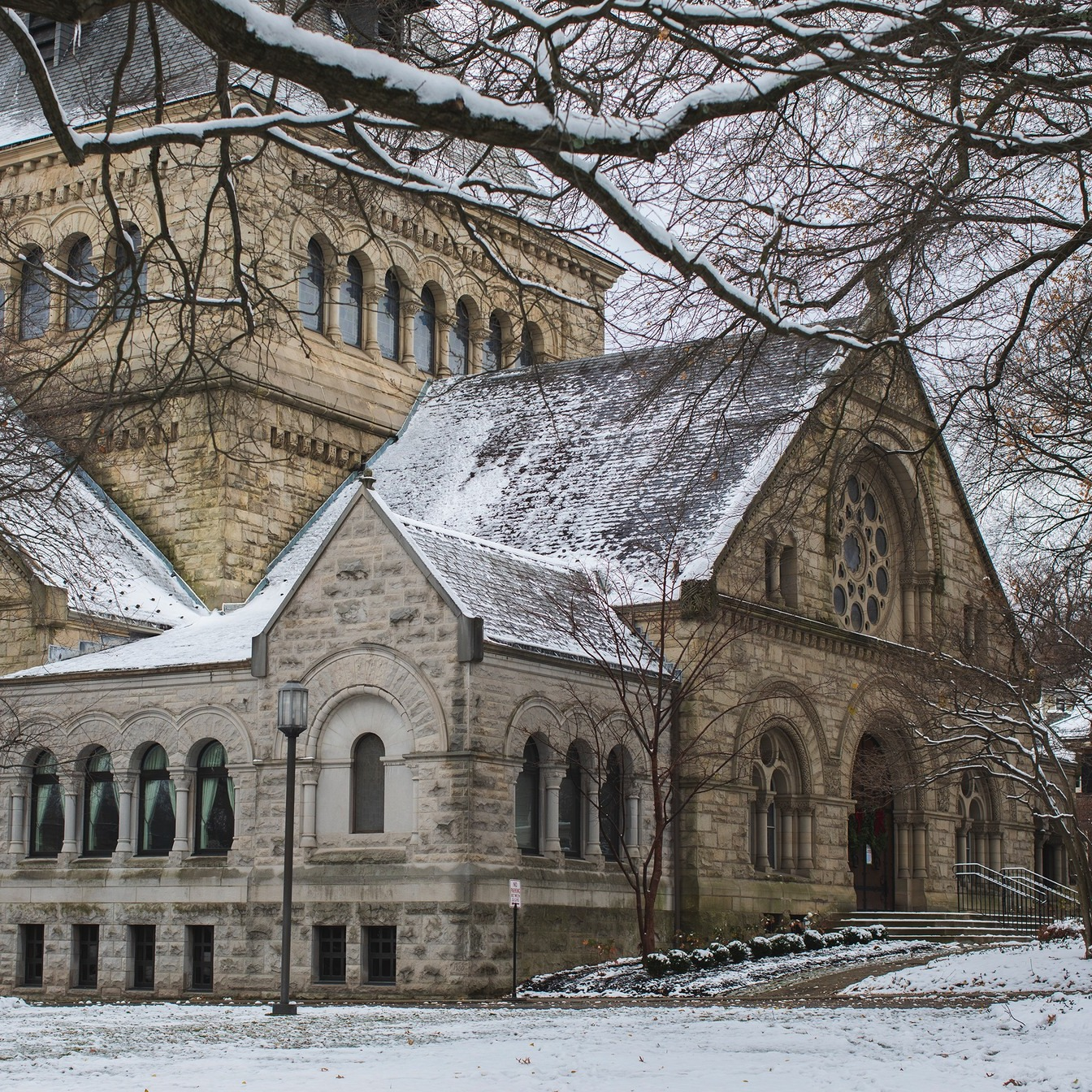
Detail of Scharfe Wing added in 1981.

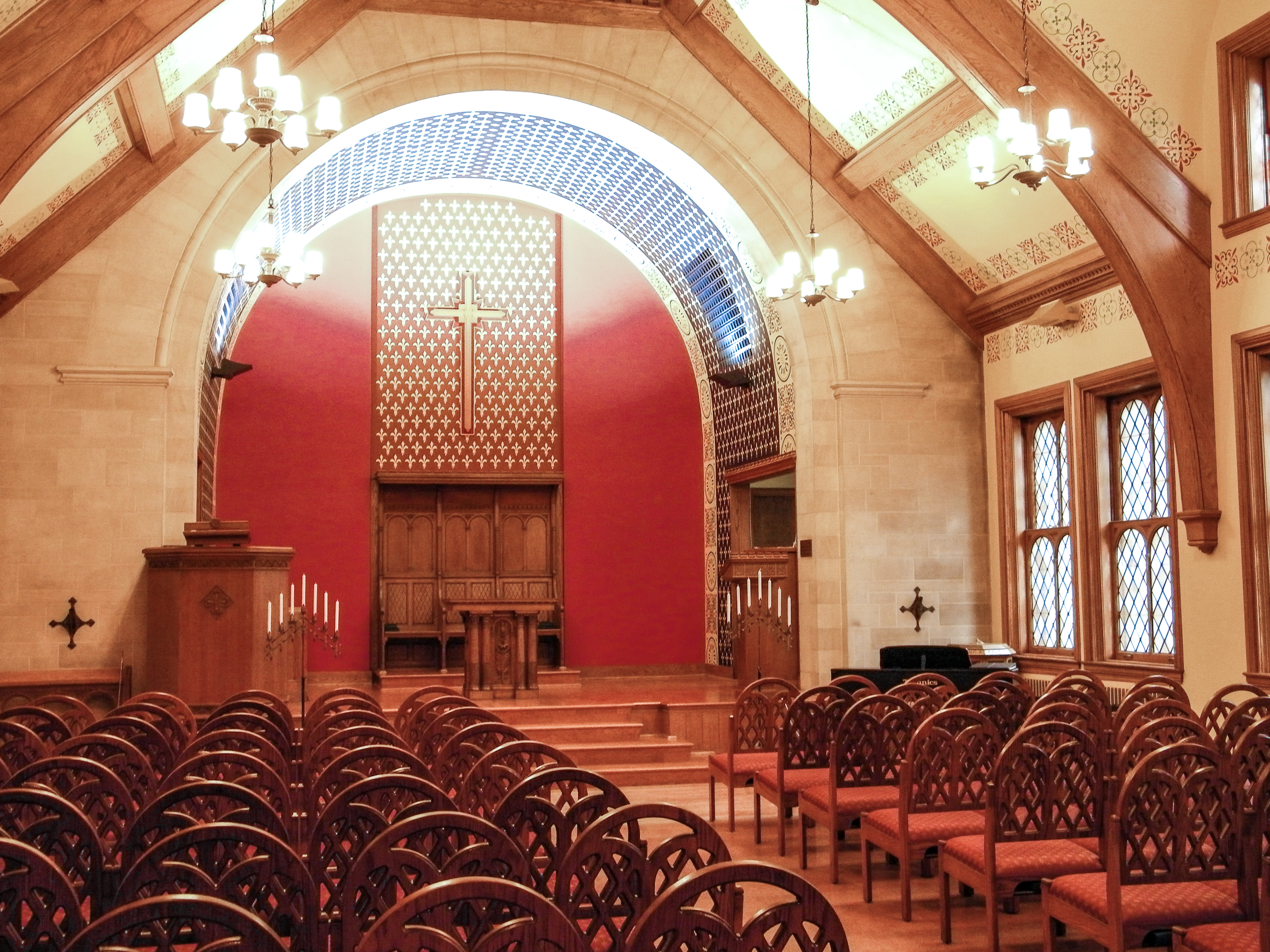
Chapel following restoration.

== Pastors ==
Throughout its long history, the church has been served by a succession of notable preachers, including Hugh Thomson Kerr, Sr., Robert Cleveland Holland, Howard C. Scharfe, and F. Morgan Roberts. In 1916, during his pastorate, Hugh Thomson Kerr, Sr. penned the text for the well-known hymn, "God of Our Life, Through All the Circling Years" set to the tune Sandon. Between 2003 and 2012, the congregation had as its senior pastor M. Craig Barnes, noted author and speaker, and professor at Pittsburgh Theological Seminary, until his election as president of Princeton Theological Seminary. The Rev. John Allan Dalles, a well-known hymn writer, Pittsburgh native, and graduate of Pittsburgh Theological Seminary, was the church's Interim Senior Minister and Head of Staff, 2019–2021. The current pastor, the twelfth in the church's history, is the Reverend Austin Crenshaw Shelley.

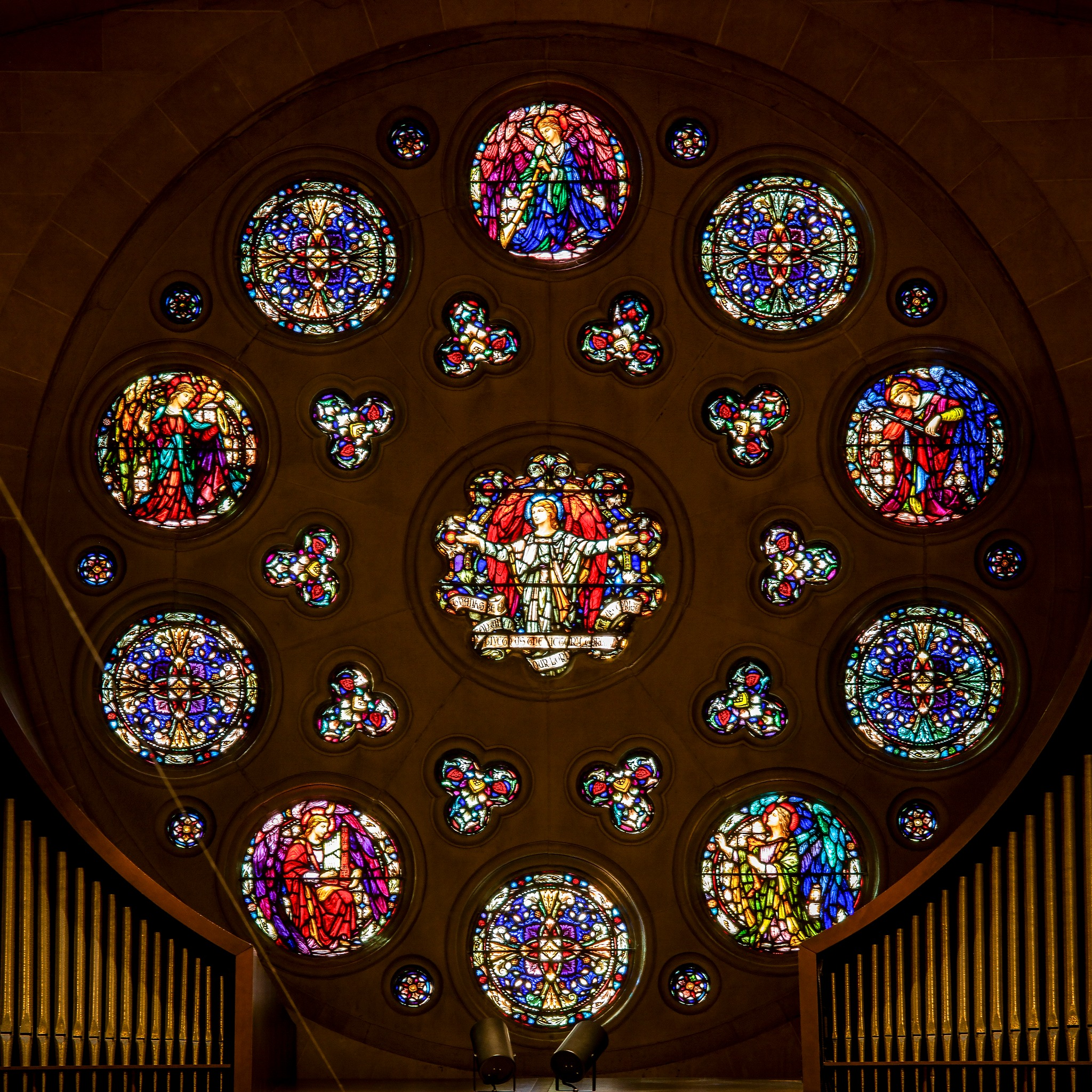
Gallery Rose Window

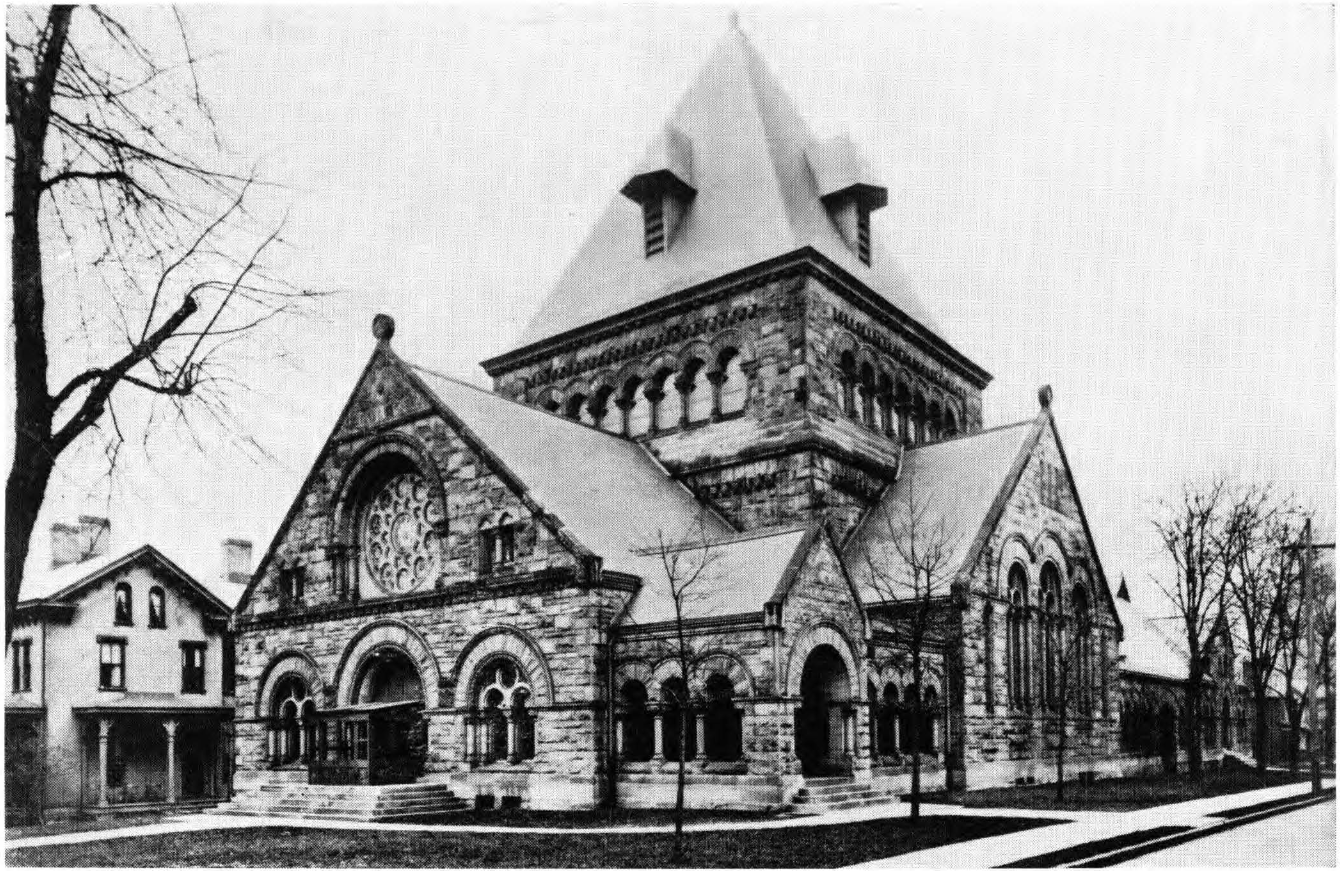
Amberson Avenue and Westminster Place, c.1906.

Senior Pastorates of the Shadyside Presbyterian Church:

- William Trimble Beatty, D.D. (1867-1881)
- John Morville Richmond, D.D. (1881-1888)
- Richard Sill Holmes, D.D. (1890-1904)
- J. Kinsey Smith, D.D. (1905-1910)
- Hugh Thomson Kerr, D.D., L.L.D., S.T.D. (1913-1945)
- Howard Carman Scharfe, D.D., L.L.D. (1945-1971)
- Robert Cleveland Holland, D.D., D.H.L., D.Litt. (1972-1983)
- F. Morgan Roberts, D.D., D.H.L. (1985-1994)
- Peter Corey Bower, D.Min. (1996-1998)
- M. Craig Barnes, Ph.D. (2003-2012)
- Conrad C. Sharps, D.H.L. (2014-2018)
- Austin Crenshaw Shelley, Ph.D. cand. (2021–present)

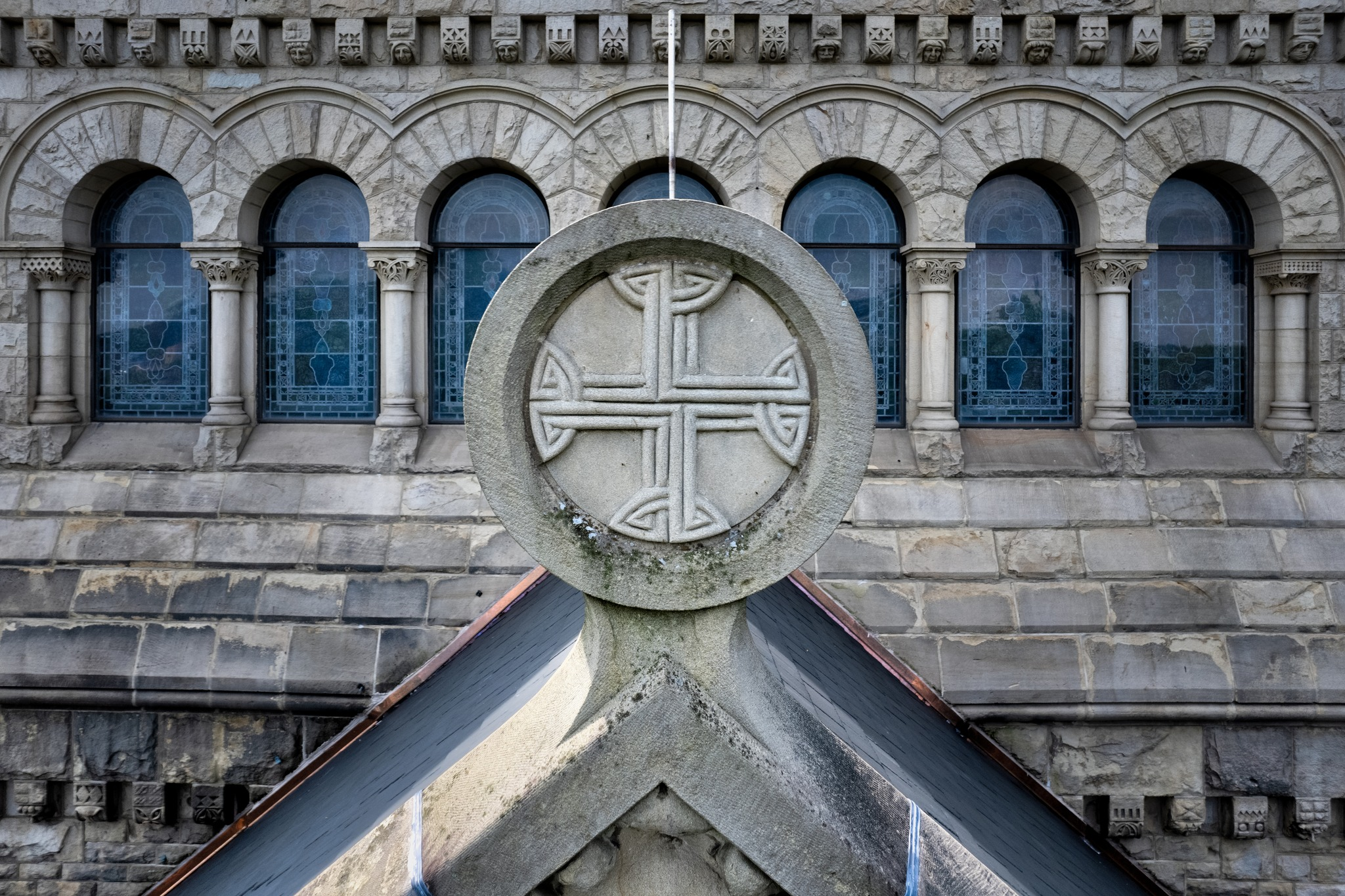
Exterior Cross

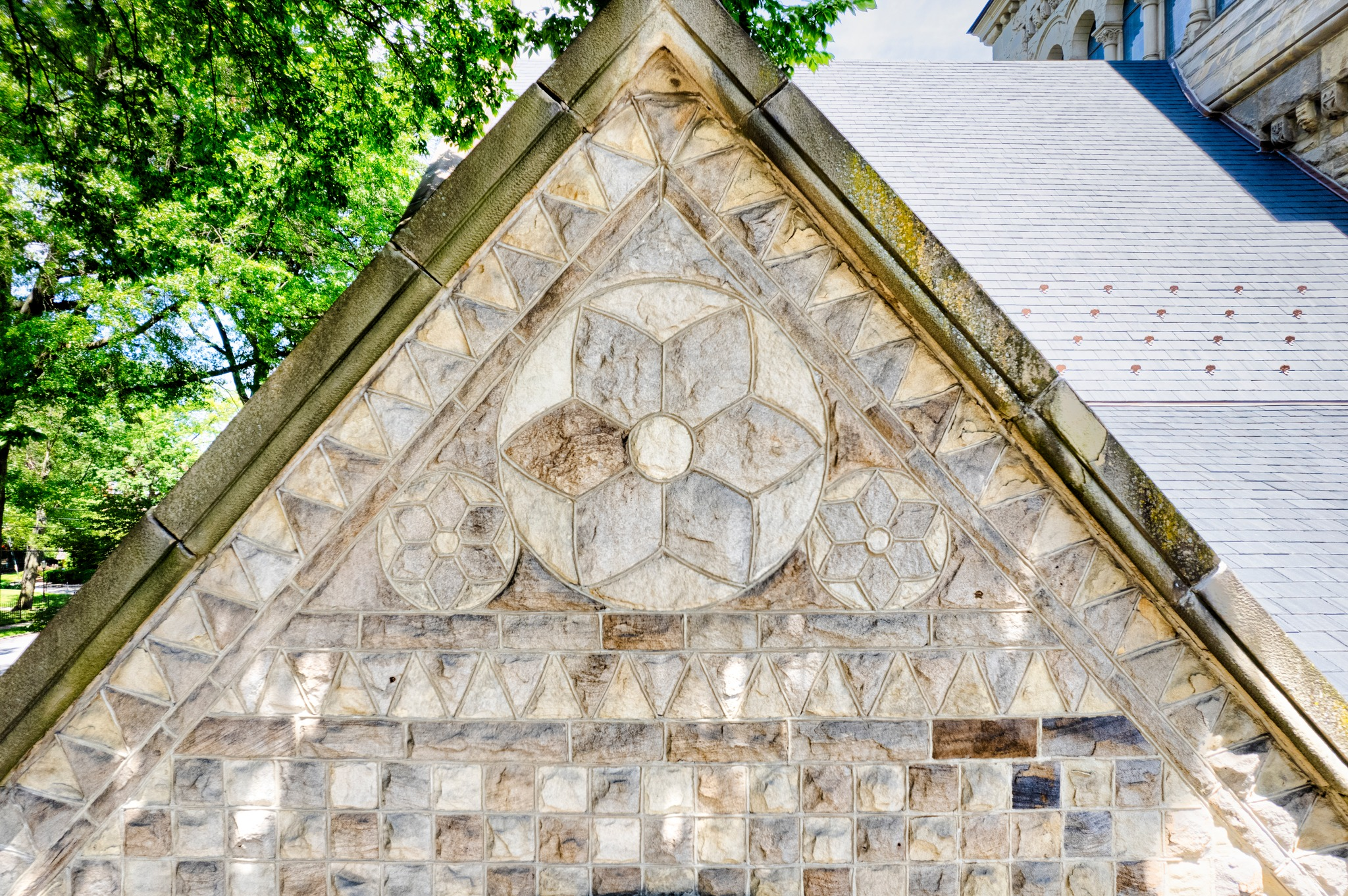
Exterior Stonework

== World Communion Sunday and Radio Ministry ==
It was at Shadyside Church in 1933 that the now global practice of celebrating World Communion Sunday on the first Sunday in October was originated, under the leadership of the Rev. Hugh Thomson Kerr. A commemorative medal was installed in the chancel floor as a memorial to elder C. Stanton Belfour (1906-1969). Shadyside also was the first church anywhere to pioneer regular radio broadcasts of its worship services on KDKA radio and was the first church to broadcast worship services to both the North Pole and to the South Pole.

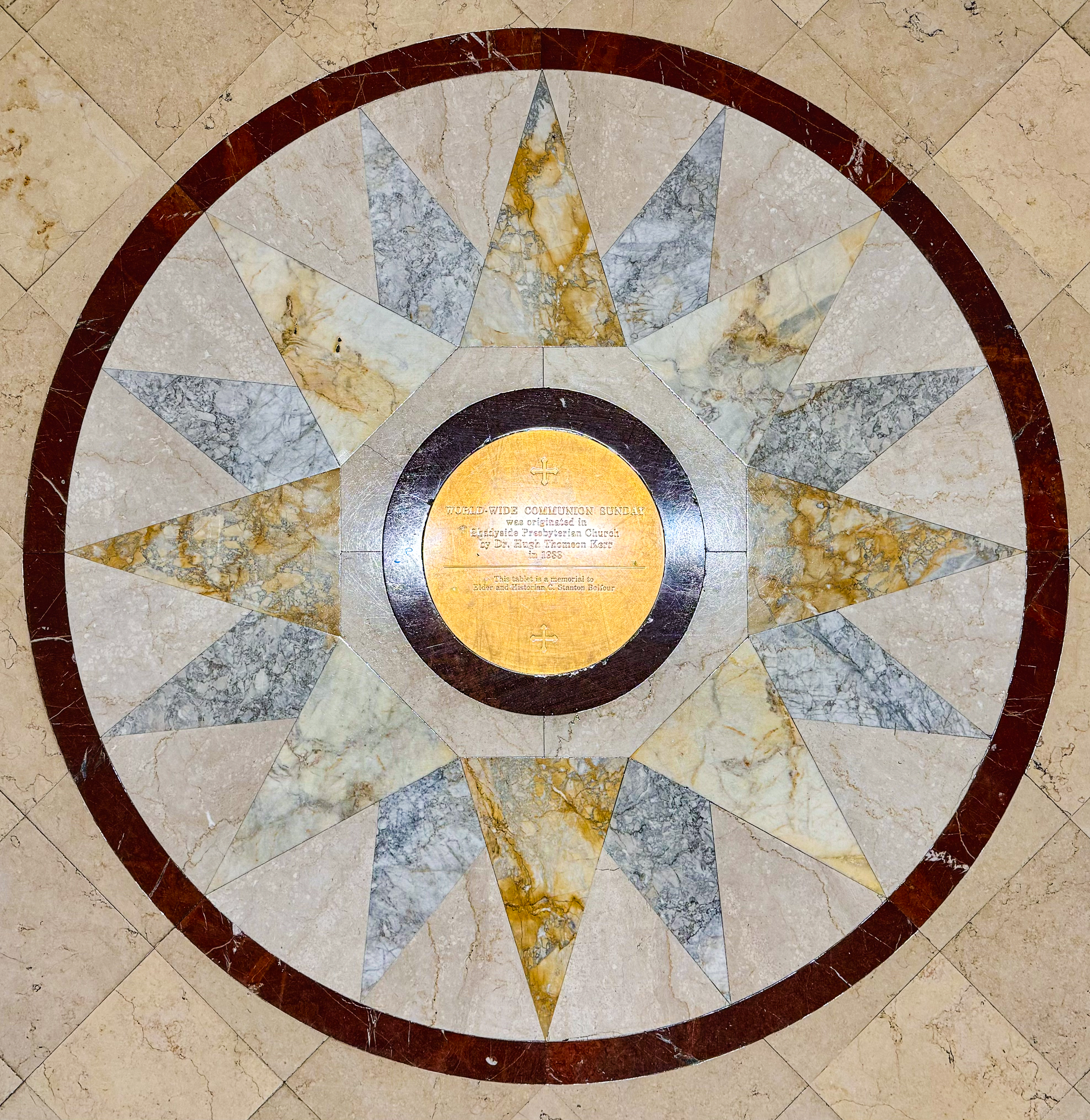
Chancel floor medallion commemorating World Communion Sunday.

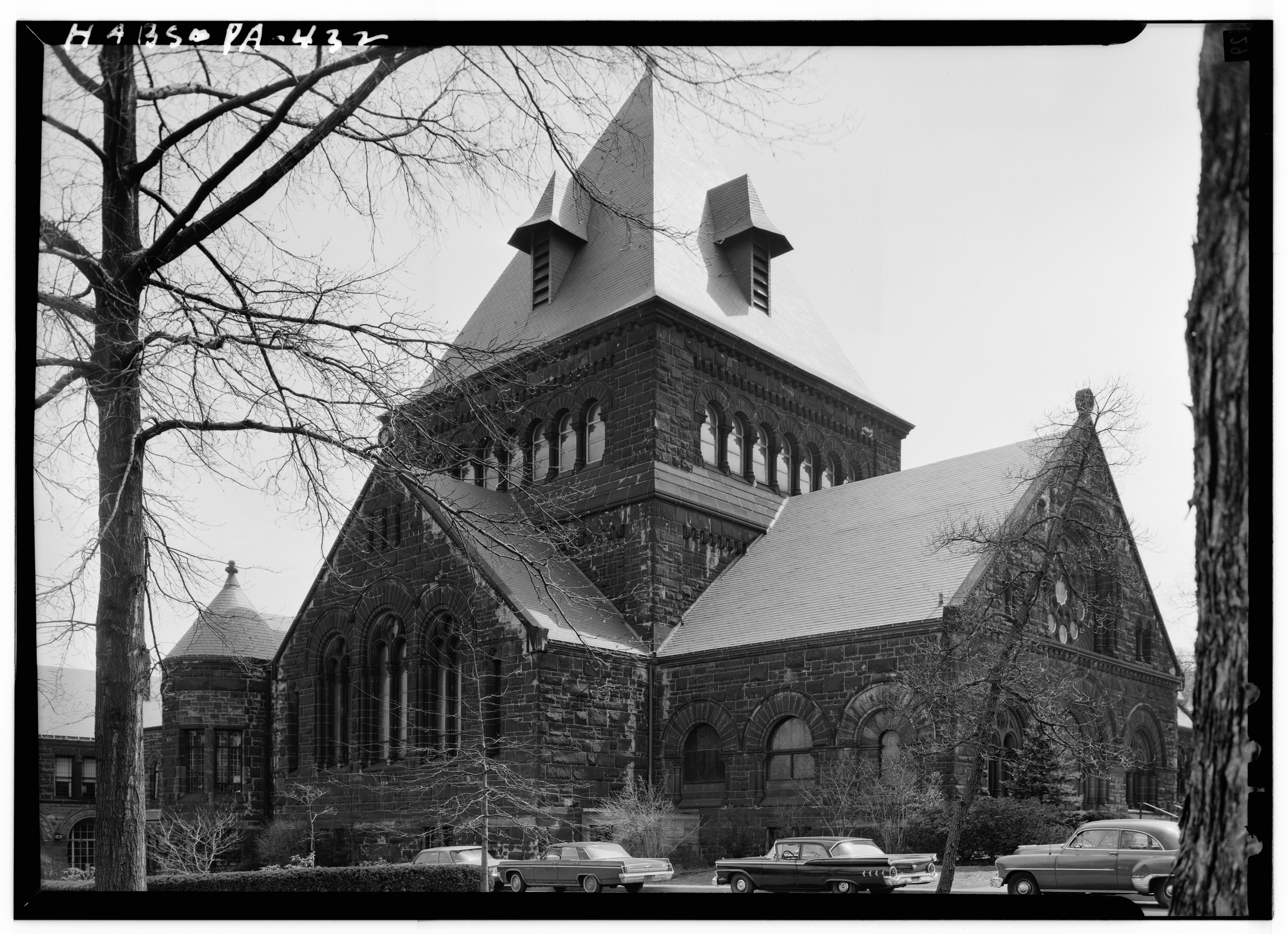
Historical photo from 1963, the congregation's 100th anniversary.

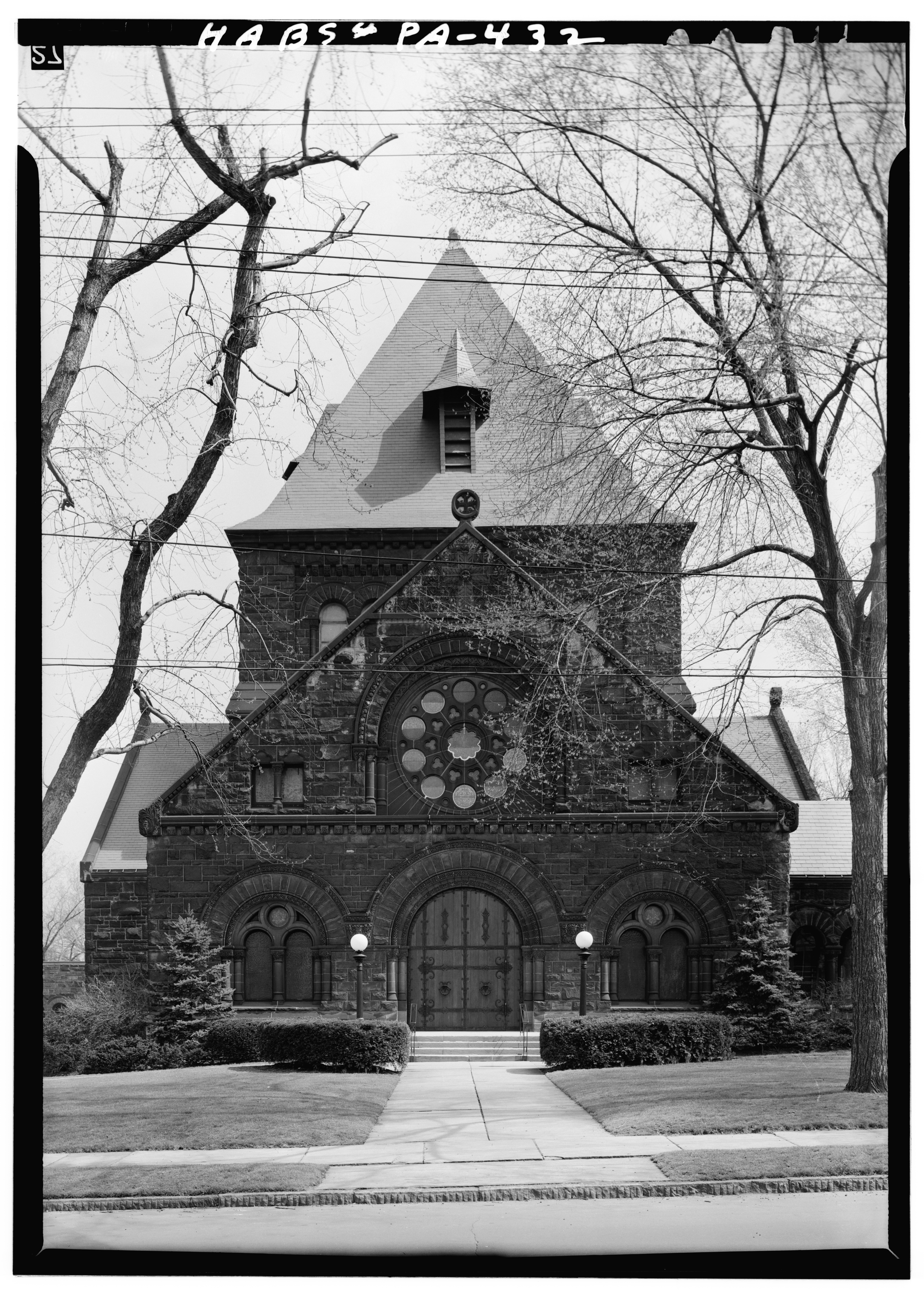
Historical photo from 1963, the congregation's 100th anniversary.

== Music ==
The music program, under the direction of Dr. Mark A. Anderson, is renowned for its semi-professional Chancel Choir, four-manual Reuter pipe organ, and celebrated concert series, Music in a Great Space. Several album recordings are available through the church office.

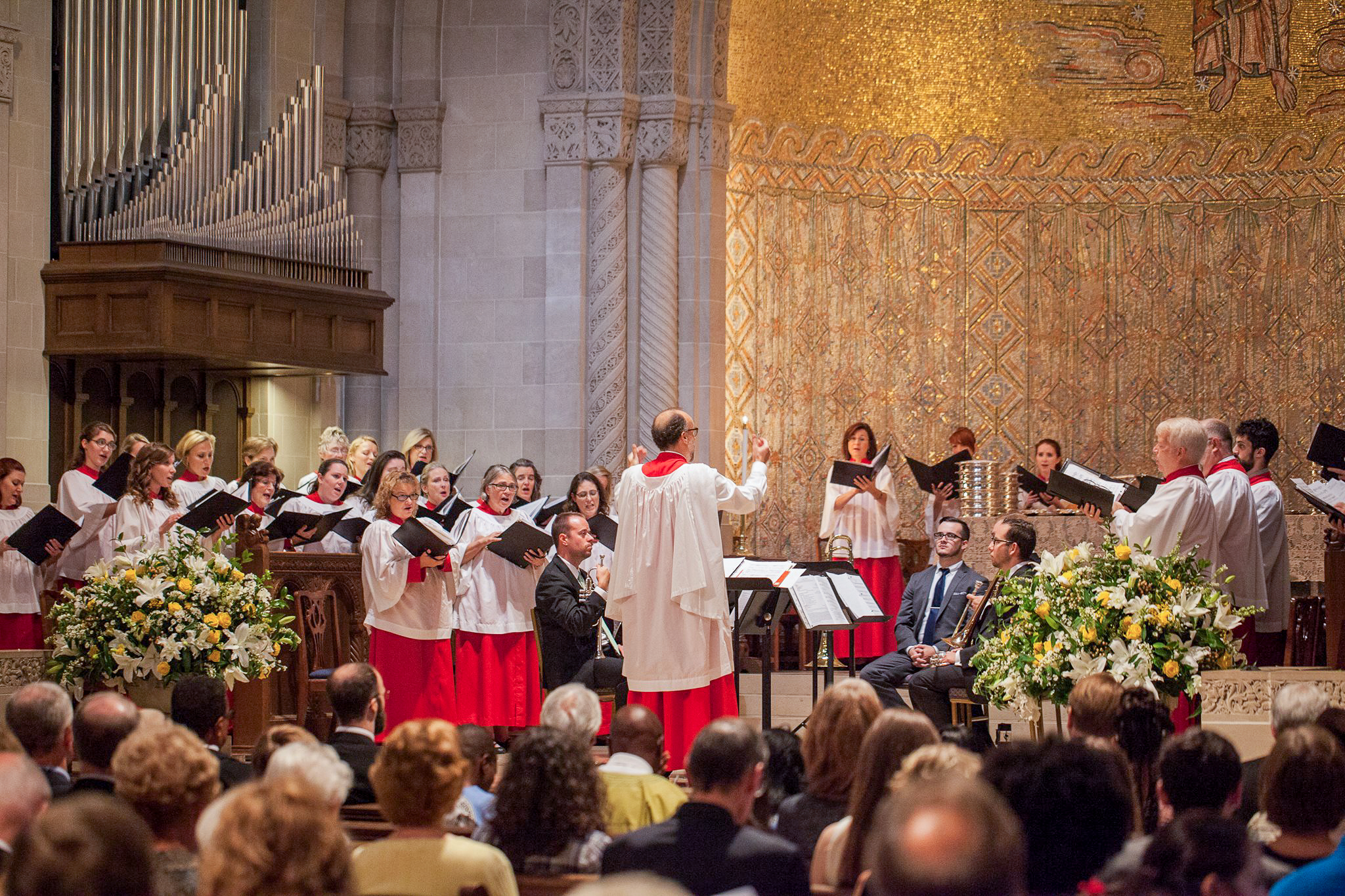
The Shadyside Chancel Choir under the direction of Dr. Mark A. Anderson.

Directors of Music

- Robert Pitcairn (1867-1869)
- Unknown (1869-1882)
- J.P. McCollum (1882-1890)
- Samuel M. Brown (1891)
- Joseph Gittings (1902-1906)
- William H. Oetting (1906-1911)
- Herman H. Fleer (1911-1917)
- Walter Wild (1917-1919)
- Earl Mitchell (1919-1935)
- Russell G. Wichmann (1936-1987)
- J. David Hart (1987-1991)
- Dudley Oakes, interim (1991-1992)
- John C. Walker (1992-2004)
- J. Christopher Pardini (2004-2010)
- Mark A. Anderson (2011–present)

== Organs ==
The Reuter organ, Op. 2175 (1994), occupying the chancel today is the congregation's fifth instrument. Significant tonal and restoration work was completed 2020-2023. Previous instruments include:

- Hook and Hastings (1875; built for second church - 3 manuals, 23 stops, 27 ranks)
- Kimball, Op. 475 (1903; rebuild of Hook and Hastings)
- Skinner, Op. 585 (1926; modified in 1937 - 4 manuals, 45 stops, 44 ranks)
- Möller, Op. 9030 (1957; 4 manuals, 77 stops, 67 ranks)
- Möller, Op. A-9030 (1973; Gallery addition - 2 manuals, 29 stops, 27 ranks)
- Möller, R-202 (1990; rebuild of Op. 9030 - 4 manuals, 84 stops, 85 ranks)
- Reuter, Op. 2175 (1994; 4 manuals, 170 stops, 105 ranks)

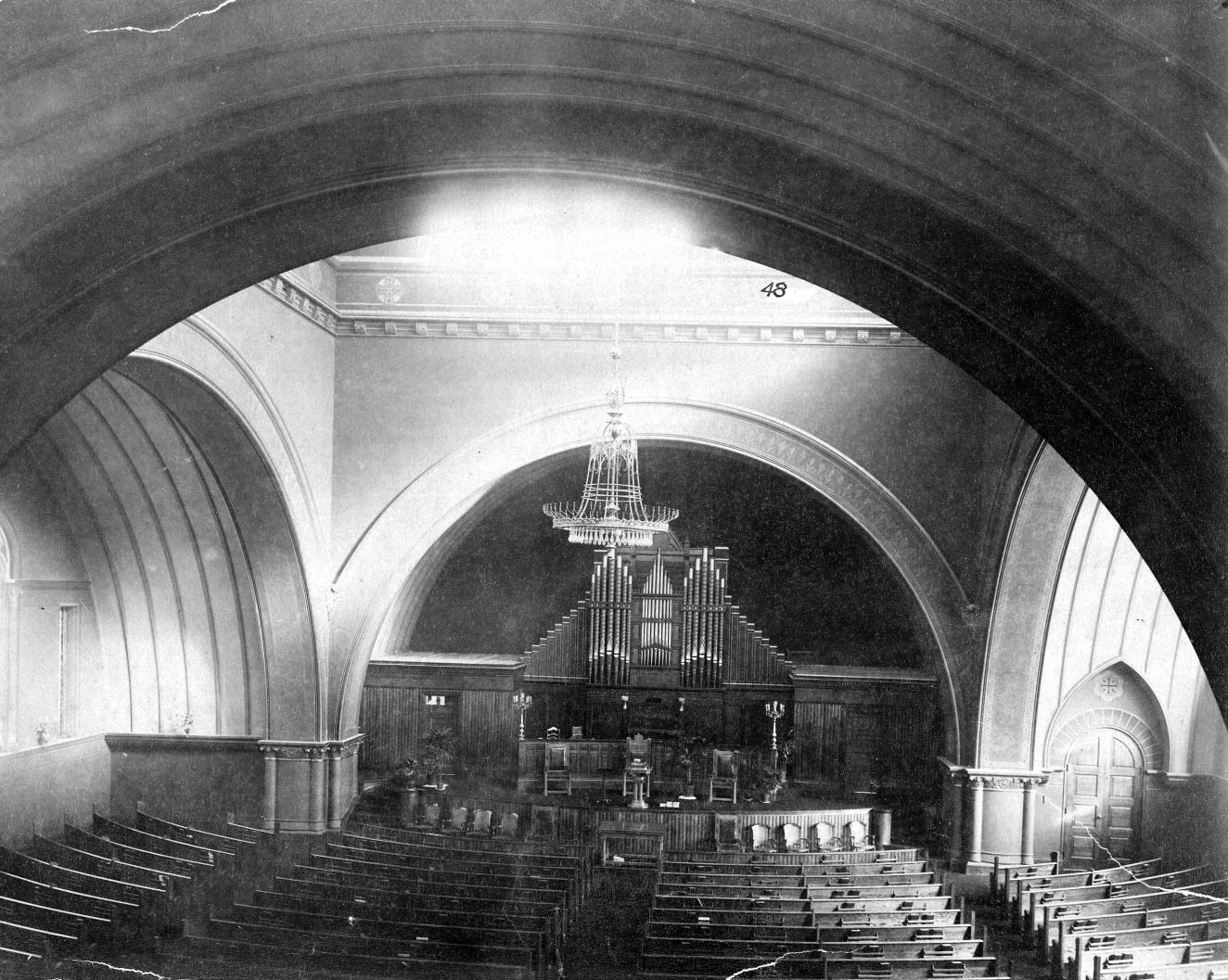
Hook and Hastings (1875) in 1890 sanctuary.

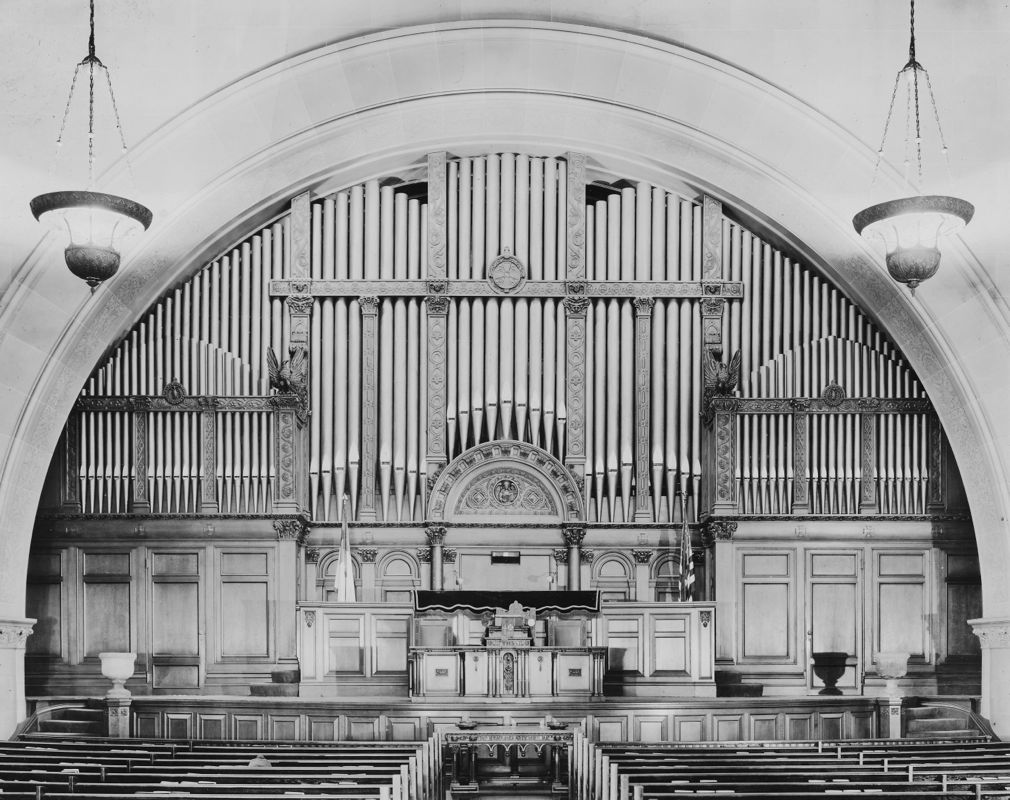
Kimball, Op. 475 (1903)

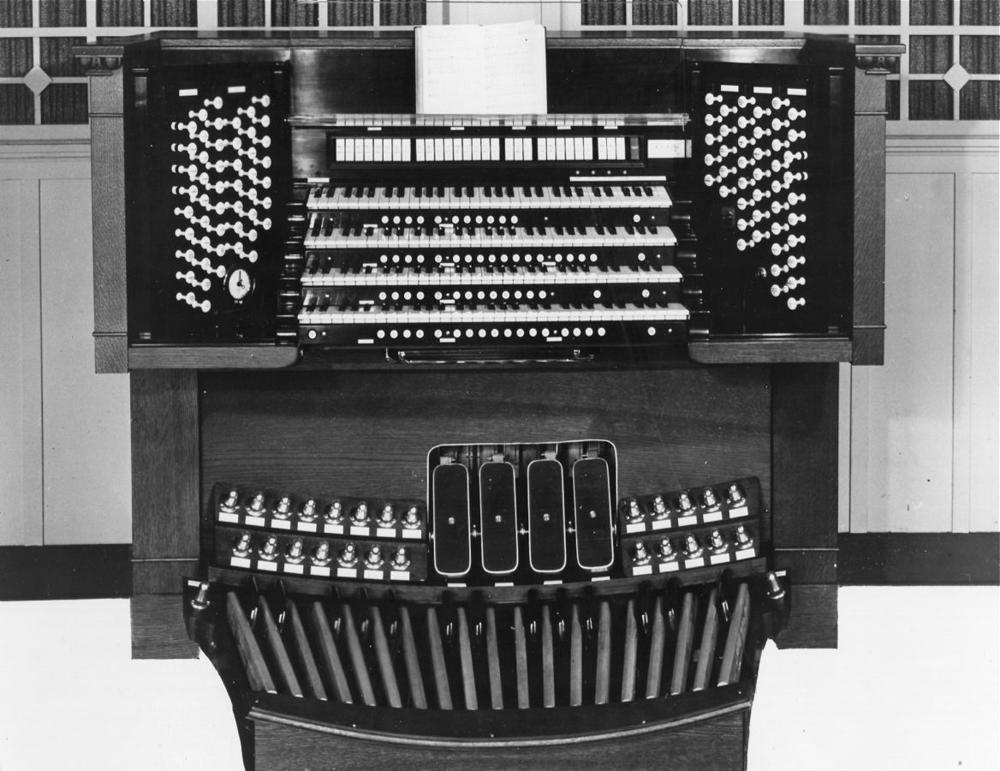
Möller, Op. 9030 (1957) Console

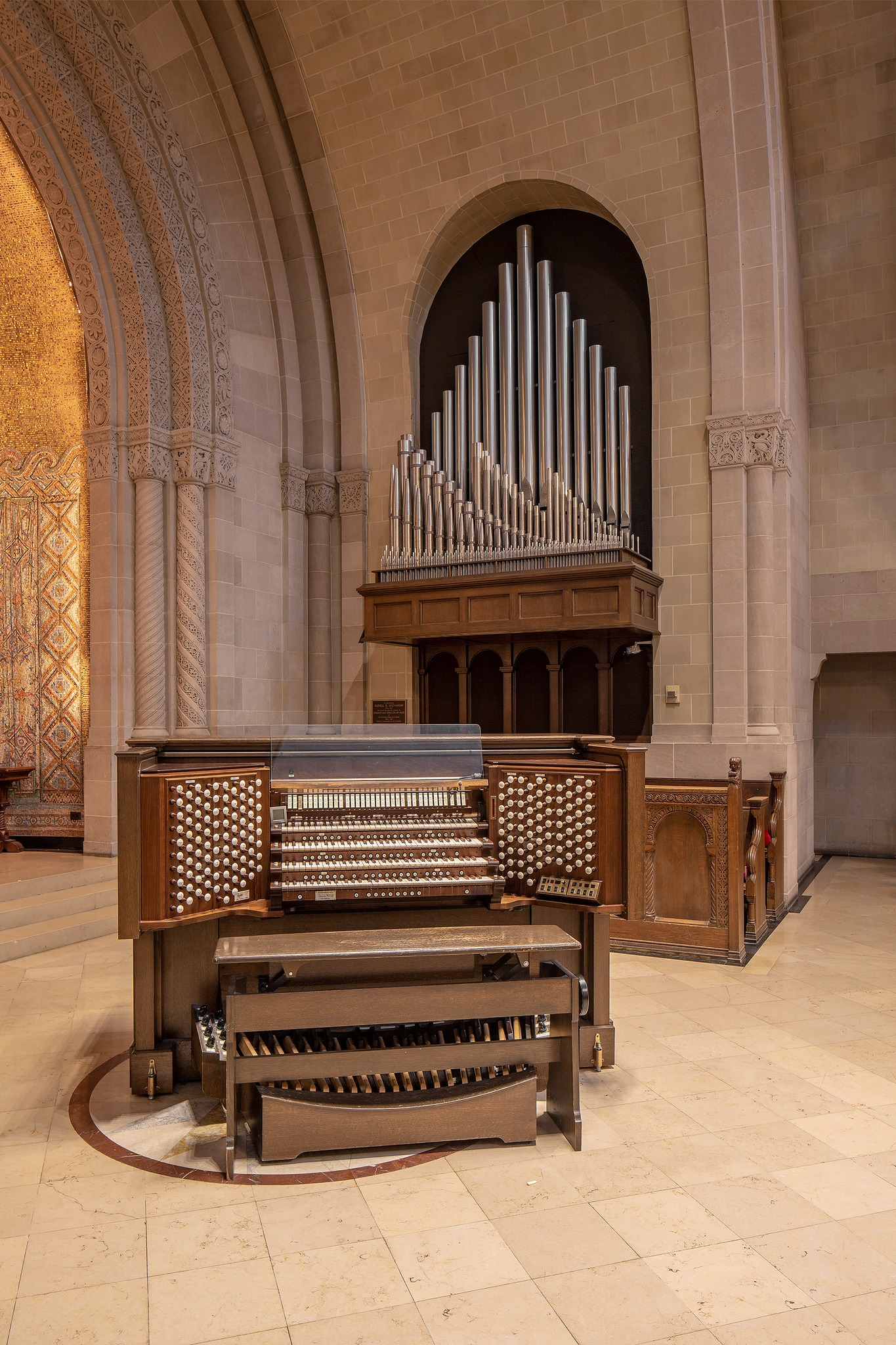
Reuter, Op. 2175 (1994) Console and exposed Great division.

Chapel Organs

- Möller, Op. 10264 (1966)
- Walker Digital (2003)

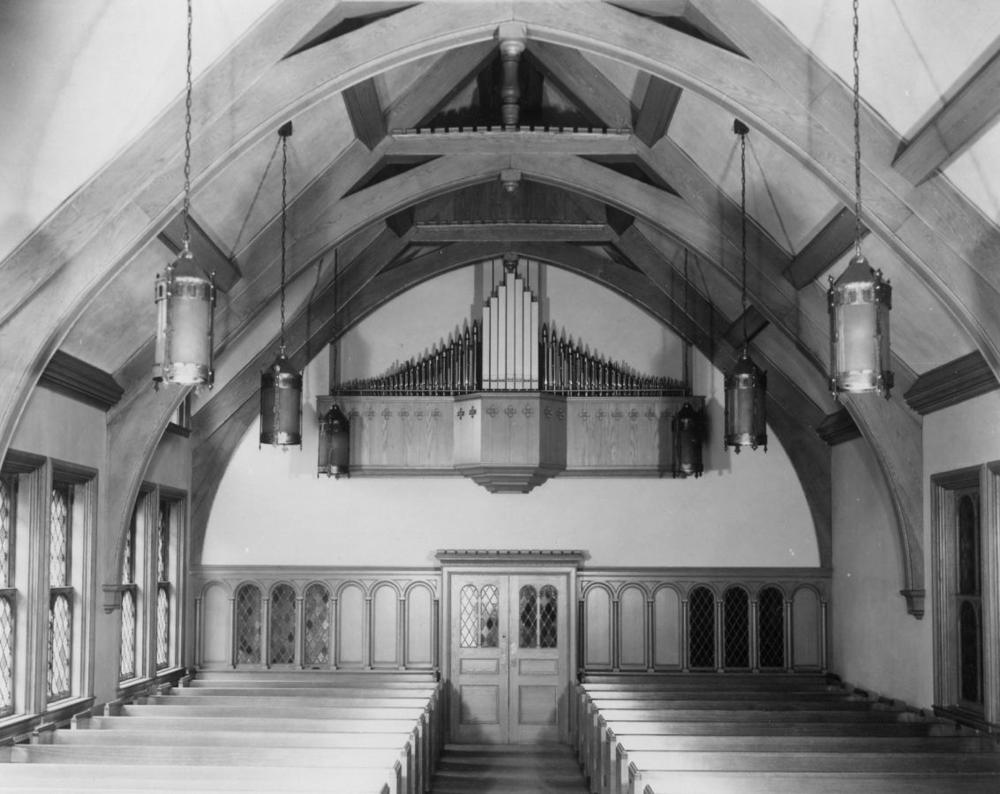
Möller, Op. 10264 (1966)

== Educational Foundings ==
Members of the Shadyside Presbyterian Church founded two East End education institutions. Chatham University began as the Pennsylvania Female College on February 23, 1869, founded by Dr. William Trimble Beatty, first pastor, Thomas and David Aiken, Joseph Dilworth, John Renshaw, Alfred Harrison, Alexander Chambers, William B. Negley, and William O'Hara Scully. The Shady Side Academy sprouted from the visions of Dr. John Morville Richmond, second pastor, and Dr. William R. Crabbe, first principal, in 1883. Camp Crestview (now Camp Crestfield) was established as a religious educational camp in 1946 from a bequeathment by Miss Margaret Pfeil by Dr. Hugh Thomson Kerr.

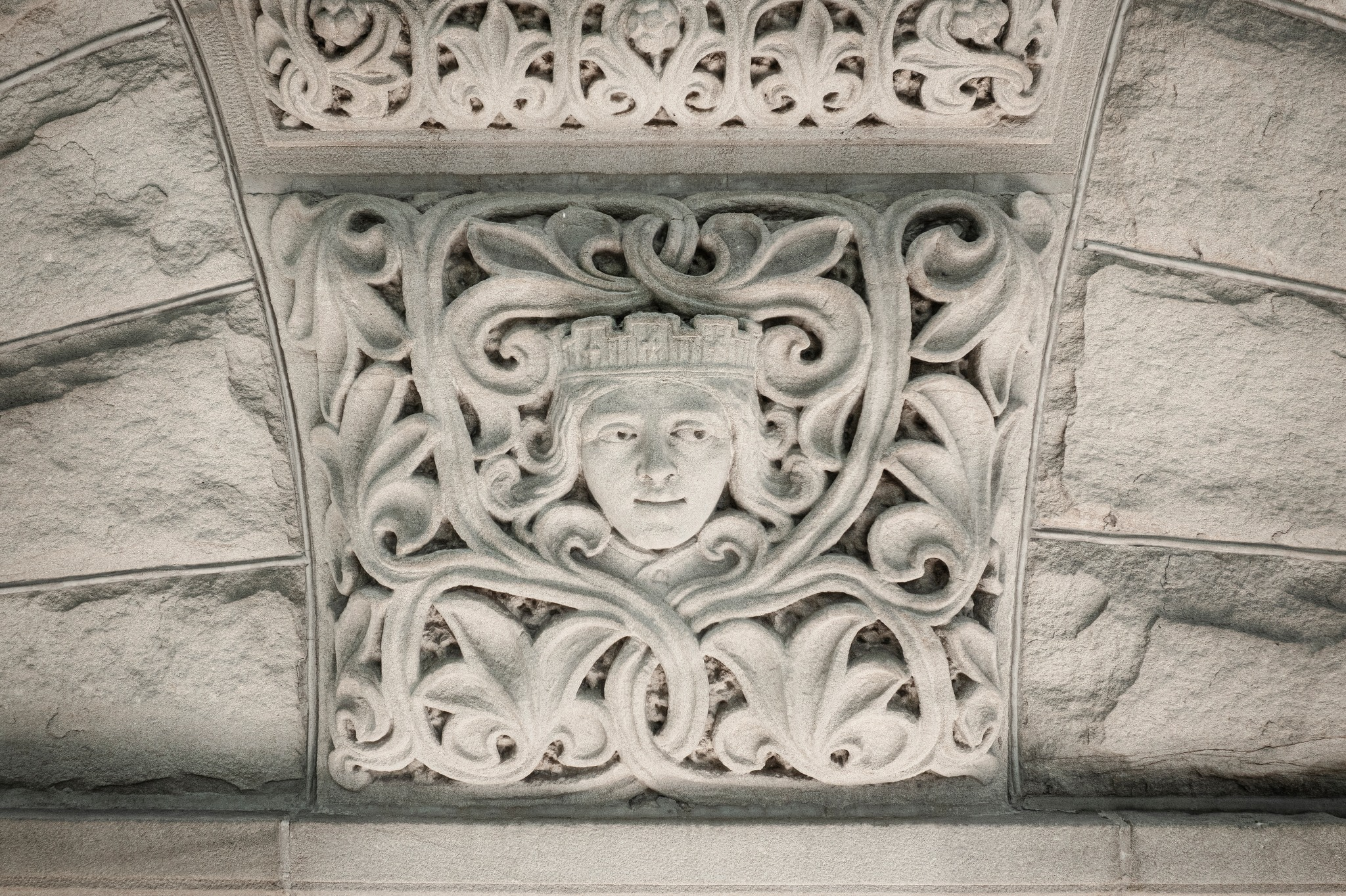
Queen of Sheba sculpture; north side of west doors. A prefiguring representation of the Church. With its counterpart on the opposite side, the pair are symbolic of Christ and the Church.

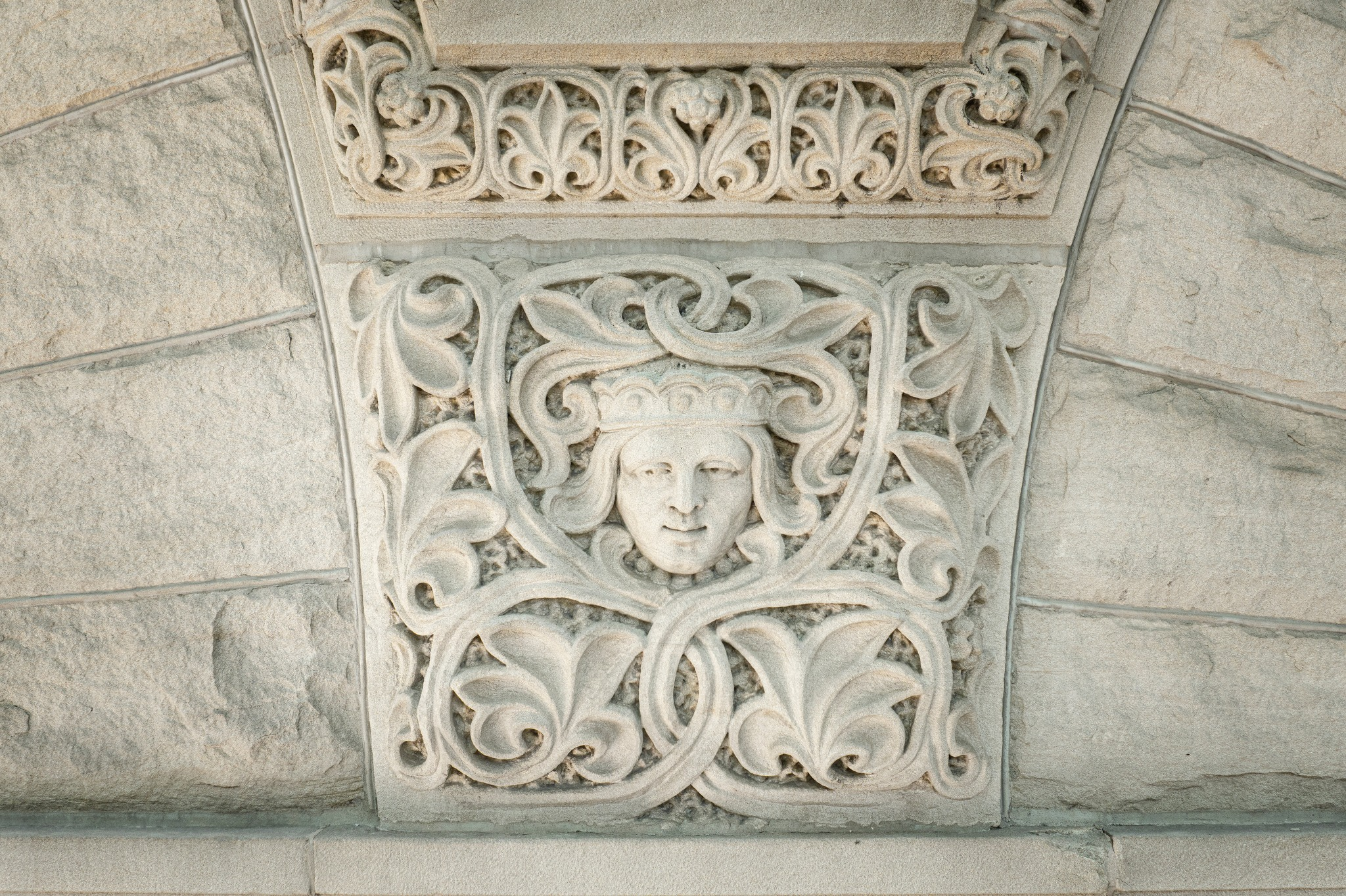
King Solomon sculpture; south side of west doors. A prefiguring representation of Christ. With its counterpart on the opposite side, the pair are symbolic of Christ and the Church.

== Local Missions Supported ==
Shadyside Presbyterian Church has served as benefactor or as a "mother church" to the following congregations and enterprises:

- Brentwood Presbyterian Church
- East End Cooperative Ministry
- Grace Memorial Presbyterian Church, Hill District
- Herron Avenue Presbyterian Church (non-extant)
- John Knox Presbyterian Church, Scott Twp.
- McKees Rocks Mission
- Oakland Presbyterian Church (non-extant)
- Penn Hills Presbyterian Church (now Mt. Hope)
- Pleasant Hills Community Presbyterian Church
- Providence Presbyterian Church, North Side (non-extant)
- Westminster Presbyterian Church, Upper St. Clair
- Shadyside-Walnut Street Project
- South Side Presbyterian Church and Community Center
- Trinity Presbyterian Church, East Liberty (non-extant)

== Notable Historical Figures ==
- Marcus W. Acheson, American judge
- Thomas Aiken, first architect of Shadyside Church
- Paul R. Anderson, President of Chatham College
- Edward V. Babcock, 45th Mayor of Pittsburgh
- John G. Bowman, Chancellor of the University of Pittsburgh
- William R. Crabbe, first principal of Shady Side Academy
- Stanton C. Crawford, Chancellor of the University of Pittsburgh
- Annie Dillard, American author
- Edward D. Eddy, President of Chatham College
- Rufus H. Fitzgerald, Chancellor of the University of Pittsburgh
- Howard Heinz, Heinz family of Pittsburgh
- Helen Marks, Dean of Chatham College
- William B. Negley, lawyer and Civil War major
- Samuel B. McCormick, Chancellor of the University of Pittsburgh
- Robert Pitcairn, American businessman
- William H. Rea, President of the Board of Public Education of Pittsburgh
- James H. Reed, American Judge
- Wallace H. Rowe, first president of Pittsburgh Steel Co.
- Richard Thornburgh, Governor of Pennsylvania
- Leslie Worthington, 8th president of U.S. Steel
