= Namak (film) =

- Movie poster
- Directed by: Kawal Sharma
- Written by: Rajeev Kaul; Ram Govind
- Produced by: Kawal Sharma
- Starring: Sanjay Dutt; Farah
- Cinematography: Dilip Dutta
- Music by: Anu Malik
- Production company: Kawal Films
- Release date: 20 December 1996
- Country: India
- Language: Hindi

Namak (lit. 'Salt') is a 1996 Hindi-language action film directed and produced by Kawal Sharma. The film stars Sanjay Dutt and Farah Naaz. The music of the film was composed by Anu Malik. The film was a remake of the 1975 super-hit Pakistani film Pehchan starring Shabnam and Nadeem.

== Cast ==
- Shammi Kapoor as Lala Kedarnath Sharma
- Sanjay Dutt as Gopal
- Farah as Dr. Anju
- Nirupa Roy as Shanti Sharma
- Prem Chopra as Rajinder "Jinder"
- Raza Murad as Rajeshwarnath
- Shakti Kapoor as Jagdish
- Gulshan Grover as Balwinder "Ballu" / "Gullu"
- Dinesh Hingoo as Munimji
- Jagdeep as Police Inspector
- Siddhant Salaria as Prabhat Sharma
- Sahila Chadha as Asha Sharma
- Amita Nangia as Sunita

== Soundtrack ==
The Music of the film was composed by Anu Malik and Released by Venus World Wide Entertainment.

Namak

Soundtrack album by Anu Malik
- Released: 1993
- Recorded: 1993
- Genre: Soundtrack
- Length: 47:03
- Label: Venus World Wide Entertainment
- Producer: Anu Malik

Anu Malik chronology
| Baazigar (1993) | Namak (1993) | Khuddar (1994) |

Track list
| No. | Title | Lyrics | Singer(s) | Length |
|---|---|---|---|---|
| 1. | "Om Jai Jagdish Hare" | Indeevar | Abhijeet, Sapna Mukherjee, Poonam Bhatia | 9:48 |
| 2. | "Mera Pyar Tere Jeevan Ke" | Indeevar (Original lyricist Masroor Anwar, Pakistani movie 'Pehchan 1975') | Abhijeet | 6:57 |
| 3. | "Kismat Roothi Duniya Chhooti" | Indeevar | Nitin Mukesh, Sadhana Sargam | 8:50 |
| 4. | "Chanda Bhi Nazar Aayega" | Hasrat Jaipuri | Nitin Mukesh, Sadhana Sargam, Shabbir Kumar | 9:15 |
| 5. | "Mera Pyar Tere Jeevan Ke (Female)" | Indeevar | Ranjana Joglekar | 7:03 |
| 6. | "Fatak Bam Bam" | Vishweshwar Sharma | Abhijeet | 5:10 |
| Total length: | | | | 47:03 |
