= Nadim al-Maghrebi =

Organization

Nadim al-Maghrebi (Arabic: نديم المغربي) was an Islamist militant organization formed in 2006 that sought to take by force the Spanish cities of Ceuta and Melilla, which have never been part of Morocco. It has issued a statement through the Internet asking Muslims to declare "war on Spanish infidel state and release the occupied cities of Ceuta and Melilla". This group is allegedly linked to Al Qaeda.
