= Awareness Foundation =

UK-based charity

- Founded: 1 January 2003; 23 years ago
- Founder: The Revd Nadim Nassar
- Type: Charity registered in England & Wales
- Purpose: Christian adult education, bridge-building between East and West, and interfaith projects
- Location: London, UK
- Origins: Constituted in the UK;
- Region served: UK, Middle East, North America, Hong Kong
- Executive Director: Nadim Nassar
- Royal Patron: The Countess of Wessex GCVO
- Revenue: GBP 189k in 2010/11; GBP 227,781 in 2017
- Employees: 6
- Volunteers: 6
- Website: awareness-foundation.com
- Formerly called: Trinity Foundation for Christianity and Culture

The Awareness Foundation, formerly the Trinity Foundation for Christianity and Culture, is a Christian charity that was established in England in 2003 for the purpose of peace-building between the Middle East and West.

== Overview ==
The Awareness Foundation is based in London, the UK, with supporters in North America, the Middle East, and Hong Kong.

The Foundation states that it works to build, "peace through empowering people in the Middle East and the West to use their faith as a means to bring reconciliation and understanding, driving out mistrust and hostility.".

Their Royal Patron is the Duchess of Edinburgh GCVO. Their Founding Patron was Rowan Williams, Archbishop of Canterbury. They now have a College of Patrons, including Williams, Charles Cadogan, 8th Earl Cadogan, Anba Angaelos, Christopher Cocksworth, Paul Kwong and Kevin McDonald. Leslie Griffiths is a former Patron.

== History ==
The Trinity Foundation for Christianity and Culture (TFCC) was launched in September 2003 by Rowan Williams, Archbishop of Canterbury, at a service at Holy Trinity, Sloane Street church. There were two co-founders; Bishop Michael Marshall was rector of Holy Trinity from 1997 to 2007, and Nadim Nassar was an assistant curate in the parish. The charity was later renamed the Awareness Foundation.

== Programmes ==
Work in the Middle East: Awareness Foundation Middle East is headed by Huda Nassar. It has two main missions: it "builds up understanding between the East and the West" and "strengthens and sustains Christians in the Middle East". Core projects include:

- Ambassadors for Peace: The Awareness Foundation trains young people in Syria and Iraq to become 'Ambassadors for Peace' in their community. So far, "over 700 young people have begun their journey to become Ambassadors for Peace, and much peace-building projects are now in development, including a center offering first aid training, a program to rehabilitate vulnerable street children, and an ecumenical dialogue project."
- Little Heroes: The Awareness Foundation states on its website, "In 2015, we decided to invite 200 (displaced children) to a special three-day Summer School to plant the seeds of love, trust, hope, and joy in their hearts so that they could overcome all they have faced and play an active role in their new homes, schools, and communities. "Our Little Heroes program has already helped more than 2,000 displaced children in Syria to give them a new hope and new energy to live their life without fear. This enables them to build new bridges of respect and understanding with children of other faiths that they meet in their new homes and schools."

Rest of the World:

- The PAX programme, is "a growing online collection of short yet challenging faith-based videos." The program's goals are described as "Through discussion of topics such as politics and faith, interfaith relationships, and how to combat extremism, PAX seeks to build peace by insisting upon compassion and respect.
- The Awareness Forum consists of special events such as dinners, conferences, roundtable exchanges, and lectures, focuses on the religious and cultural issues of the day.
- The Facing Faith program is described by the Foundation as "A community-based initiative to promote peace and understanding across barriers of faith & culture" by "bringing together community and faith leaders from different religions and cultures to discuss ideas."

== Awareness Sunday ==
The foundation held an Awareness Sunday event in September for several years up to 2020.

On Sunday 11 September 2011, a special public service of remembrance and reconciliation for Awareness Sunday took place at Westminster Abbey.

== Denominations ==
The Awareness Foundation is ecumenical, with board members from the Roman Catholic Church, the Church of England, the Episcopal Church in the US and the Middle East, the Greek Orthodox Church, Presbyterian, Methodist and Baptist Churches and several charismatic evangelical churches.

== Personnel ==
Michael Marshall was the first Executive Director of the Foundation. As of 2023, Nadim Nasser is the current Director. Nassar's first book, The Culture of God, was published by Hodder in 2018. He has been a guest blogger on the UK website of The Daily Telegraph, and both Nassar and Marshall have spoken around the world. Charles Longbottom was the Founding Chair of Trustees.
