= Nedim Durić =

Bosnian-Herzegovinian footballer

Personal information
- Full name: Nedim Durić
- Date of birth: July 24, 1993 (age 33)
- Place of birth: Cazin, Bosnia and Herzegovina
- Height: 1.78 m (5 ft 10 in)
- Position: Midfielder

Team information
- Current team: Edelweiss Linz
- Number: 7

Youth career
- FK Krajina Cazin U19

Senior career*
Years	Team	Apps	(Gls)
2011	Krajina Cazin		
2011	FC Luka Koper U19		
2012-2013	Gorica	5	(0)
2013–2014	Olimpic Sarajevo	3	(0)
2014	Jedinstvo Bihać		
2015-	Edelweiss Linz	121	(23)
- * Club domestic league appearances and goals as of 10 August 2013

Nedim Durić (born 24 July 1993 in Cazin) is a Bosnian-Herzegovinian footballer currently playing for Austrian 4th tier side Union Edelweiss Linz. He plays as a left midfielder.

== Club career ==
Durić started out playing for FK Krajina Cazin's U19 team before he was transferred into the senior team where he played for seven months until he was taken into the Slovenian team FC Luka Koper's U19 team. There he would spend an entire year polishing his skills before being transferred to another Slovenian team, namely ND Gorica. It was there that he made his debut in the Slovenian PrvaLiga as a substitute, during a match between his new team and ND Mura 05, on 24 November 2012. During the summer of 2013 he transferred to the Bosnian-Herzegovinian team FK Olimpic Sarajevo.
