= Nadim Nassar =

Syrian writer and founder of the Awareness Foundation

The Revd Nadim Nassar (born 1964) is a Syrian-British Anglican priest, who is the Executive Director and Founder of the Awareness Foundation. He established the Awareness Foundation in 2003 with Bishop Michael Marshall in response to the growing need to study the Christian faith in the context of the 21st century.

In 2018, Nassar's first book, "The Culture of God", was published by Hodder & Stoughton. The BBC's Edward Stourton said, 'So much of the reporting of the Middle East at the moment reflects war and human misery; it's inspiring to find, in this thoughtful and engaging book, a message of hope from what Fr Nadim calls "that region of the world that God chose to live in when he took human form"'

== Background ==
Nadim was born in 1964, and raised in Lattakia, Syria. He is the only Syrian priest in the Church of England. He studied at the Near East School of Theology between 1981 and 1988, graduating with a Bachelor of Theology (BTh) degree. He was ordained in the Church of England as a deacon in 2003 and as a priest in 2004. From 2003 to 2011, he was an honorary assistant curate at Holy Trinity, Sloane Street in the Diocese of London. He holds permission to officiate in the Diocese of Southwark, and preaches at churches across London.

He lectured in different universities in London, including the American Intercontinental University where he taught world religions, and London Guildhall University where he developed the 'Faith and Citizenship' seminar.

Nassar became the editor of the Arabic Hymnal for a year in Limassol, Cyprus then went to Lattakia, Syria to be the minister of the National Evangelical Church in Lattakia which is a member of the National Evangelical Synod in Syria and Lebanon. He stayed in Lattakia for two years before he left to Germany to continue his theological education.

== Lecturing, advising and speaking ==
Nadim Nassar is a member of Churches Together in Britain and Ireland's Inter Faith Theological Advisory Group, the All Party Parliamentary Group (APPG) on International Religious Freedom, and he advises the Foreign and Commonwealth Office. Nassar lectures, speaks and teaches in the Middle East, Europe and the US; he leads diocesan conferences in the US, UK and Hong Kong. He gives frequent public lectures for many organisations, including the Ismaili Centre, the Christian Muslim Forum and Near Neighbours, and has contributed articles to Britain's Guardian and Daily Telegraph newspapers.

He has been interviewed many times, including by the Tony Blair Faith Foundation.
